= Hongzhou school =

Chinese school of Chan Buddhism in the Tang period

The Hongzhou school (Chinese: 洪州宗; pinyin: Hóngzhōu Zōng) was a Chinese school of Chan of the Tang period (618–907), which started with Mazu Daoyi and included key figures Dazhu Huihai, Baizhang Huaihai, his student Huangbo Xiyun, Nanquan Puyuan and his student Zhaozhou Congshen.

The name Hongzhou refers to the Tang dynasty province that was located in the northern part of present-day Jiangxi province (the area around Nanchang). Mazu taught here during his last years and some of his disciples also taught in this region.

During the Song dynasty (960–1279), many texts were written which constructed encounter dialogues that included Hongzhou school masters as the main characters. These texts present them as iconoclastic and antinomian figures. However, modern scholars do not consider these later Song sources as reliable depictions of these historical figures.

== History ==
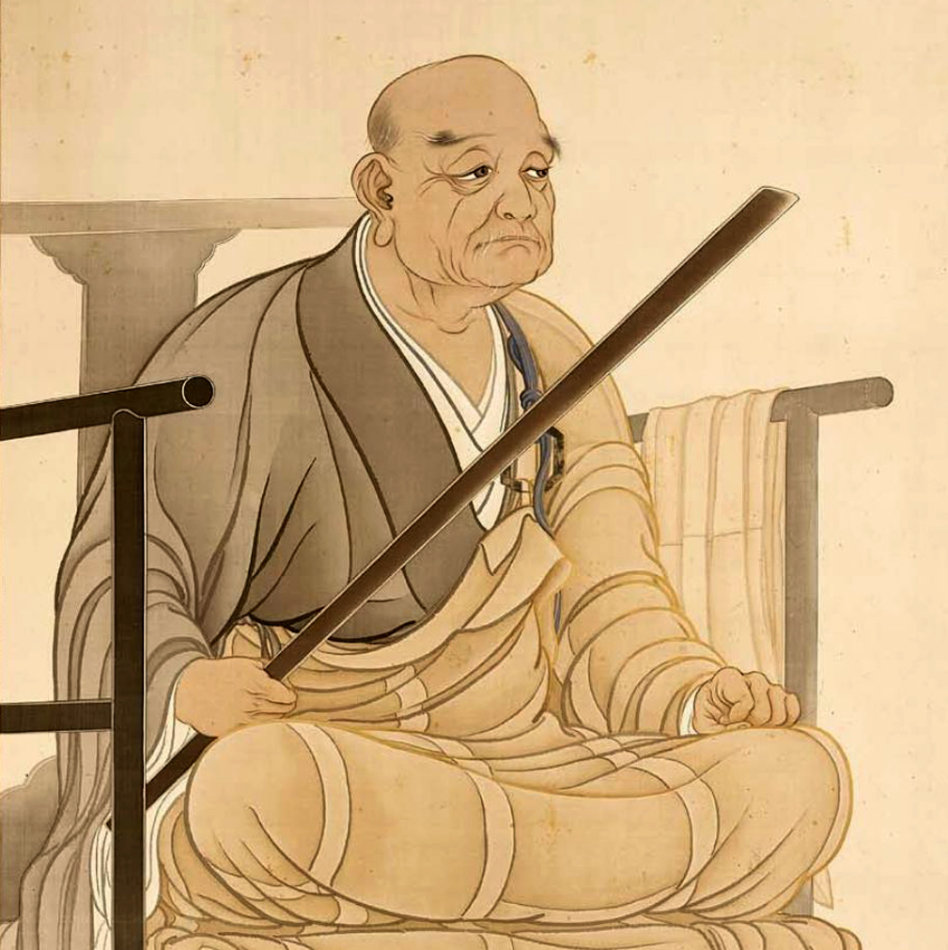
Mazu ("Master Ma") Daoyi

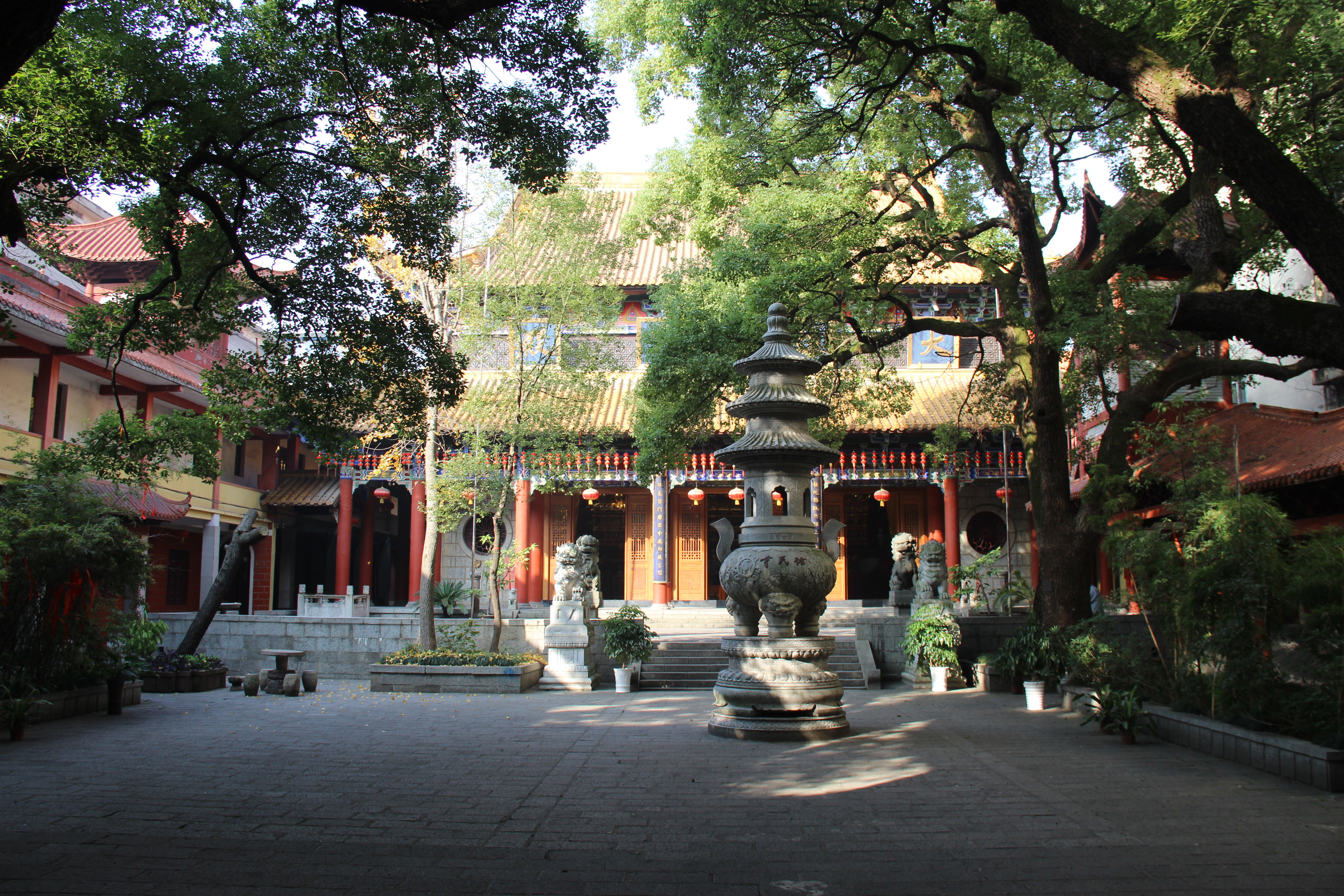
Youmin Temple in Nanchang, Mazu's main Hongzhou monastery during his later life (which at the time was known as Kaiyuan monastery).

During the life of the founder Mazu, the An Lu-shan Rebellion (755-763) led to a loss of control by the Tang dynasty, which changed the position of elite Chan Buddhism. Metropolitan Chan began to lose its status while other schools began to develop in outlying areas, led by various masters, many of whom traced themselves to Huineng.

=== Mazu Daoyi ===
Mazu Daoyi (709–788) was a monk from Sifang county, Sichuan. His teachers are said to have included Reverend Tang (684-734) of Zizhou, Reverend Jin (Korean: Kim, also known as Wuxiang, Korean: Musang), and Huairang. Traditionally, Mazu is depicted as a successor in the lineage of Huineng, through his teacher Nanyue Huairang. McRae argues that the connection between Huineng and Huairang is doubtful, being the product of later rewritings of Chan-history to place Mazu in the traditional lineages.

In the latter half of his life, Mazu moved to Hongzhou (present day north Jiangxi), where he began taking students. First he resided on Gonggong mountain, and then he settled in Nanchang's state-sponsored Kaiyuan monastery (today known as Youmin Temple) in Hongzhou (present day north Jiangxi). During his two decade period at this monastery, Mazu's fame spread and he attracted many disciples from throughout the empire.

According to Poceski, "Mazu had the largest number of close disciples (rushi dizi 入室弟子, literally, “disciples who entered the room”) among Chan teachers from the Tang period." Some students of Mazu include: Nanquan, Fenzhou Wuye (761–823), Guizong Zhichang (dates unknown), Xingshan Weikuan (755–817), Zhangjing Huaihui (756–815), Danxia Tianran (739–824), Dongsi Ruhui (744–823), Tianhuang Daowu (748–807), and Furong Taiyu (747–826).

Poceski also notes that Mazu's disciples "come across as monks at home in their dealings with powerful officials. They appear conversant with Buddhist texts, doctrines, and practices, and proficient at preaching to monks and literati alike."

Six Patriarchs
Huineng (638-713) (Hui-neng, Jpn. Enō)
Nanyue Huairang (677-744) (Nan-yüeh Huai-jang, Jpn. Nangaku Ejō))
Mazu Daoyi (709-788) (Ma-tsu Tao-i, Jpn. Baso Dōitsu)
Nanquan Puyuan (748-835) (Nan-ch'üan p'u-yüan, Jpn. Nansen Fugan)	Baizhang Huaihai (720-814) (Pai-chang Huai-hai, Jpn. Hyakujō Ekai)
Zhaozhou Congshen (778--879) (Chao-chou Ts'ung-shen, Jpn. Jōshū Jūshin)	Huangbo Xiyun (d.850) (Huang-po Hsi-yüan, Jpn. Ōbaku Kiun)	Guishan Lingyou (771-853) (Kuei-shan Ling-yu, Jpn. Isan Reiyū)
	Linji Yixuan (d.866) (Lin-chi I-hsüan, Jpn. Rinzai Gigen)	Guiyang school
	Linji school

=== Students of Mazu ===
==== Xitang Zhizang ====
After Mazu's death in 788, Xitang Zhizang became the leader of Kaiyuan monastery. Despite his leading role, little information on him is found in Chan sources and there is no record of his sayings. None of his disciples were influential and perhaps this is why he was neglected in later sources. After the Tang, Baizhang and Nanquan supplanted Xitang as the leaders of the second generation of the school.

==== Baizhang Huaihai ====
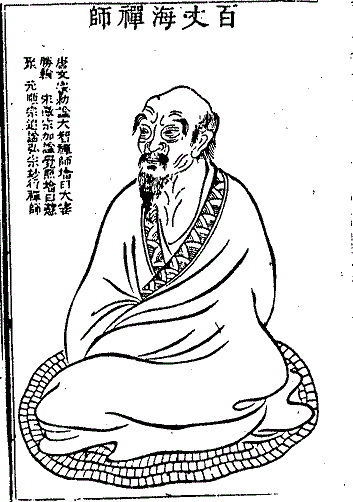
Baizhang

Baizhang Huaihai (720–814) was a dharma heir of Mazu and a member of the aristocratic Wang clan of Taiyuan. Baizhang later came to be seen as Mazu's most important disciple, though early on, his name did not even appear in Mazu's stele inscription as part of Mazu's ten main disciples. Baizhang's main center was at the remote Baizhang mountain southwest of Shimen where he taught students, including Guishan Lingyou (771–853) and Huangbo, for two decades.

Later tradition attributes to Bhaizang the creation of a unique kind of Chan monasticism and the authorship of an early set of rules for Chan monastics, the Pure Rules of Baizhang (Chinese: 百丈清規; pinyin: Bǎizhàng qīngguī; Wade–Giles: Pai-chang ch'ing-kuei), but there is no historical evidence for this. Indeed, according to Poceski "his traditional image as a patron saint of “Chan monasticism” is not in any meaningful way related to him as a historical person. Baizhang did not institute a novel system of Chan monastic rules that was institutionally disengaged from the mainstream tradition of Tang monasticism."

Later Song dynasty texts also attempt to make Baizhang the main "orthodox" recipient of Mazu's lineage. This is a later genealogical construct by Song authors, Mazu did not have one single "orthodox" disciple, but many different disciples who spread his teachings throughout China.

==== Other students of Mazu ====
Mazu's many students spread his teachings throughout China. As Poceski writes, the Hongzhou school heavily relied on imperial and aristocratic patronage which allowed it to quickly emerge as a major Chan tradition in the ninth century.

A major center of the Hongzhou tradition was at Mount Lu, where the leading disciple Guizong Zhichang (dates unknown) and Fazang (dates unknown) built the first Chan communities on the mountain, like Guizong temple, which was visited by the poet Li Bo. Other disciples who formed communities of their own in Jiangxi include Shigong Huizang (dates unknown), Nanyuan Daoming (dates unknown), and Yangqi Zhenshu (d. 820).

Huaihui and Weikuan are known for having established the Hongzhou school in the imperial capital of Chang'an. Weikuan was even invited by Emperor Xianzong to preach at the imperial court in 809 and he remained in the capital's Xingshan monastery until the end of his life, becoming a central figure of the imperial capital's religious life. He was also the teacher of the poet Bo Juyi.

Regarding the old capital of Luoyang, the best known disciple of Mazu who taught here was Foguang Ruman (752–842?). He was also a teacher of the poet Bo Juyi.

Outside of Jiangxi, Yaoshan, Ruhui, Tanzang (758–827), Deng Yinfeng (dates unknown), and Zhaoti Huilang (738–820) all formed communities in Hunan, while Yanguan, Dazhu Huihai, and Damei Fachang formed communities in Zhejiang. Regarding the northern provinces, Shaanxi and Shanxi received disciples such as Wuye, Zhixian, and Magu Baoche (dates unknown).

=== Relationship with Oxhead-school ===
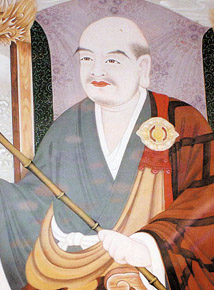
Doui, a student of Zhizang and Baizhang who established the Gaji san school (迦智山) at Borimsa.

There are links between Mazu's school and the Oxhead school. Some of Mazu's students were known to have come from the Oxhead school and others were sent to study at Oxhead monasteries by Mazu himself. An inscription for Dayi, one of Mazu's students, condemns sectarianism and according to Poceski "rejects the sharp distinctions between the Northern and Southern schools propounded by Shenhui and his followers and instead argues for a rapprochement between the two." Poceski also notes that "the inscription implies that Mazu's disciples adopted a tolerant attitude toward other Chan schools/lineages and eschewed the pursuit of narrow sectarian agendas (or at least were more subtle about it)."

=== Growth to dominance ===
During the mid-Tang, most other major Chan schools (the Northern school, the Oxhead school, Shenhui's Southern school and the Baotang) all died out, being unable to attract enough students and support. This allowed Mazu's school to become the dominant Chan tradition in China. The only other school which survived this period was Shitou's school, though it remained a marginal one.

The Hongzhou school superseded the older Chan schools and established themselves as their official successor, the inclusive defender of Tang Chan orthodoxy which avoided the antinomianism of Baotang and the sectarianism of Shenhui's Southern school. While individual teachers like Shitou Xiqian and Guifeng Zongmi did present alternative traditions, they never rivaled the Hongzhou tradition, which remained the normative form of Chan for the rest of the Tang and beyond.

Mazu's students were also influential during the spread of Chan to Korea during the pivotal period of the first half of the ninth century. During this period, almost all Korean Seon monks who participated in the transmission of Chan to Korea were students of Mazu's disciples. These figures founded seven out of the Korean “nine mountain schools of Sŏn” (kusan sŏnmun).

=== Next generations and replacement by regional traditions ===
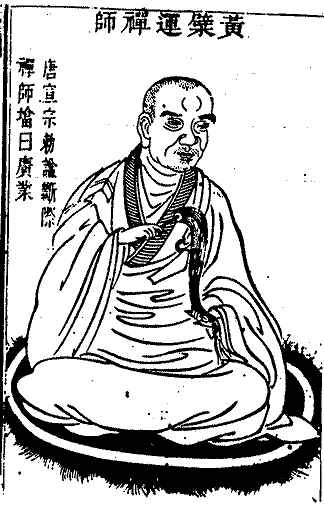
Huangbo Xiyun

A key figure of the third generation is Huangbo Xiyun (died 850), who was a dharma heir of Baizhang Huaihai. He started his monastic career at Mount Huangbo. In 842 he took up residence at Lung-hsing Monastery at the invitation of Pei Xiu (787 or 797–860), who was also a lay-student of Guifeng Zongmi of Shenhui's Heze school. Huangbo's student, Linji Yìxuán (died 866 CE), was later seen as the founder of his own school, the Linji school, based in Hebei's Linji temple, which remains a tradition today after having become the dominant form of Chan during the Song dynasty.

As Poceski writes,

With the passage of time, some of the luster of Mazu's religious personality was transferred to Linji, and the image of the Hongzhou school was altered in ways that reflected the ideological stances of subsequent Chan/Zen traditions. This process is reflected in later mythologized constructions of the Hongzhou school's teachings and character. The mystique ascribed to Mazu and his disciples was accompanied with assorted obscurations of the Hongzhou school's history, doctrines, practices, and institutions.

By the latter Tang dynasty, the Hongzhou school's was supplanted by various distinct regional traditions (the "five houses") that arose during the instability of the late Tang and the Five Dynasties eras. The first of these was the Guiyang school of Guishan and his disciple Yangshan, but this tradition did not survive the fall of the Tang.

== Teachings ==
=== Background ===
According to Jinhua Jia, "the doctrinal foundation of the Hongzhou school was mainly a mixture of the tathagata-garbha thought and prajñaparamita theory, with a salient emphasis on the kataphasis of the former."

Poceski also highlights the importance of buddha-nature for the Hongzhou school, though he also writes that "overall there is a disposition to avoid imputing explicit ontological status to the Buddha-nature...this is accompanied by a Madhyamaka-like stress on nonattachment and elimination of one-sided views—especially evident in Baizhang's record—that are based on the notion that ultimate reality cannot be predicated."

He also argues that the Hongzhou school's doctrinal approach was an eclectic approach that drew on diverse sources, including Madhyamaka, Yogacara, the Huayan school's philosophy as well as Daoist works.

Furthermore, their use of sources was "accompanied by an aversion to dogmatic assertions of indelible truths and an awareness of the provisional nature of conceptual constructs." Thus, while the Hongzhou school made use of various teachings, they were not to be seen as a fixed theory, since ultimate truth is indescribable and beyond words.

Mazu's citation of various sutras indicate that his teaching drew from Mahayana sources like the Laṅkāvatāra sutra's mind-only teaching (yogacara - cittamatra). Other teachings of Mazu and Baizhang also quote or paraphrase other Mahayana sutras, like the Vimalakirti sutra and Prajñāpāramitā scriptures. According to Poceski, "rather than repudiating the scriptures or rejecting their authority, the records of Mazu and his disciples are full of quotations and allusions to a range of canonical texts." Poceski also notes that in Baizhang's record one can find numerous scriptural citations, including "obscure references and the use of a technical vocabulary that point to a mastery of canonical texts and doctrines." However, even while they retained the use of scripture and demonstrated a mastery of the canon, the Hongzhou sources also demonstrate that these Chan teachers had the ability to express the insights of Mahayana in a new way.

Regarding the reading of scriptures and studying doctrines, Baizhang says:

In reading scriptures and studying the doctrines, you should turn all words right around and apply them to yourself. But all verbal teachings only point to the inherent nature of the present mirror awareness—as long as this is not affected by any existent or nonexistent objects at all, it is your guide; it can shine through all various existent and nonexistent realms. This is adamantine wisdom, where you have your share of freedom and independence. If you cannot understand in this way, then even if you could recite the whole canon and all its branches of knowledge, it would only make you conceited, and conversely shows contempt for Buddha—it is not true practice. Just detach from all sound and form, and do not dwell in detachment, and do not dwell in intellectual understanding—this is practice. As for reading scriptures and studying the doctrines, according to worldly convention it is a good thing, but if assessed from the standpoint of one who is aware of the inner truth, this (reading and study) chokes people up. Even people of the tenth stage cannot escape completely, and flow into the river of birth and death.

=== Monasticism ===
The Hongzhou school was a monastic tradition and as such, Buddhist monasticism, with its Vinaya disciplinary code and emphasis on renunciation and simple living, is an assumed background to Hongzhou school sources. The Guishan jingce (Guishan's Admonitions) provides an overview of the Hongzhou school's teachings on monastic life and ethics, which generally follow traditional Chinese models. The Hongzhou school did have lay followers, however. Layman Pang was one of Mazu's students. Similarly, the scholar-official and poet Bai Juyi was a follower of the Hongzhou master Xingshan Weikuan 興善惟寬 (755–817). The literati Pei Xiu was also a disciple of Huangbo Xiyun and compiled a record of his teachings.

=== Non-attachment and ultimate reality ===
According to Poceski, at the core of the teaching of Hongzhou teachers like Mazu, Dazhu, Baizhang, Nanquan, and Huangbo is the cultivation of non-attachment, "an ascent into increasingly rarefied states of detachment and transcendence, in which the vestiges of dualistic thought are eliminated. This implies not clinging to any doctrine, practice, or experience, including the notions of detachment and nonduality. The perfection of a liberated state of mind that is free from attachment and ignorance, explains Baizhang, is predicated on the realization of the twofold emptiness of person and things."

Awakening is the sudden letting go of all deluded thoughts, it is a mind that does not abide or cling to anything. Dazhu Huihai defines the "non-abiding mind" (wuzhu xin) as follows:

Not abiding anywhere [means that] one does not abide in good and evil, existence and nothingness, inside, outside, or in-between. Not abiding in emptiness and not abiding in non-emptiness, not abiding in concentration and not abiding in the absence of concentration, that is not abiding anywhere. Only this not abiding anywhere is the [true] abode. When one attains this, it is called the non-abiding mind. The non-abiding mind is the Buddha mind.

Similarly, Huangbo writes that "if students of the Way wish to attain Buddhahood, they need not study all Buddhadharmas. They only need to study “non-seeking” and “non-attachment” ... Just transcend all afflictions, and then there is no Dharma that can be obtained."

The Hongzhou school, like many Mahayana traditions, held that all things are permeated and encompassed by an ultimate reality which complete and perfect, and is variously termed the “One Mind”, "original mind", "truth" or “Suchness”.

A key element of the Hongzhou's school's practice instructions was to let go of conceptual thoughts, which are always dualistic. The state which has let go of all views, concerns, and thoughts is called no-mind (wuxin) and was promoted by masters like Huangbo. Mazu states:

The self-nature is originally complete. If only either good or evil things do not hinder one, then that is a person who cultivates the Way. Grasping good and rejecting evil, contemplating emptiness and entering samādhi, all of these belong to activity. If one seeks outside, one goes away from it. Just put an end to all mental conceptions in the three realms. If there is not a single thought, then one eliminates the root of birth and death, and obtains the unexcelled treasury of the Dharma king.

=== Skillful means ===
Because of the ultimate reality and the everyday world are non-dual, awakening is always available to all, at all times, through letting go. Generally though, to discover this ultimate reality, we need specific spiritual practices (i.e. skillful means, Ch: fang-bian) tailored to the individual. According to Poceski, these methods for liberation need to be "flexible, contextual, and nuanced" and they should not be turned into sources of attachment. Indeed, every teaching or practice is a skillful means, and is only useful if it helps certain people to awakening. No teaching should be seen as a dogmatic assertion.

This view led to what Poceski terms "the determined refusal on the part of Mazu and his disciples to commit to a narrow doctrinal perspective." Mazu's school generally understood ultimate reality to be “inconceivable” (buke siyi), as "transcending conceptual constructs and verbal expressions." They thus stressed the need to avoid the reification of and attachment to religious texts, doctrines, practices, and experiences. Becoming attached to these turned them into obstacles to awakening instead of useful methods. Because of this, authors like Baizhang held that the truth of a doctrine was dependent on its power to lead to spiritual awakening.

Thus, according to Baizhang "true words cure sickness. If the cure manages to bring about healing, then all are true words. [On the other hand,] if they cannot effectively cure sickness, all are false words. True words are false words, insofar as they give rise to views. False words are true words, insofar as they cut off the delusions of sentient beings." Ultimately, figures like Dazhu held that eventually one needs to abandon all words and teachings: "words are used to reveal the [ultimate] meaning, but when the meaning is realized, words are discarded."

=== "This Mind is Buddha" ===
Two related teachings which appear frequently in the works of Mazu and his disciples are the statements "This Mind is Buddha" (即心是佛, jixin shi fo) and "Ordinary Mind is the Way" (平常心是道, ping chang xin shi dao). These ideas are based on teachings found in the Avatamsaka sutra, as well as on the doctrine of the non-duality of samsara and nirvana and Chinese Buddhist ideas, like the doctrine of the "true mind" (zhenxin) and the teachings of the Awakening of Faith. The Avatamsaka states: "As mind is, so is the Buddha; as the Buddha is, so are living beings. One should know that the Buddha's and mind's Essential nature is boundless."

The basic idea of the mind being buddha is that there is a true buddha mind or "a substratum of pure awareness" (as Poceski puts it) within all sentient beings, but this is obscured by passing defilements. As Mazu states (echoing the Awakening of Faith):

The mind can be spoken of [in terms of its two aspects]: birth and death, and suchness. The mind as suchness is like a clear mirror, which can reflect images. The mirror symbolizes the mind; the images symbolize phenomena (dharmas). If the mind attaches to phenomena, then it gets involved in external causes and conditions, which is the meaning of birth and death. If the mind does not attach to phenomena, that is the meaning of suchness.

One source text of Mazu's teaching states:

All of you should believe that your mind is Buddha, that this mind is identical with Buddha. The Great Master Bodhidharma came from India to China and transmitted the One Mind [Ch: 一心思想, yixinshixiang] teaching of Mahāyāna so that it can lead you all to awakening. Fearing that you will be too confused and will not believe that this One Mind is inherent in all of you, he used the Laṅkāvatāra Scripture to seal the sentient beings' mind-ground. Therefore, in the Laṅkāvatāra Scripture, the Buddha stated that mind is the essential teaching, and the gate of non-being is the Dharma-gate.

Mazu and his students were careful to indicate that this teaching should not be reified as a kind of self (atman) or an unchanging essence. In other passages, Mazu states that he teaches mind is Buddha to "stop the crying of children" and that later he teaches them "it is neither mind nor Buddha" (feixin feifo) and that "it is not a thing" (bushi wu). Poceski notes that in this context the "mind is Buddha" teaching serves as an introductory teaching meant to inspire confidence, which later might even be negated as one progresses in one's training. Likewise, Baizhang argues that all such teaching statements are provisional and must ultimately be given up. What's more, Baizhang says, "If you say the immediate mirror awareness is correct, or that there is something else beyond the mirror awareness, this is all delusion" and, "Do not remain in your immediate mirror awareness, but do not seek enlightenment elsewhere."

=== "Ordinary Mind is the Way" ===
==== Classical statements ====
In a sermon, Mazu states:

If you want to know the Way directly, then ordinary mind is the Way (平常心是道, ping chang xin shi dao). (Note: The etymology is as follows: 平, ping, "flat, level, equal, to tie (make the same score), to draw (score), calm, peaceful" (Note: writtenchinese.com, 平); 常, chang, "always, ever, often, frequently, common, general, constant" (Note: writtenchinese.com, 常); 平常, "ordinary, common, usually, ordinarily" (Note: writtenchinese.com, 平常); 心 xin, "heart," "mind," "heart-mind"; 平常心, usually translated as "ordinary mind"; but also as "undisturbed mind," (Note: Paradise Bound, Undisturbed mind is the way) "normal, peaceful, undisturbed mind"; 是, shi, "is"; 道, dao, "Tao," "the way" (Note: writtenchinese.com, 道)) What is an ordinary mind? It means no intentional creation and action, no right or wrong, no grasping or rejecting, no terminable or permanent, no profane or holy. The sutra says, “Neither the practice of ordinary men, nor the practice of sages—that is the practice of the Bodhisattva.” Now all these are just the Way: walking, abiding, sitting, lying, responding to situations, and dealing with things. (Note: Guifeng Zongmi presented the view of the Hongzhou school as follows: "The arising of mental activity, the movement of thought, snapping the fingers, or moving the eyes, all actions and activities are the functioning of the entire essence of the Buddha-nature. Since there is no other kind of functioning, greed, anger, and folly, the performance of good and bad actions and the experiencing of their pleasurable and painful consequences are all, in their entirety, Buddha-nature.")

The phrase also appears in the Chao-chou Ch'an-shih Yu-Lu in which Zhaozhou Congshen (J. Jōshū Jūshin) (778–897) asks his teacher Nanquan Puyuan (J: Nansen Fugan) (748–835) "What is the Way (Tao)?", to which Nanquan responds "Ordinary mind is the way." The full exchange is as follows:

The master asked Nan-ch'uan (Nansen), "What is the Way?"
Nan-ch'uan said, "Ordinary mind is the Way."
The master said, "Then may I direct myself towards it or not?"
Nan-ch'uan said, "To seek [it] is to deviate [from it]."
The master said, "If I do not seek, how can I know about the Way?"
Nan-chu'an said, "The Way does not belong to knowing or not knowing. To know is to have a concept; to not know is to be ignorant. If you truly realize the Way of no doubt, it is just like the sky: wide open vast emptiness. How can you say 'yes' or 'no' to it?"
At these words the master had sudden enlightenment. His mind became like the clear moon. (Note: Compare with Sengzhao: "Now, not knowing arises in relation to knowing; neither not knowing nor knowing can be asserted [of the sagely mind]. Because there is in it no knowing, I speak of it as 'not being'; because there is in it no not knowing, I call it 'not nonbeing.'")

==== Complete empirical human mind of purity and defilement ====
Modern scholars interpret ordinary mind in various ways. According to Jinhua Jia, "Mazu’s 'ordinary mind' represents the complete, empirical human mind of good and evil, purity and defilement, enlightenment and ignorance of ordinary people." According to this interpretation, Mazu identified the absolute Buddha-nature with the ordinary human mind of ignorance and delusion, and held that buddha-nature manifests in function. Jia refers to the anecdote of Fenzhou Wuye's first visit to Mazu when he said he did not understand the meaning of "this mind is the Buddha," to which Mazu responded: "This very mind that doesn't understand is it, without any other thing."

According to Jia, while Mazu was influenced by the Huayan doctrine of nature-origination, which holds that all phenomena are manifestations of buddha-nature, his stance that buddha-nature manifests in function was nonetheless different:

In the Huayan theory, the pure Buddha-nature remains forever untainted, even though it gives rise to defiled phenomena and originates the realization of all sentient beings’ enlightenment. In Mazu’s doctrine, the spontaneous, ordinary state of human mind and life, which is a mix of purity and defilement, is identical with Buddha-nature.

The Hongzhou school was criticized for their apparent equation of ordinary mind and Buddha-nature. Zongmi stated that "they fail to distinguish between ignorance and enlightenment, the inverted and the upright," arguing that Hongzhou Chan's mistake was rooted in its teaching that greed, hatred and delusion, good and evil, happiness or suffering are all Buddha-nature. Nanyang Huizhong stated that “the south[ern doctrine] wrongly taught deluded mind as true mind, taking thief as son, and regarding mundane wisdom as Buddha wisdom.”

==== Detached nondual awareness ====
Mario Poceski takes a different view and associates "ordinary mind" with the "no-mind" found in earlier Chan sources like the Wuxin lun (Treatise on No-mind), the Platform Scripture, and the Lidai fabao ji (Record of the Dharma-Jewel through the Ages). According to Poceski, the aforementioned criticisms of Mazu's "ordinary mind" do not hold, since Mazu and his students did not refer to the "everyday mind of ordinary people," clearly stating that "ordinary mind" is without defilements and unwholesome mental states. Poceski defines 'ordinary mind' as "the nondual mind, which is divested of impurities and transcends all views and attachments." According to Poceski, this "detached state of nondual awareness" requires religious training and practice which "involves a constant effort to abstain from giving rise to discriminating thoughts, which bifurcate reality into dualistic opposites and obscure the essential nature of the 'ordinary mind.'” Poceski says these teachings are directed at monks who are engaged in daily contemplative practices:

In that context, they serve as instruction about the cultivation of a holistic state of awareness, in which the mind abandons all defilements and is unattached to dualistic concepts such as worldliness and holiness, permanence and impermanence. One of Mazu's key points is that such a mental state can be perfected within the context of everyday life. Since all things and events partake of the character of reality, they provide avenues for the cultivation of detachment and transcendence. The passage can also be read as a caution against quietist withdrawal from the world and the cultivation of refined states of meditative absorption, symbolized by the sages who follow the Hīnayāna path.

==== Naturally functioning mind ====
John McRae critiques Poceski's position, calling Poceski's interpretation of ordinary mind as an undefiled mind "improbable and not well supported by evidence." McRae says, "I am not at all convinced by Poceski’s interpretation of 'ordinary mind' (pingchang xin 平常心) as pure mind, devoid of discrimination and illusions," which "is strikingly different from the term’s usual understanding." He says the connection between Poceski's interpretation and the passages he cites in support of it is tenuous, and that his "lack of sufficient evidentiary and interpretive support is unfortunate." McRae further points out that Poceski's exclusive focus on connections with earlier Chan notions like no-mind and no-thought potentially creates difficulties for understanding connections between Hongzhou school doctrine and later developments in Chan.

McRae presents an alternative viewpoint to both Jia and Poceski, although he does say that "in some ways Jia's treatment of the Mazu maxim 'ordinary mind is the way' is better than Poceski's." McRae explains that according to the view of the Japanese scholar Ogawa Takashi, "ordinary mind" is neither a capacious container of enlightened and unenlightened mentalities (as Jia understands it) nor a pure mind divorced from all defilements (as Poceski understands it). Instead, ordinary mind is "the fundamental capability of cognition, the bare working of the human mind" which is functioning all the time, perfectly and automatically, as "primordial cognitive capacity." (Note: Compare with Linji Yixuan's "true man of no rank," and Bankei's "Unborn Buddha Mind.")

=== "Original purity" and "No cultivation" ===
Mazu taught that

“Self-nature is originally perfectly complete. If only one is not hindered by either good or evil things, he is called a man who cultivates the Way. Grasping good and rejecting evil, contemplating emptiness and entering concentration—all these belong to intentional action. If one seeks further outside, he strays farther away.”

Mazu also stated that the Buddha-nature or the Original Mind is already pure, without the need for cultivation and hence he stated that “the Way needs no cultivation”. This was because according to Mazu:

This mind originally existed and exists at present, without depending on intentional creation and action; it was originally pure and is pure at present, without waiting for cleaning and wiping. Self-nature attains nirvana; self-nature is pure; self-nature is liberation; and self nature departs [from delusions].

This view was also criticized by Zongmi because he believed it “betrayed the gate of gradual cultivation.”

For Mazu, Buddha nature was actualized in everyday human life and its actions. As noted by Jinhua Jia "the ultimate realm of enlightenment manifests itself everywhere in human life, and Buddha-nature functions in every aspect of daily experiences". Thus, Mazu argued:

Since limitless kalpas, all sentient beings have never left the samadhi of dharma-nature, and they have always abided in the samadhi of dharma-nature. Wearing clothes, eating food, talking and responding, making use of the six senses—all these activities are dharma nature. If you now understand this reality, you will truly not create any karma. Following your destiny, passing your life, with one cloak or one robe, wherever sitting or standing, it is always with you.

=== View on practice ===
While many traditional sources have seen the Hongzhou school as completely subitist, and as rejecting all gradual practice (a critique leveled by Zongmi), Poceski writes that "a closer look at the relevant textual sources reveals that terms and ideas associated with subitism are not nearly as prominent within the Hongzhou school's teachings as later generations of Chan teachers, writers, and scholars have presupposed." The term 'sudden awakening' only appears once in the records of Mazu, and refers to the experience of a person with superior capacity. Likewise, it only appears once in Baizhang's record, and not in a saying attributed to him.

Poceski's position is that while certain critiques of gradual methods are found, they generally center on critiques of mechanical cultivation as well as reification of and attachment to specific methods or skillful means. They do not outright reject spiritual cultivation per se.

On the other hand, according to Jia, the Hongzhou view is that:

The spontaneous state of human mind is the Way or the state of enlightenment. Chan practice involves nothing more than keeping the mind in a complete state and releasing it from all artificially imposed restraints, free to act naturally and spontaneously. As a result, the various forms of religious practice of early Chan, such as nianfo, seated meditation, “pacifying the mind” (anxin), “maintaining the mind” (shouxin), “cultivating the mind” (xiuxin), and “contemplating the mind” (guanxin), were no longer advocated.

According to Faure, the absence of such practices as the "one-practice samādhi" (yixing sanmei) in the Hongzhou school indicates an "epistemological split" between early and classical Chan. Also, Jinhua Jia observes that according to two Korean stele inscriptions, the Silla monk Toūi (d. 825) brought back to Korea the Hongzhou doctrines of “following one’s destiny freely and acting nothing” and “no-cultivation and no-certification,” and that these were strongly rejected by the earlier Korean scholastic schools.

Jia also points out how Mazu's attitude toward the doctrine of original enlightenment differs from that of the Awakening of Faith in which original enlightenment (benjue) is situated among two other terms, "non-enlightenment" (bujue) and "actualized enlightenment" (shijue), and the three together form a cycle of religious practice. She says Mazu simplifies this cycle by emphasizing only original enlightenment. Thus, for Mazu, one can discover that which "originally existed and exists at present" without any need for religious practice. However, Jia admits that while Mazu and his disciples theoretically rejected religious practice and cultivation, "Liturgically and practically, it is doubtful that the daily practices of traditional monastic life did not continue in Chan communities."

For Mazu, the Way is beyond both cultivating and not cultivating. He says:

“The Way does not belong to cultivation. If you speak of any attainment through cultivation, whatever is accomplished through cultivation will again decay, just the same as the Śrāvaka (Hearer). If you speak of no cultivation, then you will be the same as an ordinary man.” (Note: Compare with the teaching of Shenhui who taught going beyond both regulating and not regulating the mind, as well as both intentionalizing and not intentionalizing (since to intentionalize was to be fettered, while to not intentionalize made one "no different than a deaf fool."))

Likewise, the Dunwu rudao yaomen lun, attributed to Mazu's immediate disciple Dazhu Huihai, taught going beyond both deeds and no deeds. (Note: Compare with the following, attributed to Baozhi: "Action and inaction—abolishing both is peace forever" According to Jinhua Jia, although a number of Chan teachings, including this, have been attributed to Baozhi of the Liang dynasty, these are likely products of the Hongzhou school.) It says, "You must just avoid letting your minds dwell upon anything whatsoever, which implies (being unconcerned about) either deeds or no deeds—that is what we call 'receiving a prediction of Buddhahood'." In a similar fashion, Baizhang says that to cling to non-seeking and non-doing is no different from seeking and doing. He says, "A Buddha is one who does not seek; seek this and you turn away. The principle is the principle of nonseeking; seek it and you lose it. If you cling to nonseeking, this is still the same as seeking; if you cling to nondoing, this is the same again as doing."

In a negative statement regarding practice, Dazhu Huihai says:

"Using the mind for practices is like washing dirty things in sticky mud. Prajna is mysterious and wonderful. Itself unbegotten, its mighty functioning is at our service regardless of times and seasons."

On the other hand, Baizhang's record criticizes the view that since one is Buddha one does not need to practice:

To attach to original purity and original liberation, to consider oneself to be a Buddha, to be someone who understands Chan [without actually engaging in practice], that belongs to the way of those heretics who [deny cause and effect] and hold that things happen spontaneously.

Regarding their discussions of monastic training and spiritual cultivation, some gradual training elements can be found in the sources of the Hongzhou school. In one example, Baizhang used the simile of washing a dirty robe to explain how one should study. Similarly, Mazu urges the keeping of pure precepts and the accumulation of wholesome karma, and Da'an's record uses the ox-herding pictures as a way to explain gradual progress on the path. According to Poceski, "a central theme in Baizhang guanglu is Chan practitioners' progression along stages that constitute a path of practice."

These three progressive stages are explained through the "three propositions":

1. At the first stage, one cultivates non-attachment from everything. Poceski describes this as "when encountering all sorts of situations and coming in contact with various phenomena perceived though the senses," the Chan practitioner "is aware of their innate characteristics and is able to ascertain their purity or defilement. Yet, while adept at making such distinctions, he distances himself from everything and gives up all grasping and attachment."
2. At the second stage, one “breaks through the good mind” cultivated at the first stage and one abandons dwelling in a peaceful state of detachment. Baizhang states: "once one does not grasp anymore, and yet does not abide in nonattachment either, that is the intermediate good." Poceski notes that in this stage one "abandons the subtle form of spiritual clinging to the state of nondiscrimination and nonattachment." Poceski adds that "while at this stage the mind is disengaged from the habitual tendency to discriminate and attach to dualistic opposites, and there is attendant reflectivity that prevents reification and dwelling in nonattachment, there is still a subtle sense of self-awareness, as the practitioner is aware of himself as being someone who has relinquished all attachment without being stuck in an unadulterated state of nondiscriminating awareness."
3. The final step entails freeing the mind from the most subtle hindrances, "the last vestiges of attachment and self-centered awareness"..."he must not even give rise to discernment or awareness that the subtlest forms of attachment have been forsaken." As Baizhang describes it: "once one does not abide in nonattachment any more, and does not even engender any understanding of not abiding in it either, that is the final good".

This model is similar in some ways to Huayan school contemplative models, such as the three general discernments of Dushun's Fajie guanmen (Discernment of the Realm of Reality), and the six categories of contemplation found in Fazang's Wangjin huanyuan guan (Discernment of Ending Falsehood and Returning to the Source).

Jinhua Jia points out that while some of the themes of the Baizhang guanglu are in accord with Mazu's ideas, Baizhang's "three propositions" involve an apophasis that differs from the more kataphatic stance of Mazu's sermons and is not found in Zongmi's account of Hongzhou doctrine. According to Jia, apophatic statements begin to appear in controversies over Hongzhou doctrine in the late Tang, with Mazu's second-generation disciples. Thus, Jia's position is that while the Baizhang guanglu may have been based on an original discourse text compiled by Baizhang's disciples, it was also supplemented with the ideas of Baizhang's successors.

Thus, the Hongzhou school was not a static entity, but underwent doctrinal changes from one generation to the next. Jia also observes that the later Hongzhou master Huangbo Xiyun offered a new proposition to complement Mazu's slogan, "ordinary mind is the Way." As Jia observes, while Huangbo maintained Mazu's "this Mind is the Buddha," he changed Mazu's "ordinary mind is the Way" to "no-mind is the Way" as a means of balancing tathāgatagarbha thought with the prajñāpāramitā insight into emptiness. Where "this mind is the Buddha" points to the non-empty aspect of the tathāgatagarbha, "no-mind is the way" points to its emptiness. In this way, Huangbo eschewed the criticism that the Hongzhou school took the buddha-nature to be a permanent entity, as well as the criticism that Hongzhou took the true mind to refer to the deluded mind.

=== Meditation ===
Hongzhou school sources don't contain much sustained discussion on the topic of meditation. Some sources even contain explicit criticisms of certain forms of meditative practice. Poceski claims most of these appear in later unreliable sources. On the other hand, criticism of seated dhyāna can be found in the Bodhidharma Anthology, the earliest extant records of Chan.

One such passage by Mazu states:

If one comprehends the mind and objects, then false thinking is not created again. When there is no more false thinking, that is acceptance of the non-arising of all dharmas. Originally it exists and it is present now, irrespective of cultivation of the Way and sitting in meditation. Not cultivating and not sitting is the Tathāgata's pure meditation.

Some scholars, like Yanagida Seizan think that this passage shows Mazu rejected formal sitting meditation. Luis Gómez also observes that a number of texts exist in the literature which "suggest that some schools of early Ch’an rejected outright the practice of sitting in meditation," although he believes that the conclusion that the Southern School rejected seated meditation outright is mistaken and "has been repeatedly and justly criticized."

According to Poceski, "the passage simply asserts that the originally existing Buddha-nature does not depend on the practice of meditation or any other spiritual exercise—in itself, little more than a sound doctrinal statement. Mazu's position is echoed in canonical texts, most notably the Vimalakīrti." As such, Poceski argues that this passage is best read "as a warning against misguided contemplative practice and advice about the proper approach to spiritual cultivation."

Poceski writes that "this interpretation is reinforced by Guishan jingce, which indicates that the monks at Guishan's monastery (and presumably monks at other monasteries associated with the Hongzhou school) engaged in a regimen of traditional monastic practices, of which meditation was an integral part." Poceski also points to Dayi's Zuochan ming (Inscription on Sitting Meditation) which he says, "presents the practice in fairly conventional terms." However, as McRae points out, the Zuochan ming is only found in a Ming dynasty collection, even though Poceski introduces it as though it might be an early work.

According to Poceski, the lack of attention to meditation in Hongzhou sources is likely to be because their meditation methods were "not that different from those of other contemplative traditions, such as early Chan and Tiantai" though this does not mean they did not interpret them in a unique way according to their own teachings. However, Poceski admits, "We do not have enough evidence to judge the extent to which Mazu and his followers practiced sitting meditation (zuochan)".

One story depicts Mazu practicing sitting meditation (dhyana, chan) but being chided by his teacher Nanyue Huairang, who compared sitting in meditation in order to become a buddha with polishing a tile to make a mirror. According to Faure, this story is critiquing "the idea of 'becoming a Buddha' by means of any practice, lowered to the standing of a 'means' to achieve an 'end'."

== Criticism ==
The Hung-chou school has been criticised for its radical subitism.

Guifeng Zongmi (圭峰 宗密) (780–841), an influential teacher-scholar and patriarch of both the Chan and the Huayan school claimed that the Hung-chou tradition believed "everything as altogether true". Zongmi writes:

Hongzhou school teaches that the arising of mental activity, the movement of thought, snapping the fingers, or moving the eyes, all actions and activities are the functioning of the entire essence of the Buddha-nature. Since there is no other kind of functioning, greed, anger, and folly, the performance of good and bad actions, and the experiencing of their pleasurable and painful consequences are all, in their entirety, Buddha-nature.

According to Zongmi, the Hongzhou school teaching led to a radical non-dualistic view that believed that all actions, good or bad, are expressing Buddha-nature, and therefore denies the need for spiritual cultivation and moral discipline (sila). Zongmi's interpretation of the Hongzhou doctrine would be a dangerously antinomian view, as it eliminates all moral distinctions and validates any actions (including unethical ones) as expressions of the essence of Buddha-nature.

While Zongmi acknowledged that the essence of Buddha-nature and its functioning in the day-to-day reality are but difference aspects of the same reality, he insisted that there is a difference. To avoid the dualism he saw in the Northern Line and the radical nondualism and antinomianism of the Hongzhou school, Zongmi's paradigm preserved "an ethically critical duality within a larger ontological unity", an ontology which he claimed was lacking in Hongzhou Chan.

== Texts ==
Some of the main Tang dynasty sources which contain the teachings of the Hongzhou masters have been translated into English, and include the following:

- Cheng-chien Bhikshu [Mario Poceski] (1992). Sun-Face Buddha: The Teachings of Ma-tsu and the Hung-chou School of Ch'an;
- Cleary, Thomas (1978). Sayings and Doings of Pai-chang;
- Blofeld, John (1987). The Zen Teaching of Instantaneous Awakening: Being the Teaching of the Zen Master Hui Hai, Known as the Great Pearl
- Blofeld, John (1994). The Zen Teaching of Huang-po on the Transmission of Mind.

== Influence - Song-dynasty portrayal ==
Mazu is perhaps the most influential teaching master in the formation of Chan Buddhism in China. When Chan became the dominant school of Buddhism during the Song dynasty, the Tang period of Mazu's school became regarded as the "Golden Age" of Chan. Numerous stories and texts were written celebrating these figures, many of them apocryphal. The stories about the Hongzhou school are part of the Traditional Zen Narrative which rose to prominence in the Song dynasty, when Chan was the dominant form of Buddhism and received the support of the Imperial Court and the elite literati.

According to Mario Poceski, traditional accounts that rely on Song dynasty sources like the Jingde chuandeng lu (Jingde [Era] Record of the Transmission of the Lamp; c. 1004) depict the Hongzhou school as a revolutionary and iconoclastic group that rejected tradition and embraced antinomian practices. In Song texts "we find portrayals of Mazu and his disciples as iconoclasts par excellence, who transgress established norms and subvert received traditions. An example of such radical representations is the story about Mazu's disciple Nanquan (748–834) killing a cat."

During the Song dynasty, the "yü-lü" ("record") genre developed, the recorded sayings of the masters, and the encounter dialogues. The best-known example is the Lin-ji yü-lü. It is part of the Ssu-chia yü lu (Jp. Shike Goruku, The Collection of the Four Houses), which contains the recorded sayings of Mazu Daoyi, Baizhang Huaihai, Huangbo Xiyun and Linji Yixuan. These recorded sayings are well-edited texts, written down up to 160 years after the supposed sayings and meetings.

Some apocryphal “encounter dialogue” (ch: jiyuan wenda, jp: kien mondō) stories depict the Hongzhou school making use of "shock techniques such as shouting, beating, and using irrational retorts to startle their students into realization". The "shock techniques" found in many of these apocryphal stories became part of the traditional and still popular image of Chan masters displaying irrational and strange behaviour to help their students achieve enlightenment. Part of this image was due to later misinterpretations and translation errors, such as the loud belly shout known as he (katsu in Japanese). In Chinese, "he" means "to shout", which has traditionally been translated as "yelled 'he'" - which should mean "yelled a yell" (Note: See James D. Sellmann & Hans Julius Schneider (2003), Liberating Language in Linji and Wittgenstein. Asian Philosophy, Vol. 13, Nos. 2/3, 2003. Notes 26 and 41)

Earlier scholars like D. T. Suzuki and Hu Shih relied on these sources and saw the Hongzhou school as a radical departure from traditional Buddhism. According to modern scholars like McRae, this idea of a "golden age" of iconoclastic and radical Chan masters was mainly a romantic invention of later Song Buddhists:

...what is being referred to is not some collection of activities and events that actually happened in the 8th through 10th centuries, but instead the retrospective re-creation of those activities and events, the imagined identities of the magical figures of the Tang, within the minds of Song dynasty Chan devotees.

Mario Poceski writes:

an unreflective reliance on the Song texts—especially the iconoclastic stories contained in them—is problematic because we cannot trace any of the encounter dialogues back to the Tang period. No source from the Tang period indicates that there was even an awareness of the existence of the encounter‐dialogue format, let alone that it was the main medium of instruction employed in Chan circles. The radicalized images of Mazu, Nanquan, and other Chan teachers from the mid‐Tang period make their first appearance in the middle of the tenth century, well over a century after their deaths. The earliest text that contains such anecdotes is Zutang ji (compiled in 952), and the iconoclastic stories became normative only during the Song period. Accordingly, we can best understand such records as apocryphal or legendary narratives. They were a focal element of imaginative Chan lore created in response to specific social and religious circumstances and served as a centerpiece of an emerging Chan ideology. By means of these stories, novel religious formulations and nascent orthodoxies were retroactively imputed back to the great Chan teachers of the Tang period. The connection with the glories of the bygone Tang era bestowed a sense of sanctity and was a potent tool for legitimizing the Chan school in the religious world of Song China.

== See also ==
- Zen Buddhism
- Chan Buddhism

== Sources ==
- Chappell, David W. (1993). "Hermeneutical Phases in Chinese Buddhism". In Lopez, Donald S. Jr. (ed.). Buddhist Hermeneutics. Delhi: Motilal Banarsidass.
- Dumoulin, Heinrich (2005a), Zen Buddhism: A History. Volume 1: India and China, World Wisdom Books, ISBN 9780941532891
- Faure, Bernard (1997), The Will to Orthodoxy: A Critical Genealogy of Northern Chan Buddhism, Stanford University Press
- Gregory, Peter N. (2002), Tsung-mi and the Sinification of Buddhism, University of Hawai’i Press, Kuroda Institute, (originally published Princeton University Press, 1991, Princeton, N.J.), ISBN 0-8248-2623-X
- Heine, Steven (2008), Zen Skin, Zen Marrow, Oxford: Oxford University Press
- Jia, Jinhua (2006). The Hongzhou School of Chan Buddhism in Eighth- through Tenth-Century China. State University of New York Press.
- Jia, Jinhua (2012). The Hongzhou School of Chan Buddhism in Eighth- through Tenth-Century China. SUNY Press.
- Kasulis, Thomas P. (2003), Ch'an Spirituality. In: Buddhist Spirituality. Later China, Korea, Japan and the Modern World; edited by Takeuchi Yoshinori, Delhi: Motilal Banarsidass
- McRae, John (2003), Seeing Through Zen. Encounter, Transformation, and Genealogy in Chinese Chan Buddhism, The University Press Group Ltd, ISBN 9780520237988
- Poceski, Mario (2007), Ordinary Mind as the Way: The Hongzhou School and the Growth of Chan Buddhism, Oxford University Press
- Poceski, Mario (2010), Monastic Innovator, Iconoclast, and Teacher of Doctrine: The Varied Images of chan Master Baizhang. In: steven Heine and Dale S. Wright 9eds.), "Zen Masters", Oxford University Press
- Schuhmacher, Stephan; Woerner, Gert, eds. (1991), The Shambala Dictionary of Buddhism and Zen, translated by Michael H. Kohn, Boston: Shambala
- Welter, Albert (n.d.), The Textual History of the Linji lu (Record of Linji): The Earliest Recorded Fragments
- Wright, Dale S. (n.d.), The Huang-po Literature
- Yampolski, Philip (2003a), Chan. A Historical Sketch. In: Buddhist Spirituality. Later China, Korea, Japan and the Modern World; edited by Takeuchi Yoshinori, Delhi: Motilal Banarsidass
