= Guiyang school =

School of Chan Buddhism

The Guiyang school (Chinese: 潙仰宗; pinyin: Guīyǎng Zōng, also read Weiyang School) is one of the schools of Chan Buddhism.

== History ==
The Guiyang school was the first established house of the Five Houses of Chán. Guiyang is named after master Guishan Lingyou (771–854) and his disciple, Yangshan Huiji (813–890).

Guishan was a disciple of Baizhang Huaihai, the Chan master whose disciples included Huangbo Xiyun, who in turn taught Linji Yixuan, founder of the Linji school. After founding the Guiyang School, Yangshan moved his school to what is now modern Jiangxi.

The Guiyang school is distinct from the other schools in many ways, notably in its use of esoteric metaphors and imagery in the school's kōans and other teachings.

== Lineage ==
Six Patriarchs
Huineng (638-713)
(Hui-neng, Jpn. Enō)
Nanyue Huairang (677-744)
(Nan-yüeh Huai-jang, Jpn. Nangaku Ejō))
Mazu Daoyi (709-788)
(Ma-tsu Tao-i, Jpn. Baso Dōitsu)
Baizhang Huaihai (720-814)
(Pai-chang Huai-hai, Jpn. Hyakujō Ekai)
Guishan Lingyou (771-853)
(Kuei-shan Ling-yu, Jpn. Isan Reiyū)
Yangshan Huiji (807-883)
(Yang-shan Hui-chi, Jpn. Kyōzan Ejaku)
Guiyang school

== Absorption into the Linji school ==
Over the course of the Song dynasty (960–1279), the Guiyang school, along with the Fayan and Yunmen schools were absorbed into the Linji school. Xuyun attempted to revive these absorbed lineages and succeeded in the case of the Guiyang school.
