= Huangbo Xiyun =

Chinese Buddhist monk (died c. 850)

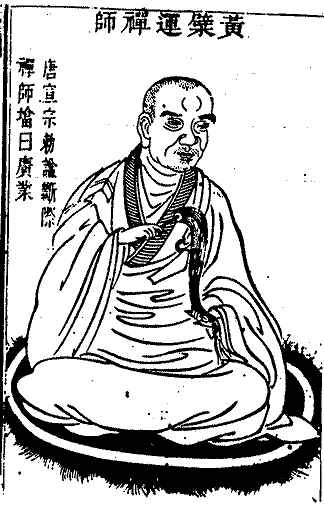
- Title: Ch'an master

Personal life
- Born: unknown China
- Died: 850 Mount Huangbo

Religious life
- Religion: Buddhism
- School: Ch'an
- Lineage: Hung-chou school

Senior posting
- Predecessor: Baizhang Huaihai

Huangbo Xiyun (simplified Chinese: 黄檗希运; traditional Chinese: 黄檗希運; Wade–Giles: Huang-po Hsi-yün; lit. 'Xiyun of Mt. Huangbo', Japanese: Ōbaku Kiun) (died 850 (Note: Huángbò‘s birth and death dates are uncertain. Texts traditionally give his death some time between 847 and 859. see Wright, p. 131 n 1 The 850 date is from Ferguson p. 117)) was an influential master of Chan Buddhism during the Tang dynasty. He was part of the Hongzhou school of Chan founded by Mazu.

Huangbo was a student of Baizhang Huaihai (720–814), and the teacher of Linji Yixuan (J. Rinzai) (died 866) (Wade–Giles: Lin-chi I-hsüan; Japanese: Rinzai Gigen).

== Biography ==
=== Sources ===
Very little about Huangbo's life is known for certain as, unlike other Transmission of the Lamp literature, there is no biographical information included with Huangbo's collection of sayings and sermons, the Chuanxin Fayao (傳心法要, "Essentials of Mind Transmission") and the Wanling Lu (宛陵錄, "Record of Wan-ling"; Japanese: Enryōroku).

He was born in Fuzhou, China. The records indicated that Huangbo was extraordinarily tall. (Note: The Blue Cliff Record claims he was seven feet tall, (Cleary & Cleary, p. 73) and imposing with a small lump on his forehead “shaped like a pearl”, presumed by some writers as a result of his continuous prostrations before the Buddha. (Foster & Shoemaker, p. 91))

=== Monastic life ===
Huangbo began his monastic life on Mount Huangbo in Fujian province, receiving the Buddhist name Xiyun (Hsi-yun). As was the custom of the times, he traveled around seeking instructions from various Chan masters. He visited Mt. Tiantai and sought teachings from the National Teacher Nanyang Huizhong (Wade–Giles: Nan-yang Hui-chung; Japanese: Nan’yō Echū). At some point he may also have studied under Nanquan Puyuan (748–835) (Wade–Giles: Nan-ch’üan P’u-yüan; Japanese: Nansen Fugan), a student of Mazu Daoyi (Wade–Giles: Ma-tsu Tao-i; Japanese: Baso Dōitsu) (709–788)

However, Huangbo's main teacher was Baizhang Huaihai (Wade–Giles: Pai-chang Huai-hai; Japanese: Hyakujo Ekai), another Mazu student, and it was from Baizhang that Huangbo received Dharma transmission. According to Yuanwu Keqin's commentary in The Blue Cliff Record, when Huangbo first met Baizhang, Baizhang exclaimed, “Magnificent! Imposing! Where have you come from?” Huangbo replied, “Magnificent and imposing, I’ve come from the mountains.”

=== Longxing Monastery ===
In 842, a jiedushi official in Jiangxi province, Pei Xiu (Wade–Giles: P’ei Hsiu) (787 or 797–860), invited Huangbo to take up residence at Longxing Monastery. Pei was an ardent student of Chan and received teachings from Huangbo, eventually building a monastery for Huangbo around 846, which the master named Huangbo after the mountain where he had been a novice monk. (Note: Foster & Shoemaker, p. 90 Wright (p 110) gives a different account of the latter years of Huángbò stating that Pei Xiu invited Huángbò after the 841–846 suppression of Buddhism to teach at K’ai-yuan Monastery in 848 and that Huángbò died and was buried on Mount Huángbò.)

=== Death ===
Before Huangbo died, he named thirteen successors, the most prominent of which was Linji Yixuan. He was given the posthumous title (probably under the urging of Pei Xiu who became chief minister of the central government in 853) of “Chan Master Without Limits” (Tuan Chi Ch’an Shih).

John Blofeld says he died on Mount Huangbo during the Dazhong era (大中) of the Tang dynasty, or between 847 and 859. Blofeld says his memorial pagoda is "The Tower of Spacious Karma" and that it was Emperor Xuanzong who gave him the title "The Chan Master Who Destroys All Limitations".

== Teachings ==
=== Sources ===
What is known of Huangbo's teachings comes from two texts, the Chuanxin Fayao (傳心法要, "Essential of Mind Transmission") and the Wanling Lu (宛陵錄, "Record of Wan-ling"; Japanese: Enryōroku) written by Huangbo's student, Pei Xiu. (Note: These two texts are unique in early Chan literature as they can be precisely dated by Pei Xiu who wrote the preface on October 8, 857. They are also the first full-length Zen texts translated in English.) Pei compiled the teachings from his own notes and sent the manuscript to the senior monks on Mount Huangbo for further editing and emendation.

The “official” version of the Huangbo literature was published as part of the Transmission of the Lamp, compiled during the Jingde era (景德) of the Song dynasty, in 1004. The record of Huangbo is more or less equally split between sermons by the master and question and answer dialogues between the master and his disciples and lay people.

=== One Mind ===
Huangbo's teaching centered on the concept of "mind" (Chinese: 心 xin), a central issue for Buddhism since its inception. He taught that mind cannot be sought by the mind. One of his most important sayings was "mind is the Buddha." As such, Buddha and sentient beings are "One Mind." He says:

All the Buddhas and all sentient beings are nothing but the One Mind, beside which nothing exists. The One Mind alone is the Buddha, and there is no distinction between the Buddha and sentient beings.

Huangbo explains that the One Mind is without color, form, or characteristics. He says, "What is right in front of you — that is it." According to Huangbo, "This mind is bright and clear like empty space; it has not even the slightest mark or appearance." Huangbo says:

To awaken suddenly to the fact that your own Mind is the Buddha, that there is nothing to be attained or a single action to be performed – this is the Supreme Way.

As Buddhas and sentient beings are One Mind, Huangbo firmly rejected all dualism between "ordinary" and "enlightened" states:

If you would only rid yourselves of the concepts of ordinary and Enlightened, you would find that there is no other Buddha than the Buddha in your own Mind. The arising and the elimination of illusion are both illusory. Illusion is not something rooted in Reality; it exists because of your dualistic thinking. If you will only cease to indulge in opposed concepts such as ‘ordinary’ and ‘Enlightened’, illusion will cease of itself.

=== A single spiritual brilliance ===
Huangbo connected the One Mind with the single spiritual brilliance (or one pure radiance) of the Śūraṅgama Sūtra, which divides to become the six sense spheres. According to Huangbo, if one can recognize that the eighteen realms (the six sense organs, six sense objects, and corresponding six consciousnesses) have no objective existence, then the six sensory capabilities will be just a single spiritual brilliance. Huangbo likened mind to the sun which shines spontaneously (ziran), "shining without intending to shine." That is, for Huangbo, when one transcends the dharmas of being and non-being, one's mind is like the sun whose brilliance shines naturally, and this requires no effort.

According to Huangbo, since the pure mind is "perfectly bright, its radiance illuminating everywhere," it is thus like the sun in the sky shining in all directions without obstruction. It is only because sentient beings are blinded by their seeing, hearing, sensing and knowing, that they fail to perceive the original essence, which Huangbo describes as "seminal and bright." However, while the original mind is not involved with seeing, hearing, sensing and knowing; at the same time, neither does it exist separately. Thus, for Huangbo, one should not intellectualize or form thoughts on the basis of one's perceptions, and yet neither should one abandon them to seek the original mind elsewhere. In this way, Huangbo says, "there is nowhere that is not the site of enlightenment." Similarly, Huangbo said:

Consider the sunlight. You may say it is near, yet if you follow it from world to world you will never catch it in your hands. Then you may describe it as far away and, lo, you will see it just before your eyes. Follow it and, behold, it escapes you; run from it and it follows you close. You can neither possess it nor have done with it. From this example you can understand how it is with the true Nature of all things and, henceforth, there will be no need to grieve or to worry about such things.

=== Tathāgatagarbha ===
Since all is Buddha-mind, all actions reflect the Buddha, are actions of a Buddha. Huangbo’s teaching on this reflected the Indian concept of the tathāgatagarbha, the idea that within all beings is the nature of the Buddha. Therefore, Huangbo taught that seeking the Buddha was futile as the Buddha resided within:

If you know positively that all sentient beings are already one with Bodhi [enlightenment, Supreme Wisdom], you will cease thinking of Bodhi as something to be attained.

Huangbo was adamant that any form of “seeking” was not only useless, but obstructed clarity:

Sentient beings are attached to forms and so seek externally for Buddhahood. By their very seeking they lose it.

Furthermore, he claimed that

'Studying the Way’ is just a figure of speech [...] In fact, the Way is not something which can be studied. You must not allow this name [the Way] to lead you into forming a mental concept of a road.

=== The three bodies of a Buddha ===
Regarding the three bodies of a Buddha (the dharmakāya, sambhogakāya, and nirmānakāya), Huangbo taught that the two form bodies, the sambhogakāya and nirmānakāya, were not the true Buddha. This is because the form bodies merely respond to circumstances and phenomena, giving teachings in accordance with the differing capabilities of sentient beings, in various appearances and guises. Moreover, for Huangbo, spoken Dharma that responds to events through the senses is not the real Dharma. On the other hand, the dharmakāya preaches the Dharma without anything that is preached or realized. Thus, Huangbo says, "The Dharma body’s preaching of the Dharma cannot be sought with word, voice, shape, or [written] character. It is without anything that is preached and without anything that is realized, but is only the transparency of the self-nature."

=== Non-attachment to written texts ===
According to the accounts, Huangbo avoided clinging to written texts. This is exemplified by the following story:

Pei Xiu presented Huangbo with a text he had written on his understanding of Chan.
Huangbo placed the text down without looking at and after a long pause asked, “Do you understand?”
Pei Xiu replied, “I don’t understand.”
Huangbo said, “If it can be understood in this manner, then it isn’t the true teaching. If it can be seen in paper and ink, then it’s not the essence of our order.”

What Huangbo knew was that students of Chan often became attached to “seeking” enlightenment and he constantly warned against this (and all attachment) as an obstruction to enlightenment:

If you students of the Way wish to become Buddhas, you need study no doctrines whatever, but learn only how to avoid seeking for and attaching yourselves to anything.

Although Huangbo often cautioned students against dependence on textual practices, pointing to the necessity of direct experience over sutra study, his record shows that he was familiar with a wide selection of Buddhist doctrines and texts, including the Diamond Sutra, the Vimalakīrti Sutra and the Lotus Sutra.

=== Hitting and shouting ===
Huangbo was also noted for the manner of his teaching, incorporating the hitting and shouting pioneered by Mazu. There are a number of instances in the record of Huangbo slapping students.

The Blue Cliff Record tells the story of the future emperor of China, hiding in the Chan community as a novice monk, receiving slaps from Huangbo for questioning why Huangbo was bowing to an image of the Buddha.

The most famous instance was when Linji Yixuan was directed by the head monk, Muzhou Daoming, to question Huangbo on the meaning of Buddhism after Linji had been practicing in Huangbo’s monastery for three years without an interview. Three times Linji went to Huangbo and three times the only answer he got was a slap.

His apparent disrespect was extended to his own position:

You people are just like drunkards. I don’t know how you manage to keep on your feet in such a sodden condition. Why everyone will die laughing at you. It all seems so easy, so why do we have to live to see a day like this? Can’t you understand that in the whole Empire of the T’ang there are no "teachers of Zen"?

A monk stepped forth and asked, "How can you say that? At this very moment, as all can see, we are sitting face to face with one who has appeared in the world to be a teacher of monks and a leader of men!"

Please note that I did not say there is no Zen. I merely pointed out that there are no teachers!

=== Overcoming fear ===
While Huangbo was an uncompromising and somewhat fearsome Chan teacher, he understood the nature of fear in students when they heard the doctrine of emptiness and the Void:

Those who hasten towards it [the Void] dare not enter, fearing to hurtle down through the void with nothing to cling to or to stay their fall. So they look to the brink and retreat.

He taught that "no activity" was the gateway of his Dharma but that

All who reach this gate fear to enter. [To overcome this fear, one] must enter it with the suddenness of a knife-thrust.

== Sources ==
- Blofeld, John (1958). The Zen Teachings of Huang Po: On the Transmission of Mind. New York: Grove Press. ISBN 0-8021-5092-6.
- Chang Chung-yuan (1971). Original Teachings of Ch'an Buddhism. Vintage Books. ISBN 0-394-71333-8.
- The Blue Cliff Record. Translated by Cleary, Thomas; Cleary, J.C. Boston: Shambhala Publications. 1992. ISBN 0-87773-622-7.
- Dumoulin, Heinrich (1998) [1994]. Zen Buddhism: A History, Volume I, India and China. Simon & Schuster and Prentice Hall International. ISBN 0-02-897109-4.
- Foster, Nelson; Shoemaker, Jack, eds. (1996). The Roaring Stream: a new Zen reader. Hopewell: The Ecco Press. ISBN 0-88001-344-3.
- Wright, Dale S. (2004). "The Huang-po Literature". In Wright, Dale; Heine, Steven (eds.). The Zen Canon: Understanding the Classic Zen Texts. Oxford University Press. ISBN 0-19-515067-8.

Buddhist titles
Preceded by Baizhang Huaihai	Linji Chan/Rinzai Zen patriarch	Succeeded by Linji Yixuan
