= Joushuu =

Joushuu may refer to:

- Jōshū (disambiguation)
- Zhaozhou (disambiguation)
