= Zhaozhou =

Zhaozhou, formerly romanized Chao-chou, may refer to:

== Places ==
- Zhao Prefecture (肇州, Zhaozhou), former prefecture of imperial China around Zhaozhou County, Heilongjiang
  - Zhaozhou, Heilongjiang (肇州镇), former seat of Zhao Prefecture and present seat of Zhaozhou County
  - Zhaozhou County (肇州县) in Heilongjiang, China
- Zhao Prefecture (赵州, Zhaozhou), former prefecture of imperial China around Zhao County, Hebei
  - Zhaozhou, Hebei (赵州镇), former seat of Zhao Prefecture and present seat of Zhao County

== People ==
- Zhaozhou Congshen (趙州從諗; 778–897), Chinese Chan/Zen Buddhist master

== See also ==
- Zhaozhou Bridge (赵州桥), world's oldest fully stone open-spandrel segmental arch bridge, located in Zhao County, Hebei, China
- Chaozhou, a city in Guangdong, China
- Teochew (disambiguation)
- Joushuu (disambiguation)
