= Nanyang Huizhong =

Nanyang Huizhong 南陽慧忠
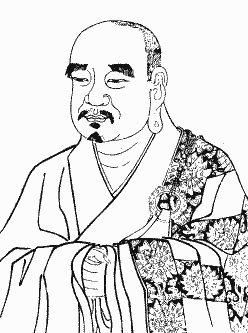
- Title: Chán master

Personal life
- Born: 675
- Died: 775 (aged 100)

Religious life
- Religion: Buddhism
- Denomination: Zen
- School: Chán

Senior posting
- Teacher: Dajian Huineng
- Predecessor: Dajian Huineng

Nanyang Huizhong (Chinese: 南陽慧忠; pinyin: Nányáng Huìzhōng; Japanese: Nan'yō Echū; Korean: Namyang Hyech'ung; Vietnamese: Nam Dương Huệ Trung; 675-775 CE) was a Zen monk during the Tang dynasty. He is often known by his nickname, National Teacher Zhong (Chinese: 忠國師; pinyin: Zhōng Guóshī; Japanese: Chū Kokushi) because he was the personal teacher of the Tang emperors Suzong and Daizong.

== Biography ==
Huizhong was born in Zhuji, but left home at a young age to become a monk under a Vinaya teacher. Huzhong lived through the so-called "Zen Golden Age", during which many important developments took place, especially the fracturing of the East Mountain School into the Northern, Southern, and Sichuan schools. However, the National Teacher avoided associating with any of the various factions. Instead, he is purported to have spent forty uninterrupted years practicing Zen on Baiya Mountain's (白崕) Dangzi Valley (黨子) in Nanyang before being summoned by Emperor Suzong in 761.

At this point his reputation as a master preceded him and he developed a personal connection to the two Chinese emperors, Suzong and Daizong, becoming a major figure at the imperial court. He was also granted the rare title of National Preceptor (guoshi 國師).

Huizhong was known for his critical opinion of some of the southern Hongzhou masters' denial of the importance of sutra-study. Instead, Huizhong emphasized the study of scripture alongside the practice of Chan meditation as the proper way to practice the Zen path. He also criticized the teaching of Mazu Daoyi which said "Buddha is mind" as a kind of naturalistic fallacy.

Huizhong remained an influential figure in later eras, and he is featured in numerous koan collections, including the Blue Cliff Records, The Book of Equanimity, and the Gateless Gate.

Some of his teachings have also survived in Tangut versions found at Khara Khoto.
