= Jōshū =

Jōshū or Joshu may refer to:

- Jōshū (趙州)
  - name of Zhaozhou Congshen (趙州 從諗, Jōshū Jūshin) in Japanese
- Jōshū (城州)
  - Jōshū, another name for Yamashiro Province
- Jōshū (上州)
  - Jōshū, another name for Kōzuke Province
- Jōshū (常州)
  - Jōshū, another name for Hitachi Province
