= Teochew =

Teochew Min or Teochew (潮州; peng'im: Dio^{5}ziu^{1}) is a Southern Min language spoken in Eastern Guangdong and by a Teochew diaspora in Southeast Asia and around the world.

Teochew may also refer to:

- Teochew region (also known as Teo-Swa or Chaoshan), a region of Eastern Guangdong that includes the three municipalities of Chaozhou (Teochew city), Jieyang, and Shantou
- Teochew city (also known as Chaozhou, Chaochow, or Chiuchow), a prefecture-level city within the Teochew region
- Teochew people, an ethnic group originating from the Teochew region and speaking the Teochew language
- Teochew cuisine, a branch of Chinese cuisine created by the Teochew people
- Teochew opera, a branch of traditional Chinese opera originating from the Teochew region and performed in the Teochew language

Chaozhou (the Mandarin romanization of the Chinese characters for Teochew) may also refer to:

- Chaozhou, Pingtung (Chinese: 潮州鎮), an urban township in western Pingtung County, Taiwan
- 5217 Chaozhou, a main belt asteroid

== See also ==
- Zhaozhou (disambiguation)
- Teo-Swa (disambiguation)
