= Teo-Swa =

Teo-Swa may refer to:

- Teo-Swa people, more commonly known as the Teochew people
- Teo-Swa Min, the Southern Min language spoken by the Teo-Swa people, more commonly known as the Teochew language
- Teo-Swa, a cultural-linguistic region covering Chaozhou, Jieyang and Shantou, more commonly known as Chaoshan

== See also ==
- Teochew (disambiguation)
