= Danxia Tianran =

Zen Buddhist monk (739-824)

Danxia Tianran 丹霞天然
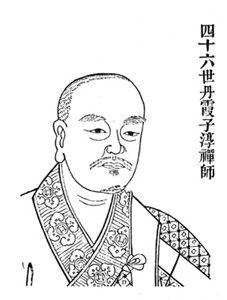
- Portrait of master Danxia Tianran
- Title: Chan master

Personal life
- Born: 739 China
- Died: 824 (aged 84–85)

Religious life
- Religion: Buddhism
- Denomination: Chan/Zen
- School: Hongzhou school Caodong/Sōtō

Senior posting
- Teacher: Mazu Daoyi

Danxia Tianran (739–824) (Chinese: 丹霞天然; Wade–Giles: Tan-hsia Tiān-rán; Japanese: Tanka Tennen) was a Chan/Zen Buddhist monk and poet during the late Tang dynasty. A student of both Mazu Daoyi and Shitou Xiqian, Danxia was famous for his wild and iconoclastic behavior, which became the inspiration for artworks and kōans throughout the Chan/Zen tradition.

== Life ==
Danxia first studied Confucianism, but while traveling to Ch'ang-an to take the imperial exams he stayed at a lodge and dreamed of a white light filling the room, which a diviner interpreted as an omen of understanding emptiness and thereafter a Chan buddhist traveler suggested Danxia pursue Chan Buddhism instead of an imperial job.

Danxia first studied under Mazu Daoyi, who gave him a dharma name Tianran (天然; meaning "son of nature") after Danxia climbed onto the shoulders of a statue of Manjushri in the monk's hall.

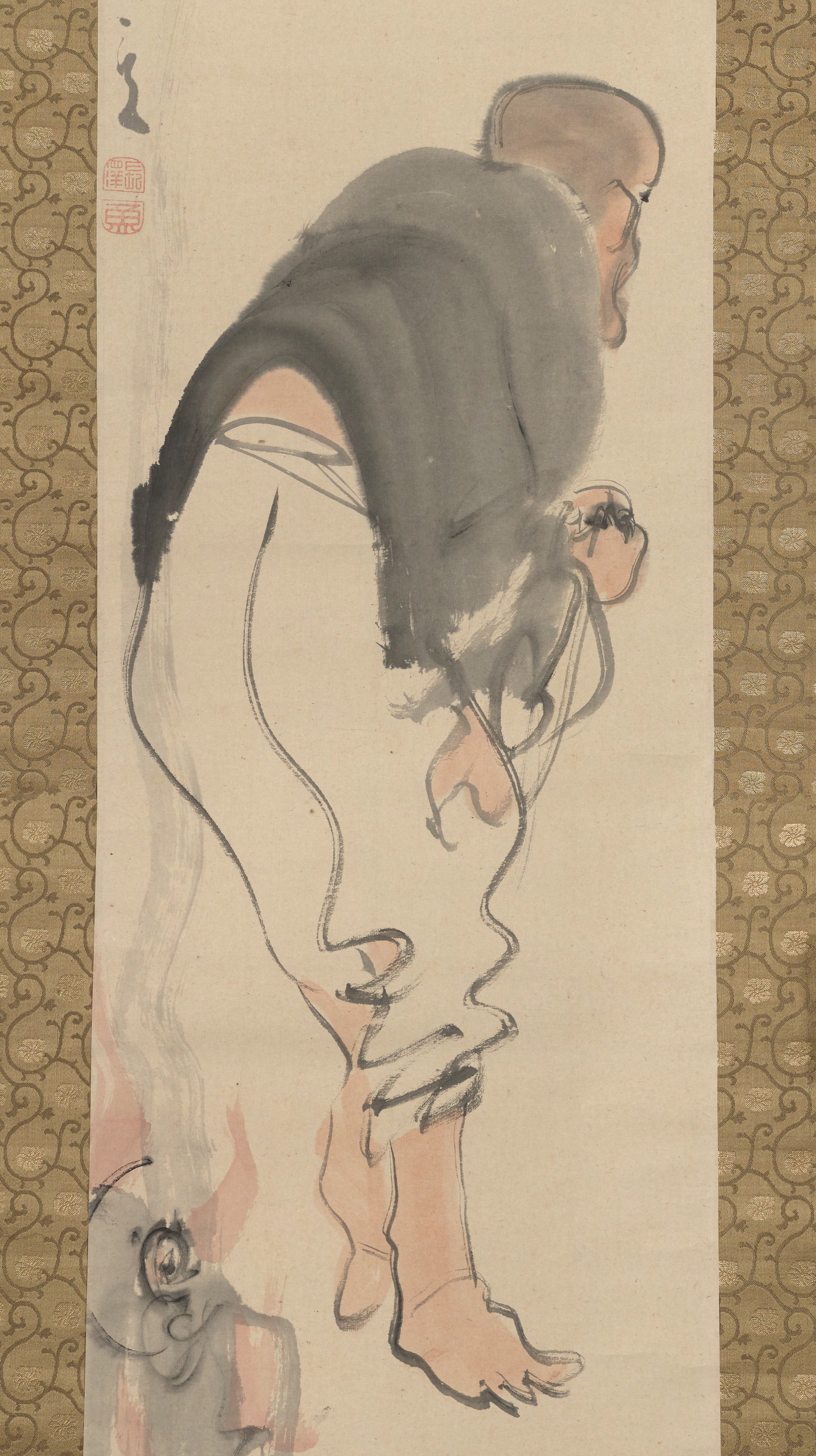
Monk Tanka Burning a Buddha Image by Nagasawa Rosetsu.

After Mazu's death, Danxia journeyed from temple to temple, finally arriving at a temple where he became so cold he took a wooden Buddha statue, chopped it into pieces, and used the wood for a fire to warm himself.

When Danxia became 81 years old, he retired to a hermitage at Mount Danxia in Hunan province where up to three hundred Buddhist students gathered around the mountain and built a monastery around him, with Danxia teaching them in sayings and poems:

Just recognize that Shakyamuni Buddha was a regular old fellow. You must see for yourself. Don't spend your life trying to win some competitive trophy, blindly misleading other blind people, all of you marching right into hell, struggling in duality. I've nothing more to say. Take care!

Four years after arriving at the mountain, he said to his students, “I'm going on a journey once again.” Danxia then readied his traveling hat, robe, and staff. When he put on his pilgrim's sandals, he died before his foot again touched the ground.

== Legacy ==
Danxia's wild and unorthodox behavior became famous within the Chan/Zen Buddhist tradition and beyond. Chinese academic Hu Shih stated that Danxia's actions reflect the intellectual tendencies of a "revolutionary age" and Professor Kaiten Nukariya uses the story of Danxia burning the Buddha statue as a core example of the iconoclasm found in Chan Buddhism. Regarding said story, D. T. Suzuki remarked:

Whatever the merit of [Danxia] from the purely Zen point of view, there is no doubt that such deeds as his are to be regarded as highly sacrilegious and to be avoided by all pious Buddhists.

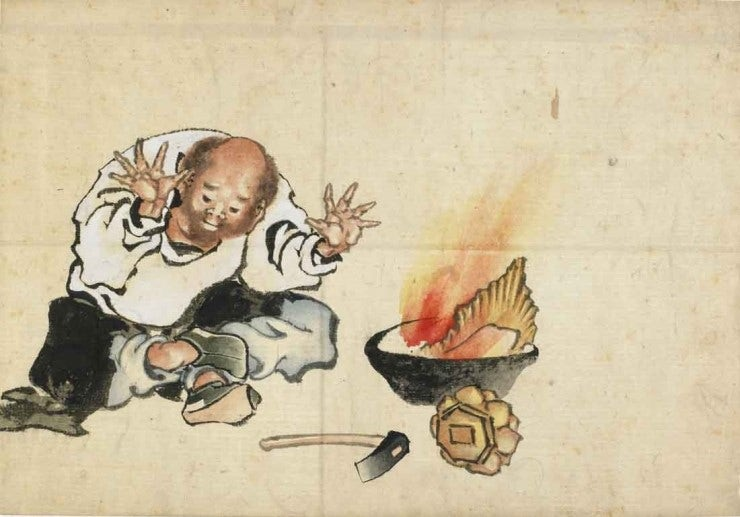
Tanka Burning Buddha by Hokusai (c. Edo era).

The incident of Danxia burning the Buddha statue was portrayed by artists such as Hokusai, Nagasawa Rosetsu, and Sengai.

Danxia is found in kōans within the Record of the Transmission of the Light and in a kōan from the Blue Cliff Record, specifically case 76:

[Danxia] asked a monk, "Where have you come from?" The monk answered, "From the foot of the mountain." [Danxia] asked, "Have you eaten your rice?" The monk said, "Yes I have eaten it." [Danxia] said, "The one who brought rice and gave it to you to eat did he have an (enlightened) eye?" The monk said nothing. Chokei asked Hofuku, "Surely it is an act of thanksgiving to bring rice and give it to the people to eat. How then is it possible not to have an (enlightened) eye?" Hofuku said, "Server and receiver are both blind." Chokei said, "Even if one has done everything, does one still remain blind, or not?" Hofuku said, "Do you call me blind?"

== See also ==
- Buddhism in China
- Mazu Daoyi
- Shitou Xiqian
