= Nanquan Puyuan =

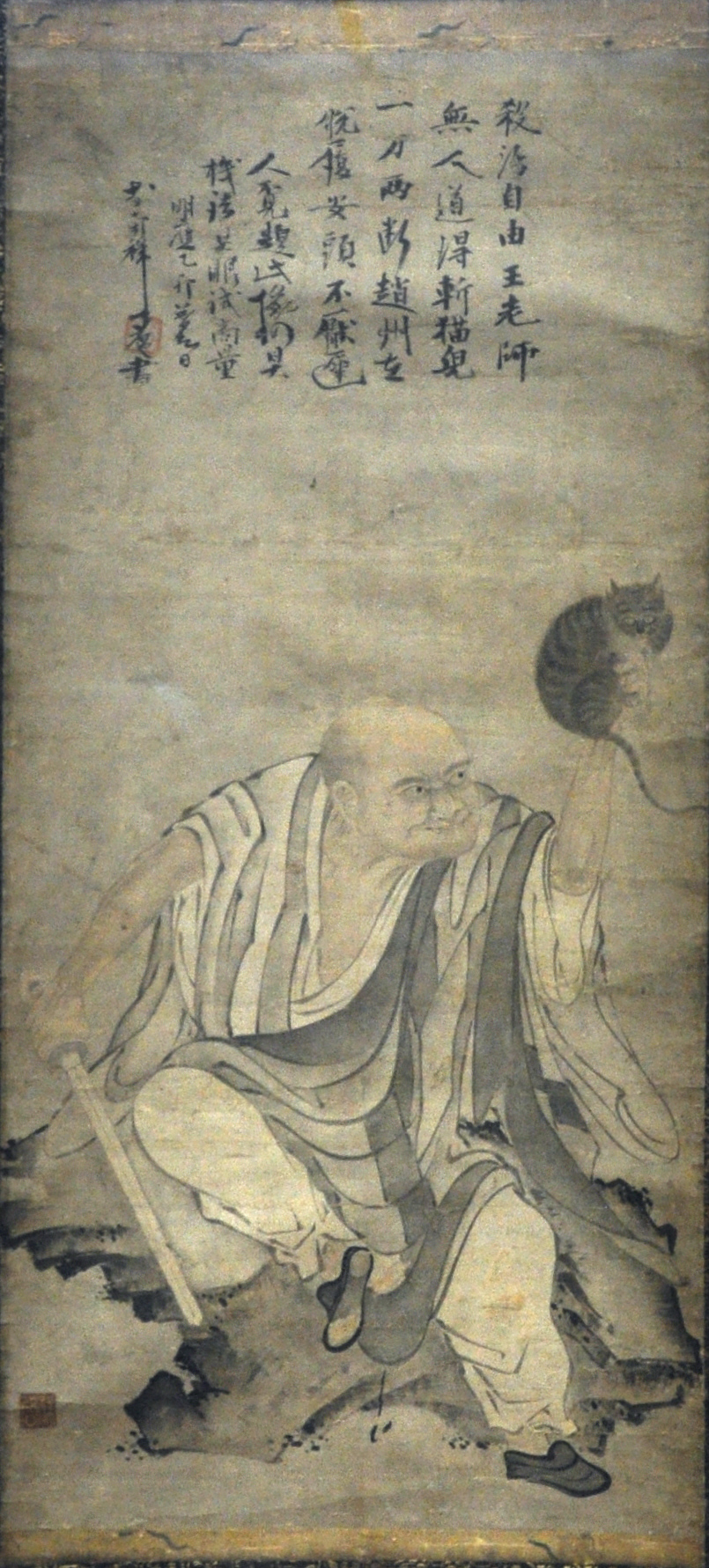
- Case #14 of The Gateless Gate: "Nansen kills the cat"

Personal life
- Born: c. 749
- Died: c. 835

Religious life
- Religion: Buddhism
- School: Hongzhou school

Senior posting
- Teacher: Mazu Daoyi
- Predecessor: Mazu Daoyi
- Successor: Zhaozhou Congshen

Nanquan Puyuan (Chinese: 南泉普願; Wade-Giles: Nan-ch’üan P’u-yüan; Pinyin: Nánquán Pǔyuàn; Japanese: Nansen Fugan; Korean: 남천보원 Namcheon Bowon) (c. 749 – c. 835) was a Chan (Zen) Buddhist master in China during the Tang dynasty. He was a student and Dharma successor of Master Mazu Daoyi (709–788).

== Biography ==
In the year 795, after his enlightenment experience under Mazu, he settled in a self-made hut on Mount Nanquan, from which his dharma name is derived, and lived there in eremitic solitude for three decades. In time, monks persuaded him to come down the mountain and found a monastery; from that time forward, he always had hundreds of students.

== Appearance in koans ==
Nanquan appears in several gong'ans:

- 4 koans in The Gateless Gate (#14, #19, #27, #34),
- 6 koans in the Blue Cliff Record (#28, #31, #40, #63, #64, #69), and
- 3 koans in The Book of Equanimity (#9, #69, #91).

Two gong'ans from the Blue Cliff Record (#28 & #69) depict Nanquan as an advanced student interacting with fellow students of Mazu, and the others depict him as a teacher in his own right.

A well-known koan is case #14 of the Gateless Gate, "Nanquan kills the cat":

Once the monks of the eastern and western Zen halls were quarrelling about a cat. Nansen held up the cat and said, "You monks! If one of you can say a word, I will spare the cat. If you can't say anything, I will put it to the sword." No one could answer, so Nansen finally slew it. In the evening, when Joshu returned, Nansen told him what had happened. Joshu, thereupon, took off his sandals, put them on his head and walked off. Nansen said, "If you had been there, I could have spared the cat."

== Influence ==
Nanquan had seventeen Dharma successors, the most famous of whom was Zhaozhou Congshen (J. Joshu)(778–897). Case #19 of the Gateless Gate recounts an interaction between Nanquan and Zhaozhou that led to the latter having a profound realization; some translators/editors, for example Paul Reps, interpret this as Zhaozhou's enlightenment moment.
