= Mazu Daoyi =

Chinese Buddhist Chan master (709–788)

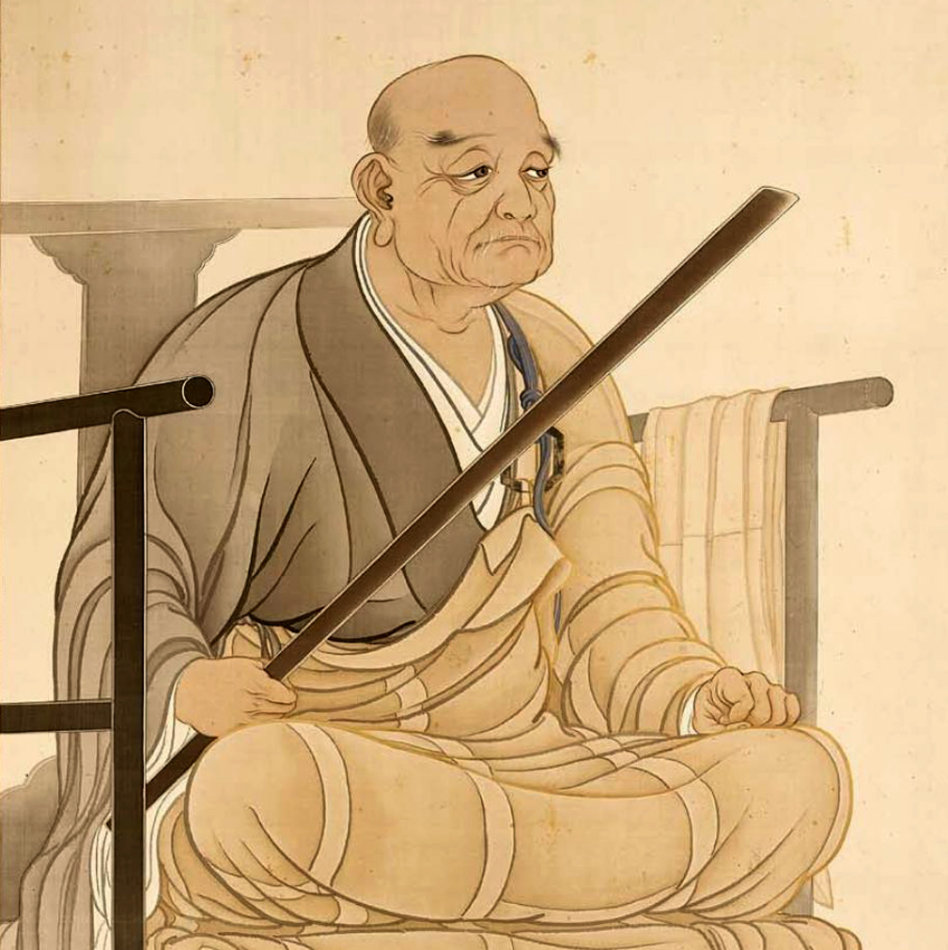
- Title: Chan master

Personal life
- Born: 709 China
- Died: 788

Religious life
- Religion: Buddhism
- School: Chan Buddhism

Senior posting
- Teacher: Nanyue Huairang

Mazu Daoyi (709–788) (Chinese: 馬祖道一; pinyin: Mǎzǔ Dàoyī; Wade–Giles: Ma-tsu Tao-yi, Japanese: Baso Dōitsu) was an influential abbot of Chan/Zen Buddhism during the Tang dynasty. He is known as the founder of the Hongzhou school of Chan. The earliest recorded use of the term "Chan school" is from his Extensive Records.

He is most famously known for his two teaching statements: "This Mind is Buddha" (ji xin shi fo 即心是佛) and "Ordinary Mind is the Way."

== Biography ==
His family name was Ma – Mazu meaning Ancestor Ma or Master Ma. He was born in 709 northwest of Chengdu in Sichuan. During his years as master, Mazu lived in Jiangxi, from which he took the name "Jiangxi Daoyi".

In the Transmission of the Lamp, compiled in 1004, Mazu is described as follows:

His appearance was remarkable. He strode along like a bull and glared about him like a tiger. If he stretched out his tongue, it reached up over his nose; on the soles of his feet were imprinted two circular marks.

According to the Transmission of the Lamp, Mazu was a student of Nanyue Huairang (677-744) at Mount Heng in Hunan

A story in the entry on Nanyue Huairang in the Transmission of the Lamp is regarded as Mazu's enlightenment-account, though the text does not claim it as such. An earlier and more primitive version of this story appears in the Anthology of the Patriarchal Hall which was transcribed in 952:

Reverend Ma was sitting in a spot, and Reverend Rang took a tile and sat on the rock facing him, rubbing it. Master Ma asked, "What are you doing?" Master [Huairang] said, "I'm rubbing the tile to make it a mirror." Master Ma said, "How can you make a mirror by rubbing a tile?" Master [Huairang] said, "If I can't make a mirror by rubbing a tile, how can you achieve buddhahood by sitting in meditation?" (Note: MacRae cites Sodōshū [Anthology of the patriarchal hall], edited by Yanagida Seizan (Kyoto: Chūbun shuppansha 1972), at 72 a14-b3)

This story echoes the Vimalakirti Sutra and the Platform Sutra in downgrading purificative and gradualist practices instead of direct insight into the Buddha-nature.

== Mazu's Hongzhou school ==
Mazu became Nanyue Huairang's dharma–successor. Eventually Mazu settled at Kung-kung Mountain by Nankang, southern Jiangxi province, where he founded a monastery and gathered scores of disciples.

Traditionally, Mazu Daoyi is depicted as a successor in the lineage of Huineng, since his teacher Nanyue Huairang is regarded as a student and successor of Huineng. This connection between Huineng and Nanyue Huairang is doubtful, being the product of later rewritings of Chan history to place Mazu Daoyi in the traditional lineages.

Mazu Daoyi is perhaps the most influential teaching master in the formation of Chan Buddhism. While Chan became the dominant school of Buddhism during the Song dynasty, the earlier Tang dynasty and Mazu Daoyi's Hongzhou school became regarded as the "golden age" of Chan. The An Lushan Rebellion (755-763) led to a loss of control by the Tang dynasty, and metropolitan Chan began to lose its status while "other schools were arising in outlying areas controlled by warlords. These are the forerunners of the Chan we know today. Their origins are obscure; the power of Shen-hui's preaching is shown by the fact that they all trace themselves to Hui-neng."

This school developed "shock techniques such as shouting, beating, and using irrational retorts to startle their students into realization". These shock techniques became part of the traditional and still popular image of Chan masters displaying irrational and strange behaviour to aid their students. Part of this image was due to later misinterpretations and translation errors, such as the loud belly shout known as katsu. In Chinese "katsu" means "to shout", which has traditionally been translated as "yelled 'katsu'" – which should mean "yelled a yell." (Note: See James D. Sellmann & Hans Julius Schneider (2003), Liberating Language in Linji and Wittgenstein. Asian Philosophy, Vol. 13, Nos. 2/3, 2003. Notes 26 and 41)

During 845-846 staunchly Taoist Emperor Wuzong of Tang persecuted Buddhist schools in China along with other dissidents, such as Christians:

It was a desperate attempt on the part of the hard-pressed central government, which had been in disarray since the An Lu-shan rebellion of 756, to gain some measure of political, economic, and military relief by preying on the Buddhist temples with their immense wealth and extensive lands.

This persecution was devastating for metropolitan Chan, but the school of Mazu and his likes survived, and took a leading role in the Chan of the later Tang.

== Teachings ==
Mazu Daoyi's teachings and dialogues were collected and published in the Jiangxi Daoyi Chanshi Yulu "Oral Records of Chan Master Daoyi from Jiangxi". (Note: For these Extensive Records of the dialogues of Mazu, see volume 119 of Wan-tzu hsu-tsang-ching [Newly Compiled Continuation of the Buddhist Canon] (Taipei: Hsin-wen-feng 1977), reprint of Dainippon zoku zokyo)

=== Doctrinal Background ===
Relying on the well-known essence-function paradigm, Mazu taught that buddha-nature manifests in function and that function was identical to buddha-nature. As Jinhua Jia points out, in this he seems to have been directly influenced by the Huayan doctrine of nature-origination in which all phenomena are manifestations of the Tathāgata. The doctrine of nature-origination is closely associated with the related Huayan teaching of the unobstructed interpenetration of principle and phenomena (li-shih wu-ai). Where "principle" (li), or the absolute, refers to the mind as suchness; "phenomena" (shih) refers to the mind subject to birth-and-death. Regarding the meaning of the interfusion of principle and phenomena, the Huayan patriarch Fazang explains that the tathāgatagarbha, whose self-nature is neither born nor annihilated, accomplishes all phenomena in accordance with conditions. He says, "The principle and phenomena interfuse and are not obstructed, thus one-mind and the two truths are not obstructed." Similarly, Mazu taught, "The absolute and the phenomenal are without difference; both are wonderful functions."

However, according to Jia, while Mazu's theory that Buddha-nature manifests in function is similar to the Huayan doctrine of nature-origination, there is nonetheless a difference. Jia says:

...while their theoretical frameworks are the same, the target and content of the Huayan nature-origination and Mazu’s idea that function is identical with Buddha-nature are nevertheless different. In the Huayan theory, the pure Buddha-nature remains forever untainted, even though it gives rise to defiled phenomena and originates the realization of all sentient beings’ enlightenment. In Mazu’s doctrine, the spontaneous, ordinary state of human mind and life, which is a mix of purity and defilement, is identical with Buddha-nature.

=== Ordinary Mind is the Way ===
It is within this doctrinal context that Mazu affirmed the "fundamental value of the human being" which Yanagida Seizan saw as the basic standpoint of Linji Yixuan, but as Jinhua Jia points out, it can actually be traced back to Mazu. "Ordinary mind is the Way" was perhaps Mazu's most famous slogan. He says:

If you want to know the Way directly, then ordinary mind is the Way. What is an ordinary mind? It means no intentional creation or action, no right or wrong, no grasping or rejecting, no terminable or permanent, no profane or holy. The sūtra says, “Neither the practice of ordinary men, nor the practice of sages—that is the practice of the Bodhisattva.” Now all these are just the Way: walking, abiding, sitting, lying, responding to conditions, and handling matters.

Jia states that "identifying absolute buddha-nature with the ordinary human mind, Mazu confirmed that the entirety of daily life was of ultimate truth and value." Similarly, Peter Gregory observes that Mazu's Hongzhou school collapses essence (buddha-nature) into function ("all activities—whether good or bad, enlightened or deluded"). As an example of this, when Fenzhou Wuye told Mazu he did not understand the meaning of "this mind is the Buddha," Mazu responded: "This very mind that doesn't understand is it, without any other thing."

Mazu's sermons indicate that awakening and ignorance form a false dichotomy since "originally there is no ignorance," and hence "awakening also need not be established." He says, "Since limitless kalpas, all sentient beings have never left the samādhi of dharma-nature, and they have always abided in the samādhi of dharma-nature. Wearing clothes, eating food, talking and responding, making use of the six senses, all activities are dharma-nature." Accordingly, there was no need to deliberately try to enter into samādhi since, as Mazu says, "You are the diamond-samādhi by yourself, without again intending to attain samādhi by concentration." (Note: Compare with the teachings of Shenhui who taught that entering into and exiting from concentration were still conditioned and failed to transcend the false mind: "If there is exiting from and entering into concentration [...] then this is to completely fail to transcend the false mind, to be with that which is attained, to be conditioned." See also Xuance's words in the Platform Sutra: "How can you enter it or come out of it? If there is entering and coming out, then this is not the great samādhi.")

Modern scholars interpret Mazu's ordinary mind in various ways. Mario Poceski connects ordinary mind with the early Chan teaching of no-mind. According to Poceski, this refers to an unattached mind free of impurity and defilements. On the other hand, Jia takes ordinary mind to refer to "the complete, empirical human mind of good and evil, purity and defilement, enlightenment and ignorance of ordinary people." In this way, Jia understands Mazu's doctrine to point to the spontaneous state of the human mind which is a mix of purity and impurity.

John McRae offers an alternative position to both Poceski and Jia, which is that of the Japanese scholar Ogawa Takashi. According to this view, ordinary mind is neither a pure mind divorced from all defilements (as Poceski understands it), nor a capacious container of enlightened and unenlightened mentalities (as Jia understands it). Instead, this view takes ordinary mind to be "the fundamental capability of cognition, the bare working of the human mind" which is functioning all the time, perfectly and automatically, as "primordial cognitive capacity."

=== Attitude towards cultivation ===
Mazu taught that the Way cannot be cultivated, since whatever is attained through cultivation will still be subject to decay. Mazu says:

[It] originally existed and exists at present. It does not depend on the cultivation of the Way and seated meditation. Neither cultivation nor seated meditation—this is the pure Chan (dhyāna) of Tathāgata.

However, while the Way cannot be cultivated, Mazu does say it can be defiled by "intentional creation and action." He says, "The Way needs no cultivation, just not defiling it. What is defilement? When you have a mind of birth and death and an intention of creation and action, all these are defilement." For Mazu, the Way belongs neither to cultivation nor even to non-cultivation, since to practice the former is to be like the śrāvakas (who follow the Hīnayāna), while falling into the latter position is to be no different than a pṛthagjana, an ordinary, worldly person.

=== Original Enlightenment ===
Mazu taught that the mind is originally pure "without waiting for cleaning and wiping." Mazu says:

This mind originally existed and exists at present, without depending on intentional creation and action; it was originally pure and is pure at present, without waiting for cleaning and wiping. Self-nature attains nirvāna; self-nature is pure; self-nature is liberation; and self-nature departs [from delusions].

Although Mazu did not use the term, as Jia points out, this relates to the doctrine of original enlightenment (benjue). Indeed, Mazu said, "All of you should believe that your mind is Buddha, that this mind is identical with Buddha."

In the famous East Asian śāstra, the Awakening of Faith, original enlightenment is situated among two other terms, "non-enlightenment" (bujue) and "actualized enlightenment" (shijue), and the three together form a cycle of religious practice. That is, in the Awakening of Faith, although all beings are originally enlightened, they do not recognize this fact and this constitutes non-enlightenment. They must therefore engage in religious practice to achieve actualized enlightenment which leads one back to one's original enlightenment. However, as Jia points out, Mazu's approach is different. Where the Awakening of Faith teaches a cycle of practice of moving from non-enlightenment through actualized enlightenment and finally back to original enlightenment, Mazu simplifies the cycle, emphasizing only original enlightenment. Thus, one can discover that which "originally existed and exists at present" without any need for religious practice.

=== Criticism of seated meditation ===
A well-known story found in Mazu's biography depicts Mazu being rebuked for practicing seated dhyāna (meditation) 'to become a Buddha', by his teacher, Nanyue Huairang, who compared sitting in meditation in order to become a buddha with polishing a tile to make a mirror. During this famous encounter, Nanyue Huairang says to Mazu:

Are you practicing to sit in meditation, or practicing to sit like a Buddha? As to sitting in meditation, meditation is neither sitting nor lying. As to sitting like a Buddha, the Buddha has no fixed form. In the non-abiding Dharma, one should neither grasp nor reject. If you try to sit like a Buddha, you are just killing the Buddha. If you attach to the form of sitting, you will never realize the principle.

In a similar critique, Mazu says, "Originally it exists and it is present now, irrespective of cultivation of the Way and sitting in meditation. Not cultivating and not sitting is the Tathāgata's pure meditation." Yanagida Seizan saw this passage as an indication that Mazu rejected formal sitting meditation. According to Mario Poceski, Yanagida's stance reflects "popular views about classical Chan's rejection of formal meditation, which go back to Hu Shi's pioneering studies of Shenhui and early Chan history." For Poceski, this passage "simply asserts that the originally existing Buddha-nature does not depend on the practice of meditation or any other spiritual exercise," a doctrinal position which can also be found in the Vimalakīrti Sūtra.

Bernard Faure observes that seated dhyana was a point of contention in the developing Chan school, noting that quietist tendencies are criticized in the Vimalakīrti Sūtra. Criticism of seated dhyāna can be found in Shenhui's attacks on the so-called Northern school. As Faure states, for Shenhui, "the true practice must be non-intentional (wuzuo)," (Note: According to Luis Gómez, although modern scholarship has assumed that Shenhui rejected meditation outright, Shenhui is "not clear on the important question of the practice of meditation." Shenhui reluctantly acknowledges that some kind of "polishing" is necessary, however on this point he is ambiguous. Gómez states that Shenhui "never explains what this 'polishing' means. We have no way of knowing whether it refers to some form of meditation practice." Gómez states that for Shenhui, "The point at issue is not so much whether one sits in zazen or not, but whether thoughts should be allowed to arise in the process of meditation." Gómez maintains that for Shenhui, samādhi is not a "quietistic state of immobile contemplation" characterized by "absence of mental content and activity," but is rather "defined apophatically, as single minded detachment from all objects and practices." Gómez says, "Clearly Shen-hui's practice is not sitting nor is it concentration—that is, it is not fixing (ting) the mind on an object. It is based on the Vimalakīrti-nirdeśa's description of samādhi as movement," which is "a technique that does not remove or erase the multiplicity of objects from the mind." Although Gómez observes that "a number of passages in the literature suggest that some schools of early Ch’an rejected outright the practice of sitting in meditation," he believes the conclusion that the Southern School rejected seated meditation outright is mistaken and "has been repeatedly and justly criticized." For Gómez, the point was not whether sitting or not sitting was necessary, but that attempting to "concentrate" and "purify" the mind was to misunderstand the "non-dual nature of enlightenment.") a stance also illustrated in Mazu's dialogue with Nanyue (which Faure deems to be fictional). According to Faure, Nanyue's criticism is directed at "the idea of 'becoming a Buddha' by means of any practice, lowered to the standing of a 'means' to achieve an 'end'."

Faure notes that seated dhyāna as mere quietism was also condemned by Linji, who criticized the practitioner who "sits down cross-legged with his back against a wall, his tongue glued to the roof of his mouth, completely still and motionless." For Linji, "motion and motionlessness are merely two kinds of states; it is the non-dependent Man of the Way who utilizes motion and utilizes motionlessness." Faure further maintains that criticism of seated dhyāna as quietism reflects a resentment toward the socio-economic role and position of monks in Tang society who, quoting Gernet, "undertook only pious works, reciting sacred texts and remaining seated in dhyāna".

Some worried that the spontaneity and emphasis on wisdom (direct insight) promoted by Mazu could be misunderstood, and despite the criticisms and doctrinal debates, seated dhyāna continued to be practiced, even by many of its critics. Guifeng Zongmi, heir to Shenhui's Heze School, successfully sought to restore the balance between concentration and wisdom which had been disturbed by Shenhui's sudden rhetoric and emphasis on wisdom. Regarding the stance of the Vimalakīrti Sūtra, according to Zongmi, although it says that it is not necessary to sit, this does not mean that it is necessary not to sit. Zongmi says, "Whether or not to be seated depends on what is most suited to the capacities of the practitioner."

=== Shock techniques ===
Mazu Daoyi is depicted as having employed novel and unconventional teaching methods in order to shake his students out of routine consciousness. Mazu is credited with the innovations of using katsu (sudden shouts), striking, kicking, and unexpectedly calling to a person by name as that person is leaving. Mazu also employed silent gestures, non-responsive answers to questions, and was known to grab and twist the nose of a disciple. Utilizing a variety of sudden shocks, he sought to enable his students to experience enlightenment through the collapse of habitual feeling and thinking. According to Bielefeldt, such methods reflect a shift in emphasis within Zen from essence, or substance (t'i), to function (yung).

John McRae points out that such things as calling to a person by name just as they are leaving bring the attention of the student to the perfection of their automatic response, "yes?" Presenting the view of Japanese scholar Ogawa Takashi, McRae says the goal was "to alert the student to the fact that his Buddha-like ordinary mind was functioning perfectly all the time, like the selfless and undefiled reflection of the mirror, even as the student used that 'ordinary mind' to pose questions and respond automatically to his own name." This "represents the fundamental capability of cognition, the bare working of the human mind" as "primordial cognitive capacity."

== Depiction in the later Koan literature ==
Mazu appears in later Song dynasty Chan anthologies of transmission, encounter dialogues and koans:

- Transmission of the Lamp, compiled in 1004 by Shi Daoyuan (Chinese: 释道原)
- Blue Cliff Record. compiled with commentary by Yuanwu Keqin (1063–1135) circa 1125; (Note: Mazu appears at koans #3 (at 25-28), #53 (255-259), #73 (324-328). At #53 Mazu discusses "wild ducks flying" with Baizhang Huaihai (WG: Pai-chang Huaihai). This collection was brought to Japan by Sōtō Zen master Dogen Kigen (1200-1253), and thereafter has received intense scrutiny, being recognized as the "foremost of Zen texts" by the Rinzai Zen school.)
- The Gateless Gate compiled circa 1228 by Wumen Huikai (1183–1260). (Note: Koans from the Gateless Gate text are presented, with Mazu (under his Japanese name Baso) quoted at #30 (at 114) and #33 (at 117))

Other anthologies where Mazu appears include:

- Records of Pointing at the Moon (compiled 1602),
- Recorded Saying of the Ancient Worthies (compiled 1271),
- Records of the Regular Transmission of the Dharma (1062). (Note: These and other sources for Mazu Daoyi are given by Chang Chung-yuan in his Original Teachings of Ch'an Buddhism (New York: Pantheon 1969; reprint Vintage 1971) at 308-309.) (Note: Erudition can be suspect in Ch'an/Zen. "I know that erudition disturbs enlightenment", wrote Keizan Zenji (1268-1325) of the Soto school in the Book of the Transmission. He quotes the Kegon Sutra, "A poor man who counts another's treasure cannot have his own. Erudition is like this." Cited by Jiyu Kennett in her Selling Water by the River. A Manual of Zen Training (New York: Pantheon 1969; reprint Vintage 1972) at 38-39.)

=== Examples ===
Mazu was particularly fond of using the phrase "What the mind is, what the Buddha is." In the particular case of Damei Fachang, hearing this brought about an awakening. Later this same statement was contradicted by Mazu when he taught "No mind, No Buddha":

A monk asked why the Master [Mazu] maintained, "The Mind is the Buddha." The Master answered, "Because I want to stop the crying of a baby." The monk persisted, "When the crying has stopped, what is it then?" "Not Mind, not Buddha", was the answer.

Other examples of kōans in which Mazu figures are as follows:

When sick Mazu was asked how he felt; he replied, "Sun Face Buddha. Moon Face Buddha."

P'ang asked Mazu, "Who is it who is not dependent upon the ten thousand things?" Matsu answered, "This I'll tell you when you drink up the waters of the West River in one gulp".

A monk asked Mazu, "Please indicate the meaning of Ch'an directly, apart from all permutations of assertion and denial." Mazu told him to ask Zhiang. Zhiang paused, then said for him to ask Baizhang. Baizhang seemed to say he didn't understand. The monk returned to Mazu and related what happened. Mazu observed dryly that Zhiang had white hair, while Baizhang's was black.

== Successors ==
Among Mazu's immediate students were Baizhang Huaihai (720-814) (Note: Baizhang drafted a new set of vinaya meant especially for Chan monks. Edward Conze, A Short History of Buddhism (London: George Allen & Unwin 1980) at 89.) (Note: Baizhang composed the saying: "A day without work, a day without food.") (Note: Baizhang was "a dedicated disciple of Mazu and served as his attendant for twenty years.") Nanquan Puyuan (748-835), Fenzhou Wuye (760-821), Danxia Tianran (739-824), and Damei Fachang (752-839).

A generation later his lineage through Baizhang came to include Huangbo Xiyun (d.850), and his celebrated successor Linji Yixuan (d.866). From Linji Yixuan derived the Linji school and the Japanese sect, the Rinzai school.

A second line was Guishan Lingyou (771-853), to whom the Guiyang school was named, and therein Yangshan Huiji (807-883).

Six Patriarchs
Huineng (638-713) (Hui-neng, Jpn. Enō)
Nanyue Huairang (677-744) (Nan-yüeh Huai-jang, Jpn. Nangaku Ejō))
Mazu Daoyi (709-788) (Ma-tsu Tao-i, Jpn. Baso Dōitsu)
Nanquan Puyuan (748-835) (Nan-ch'üan p'u-yüan, Jpn. Nansen Fugan)	Baizhang Huaihai (720-814) (Pai-chang Huai-hai, Jpn. Hyakujō Ekai)
Zhaozhou Congshen (778--879) (Chao-chou Ts'ung-shen, Jpn. Jōshū Jūshin)	Huangbo Xiyun (d.850) (Huang-po Hsi-yüan, Jpn. Ōbaku Kiun)	Guishan Lingyou (771-853) (Kuei-shan Ling-yu, Jpn. Isan Reiyū)
	Linji Yixuan (d.866) (Lin-chi I-hsüan, Jpn. Rinzai Gigen)	Guiyang school
	Linji school

== Criticism ==
The Hung-chou school has been criticised for its radical subitism.

Guifeng Zongmi (圭峰 宗密) (780–841), an influential teacher-scholar and patriarch of both the Chán and the Huayan school claimed that the Hung-chou tradition believed "everything as altogether true".

According to Zongmi, the Hung-chou school teaching led to a radical nondualism that believed that all actions, good or bad, are expressions of the essential Buddha-nature and therefore denied the need for spiritual cultivation and moral discipline. This was a dangerously antinomian view as it eliminated all moral distinctions and validated any actions as expressions of the essence of Buddha-nature.

While Zongmi acknowledged that the essence of Buddha-nature and its functioning in the day-to-day reality are but different aspects of the same reality, he insisted that there is a difference. To avoid the dualism he saw in the Northern Line and the radical nondualism and antinomianism of the Hung-chou school, Zongmi's paradigm preserved "an ethically critical duality within a larger ontological unity."

== Sources ==
- Abe, Masao (1975), Zen and Western Thought, University of Hawaii
- Ch'en (1964), Buddhism in China. A historical survey, Princeton University
- Chung-Yuan, Chang (1971) [1969, New York, Pantheon 1969], Original Teachings of Ch'an Buddhism. Selected from "Transmission of the Lamp", Vantage)
- Cleary, Thomas (ed., transl.) (1992), The Blue Cliff Record, Boston: Shambhala 1992
- Cowie, A.P.; Evison, A. (1986), Concise English-Chinese Chinese-English Dictionary, Beijing: The Commercial Press
- Dumoulin, Heinrich (1965), A History of Zen Buddhism, Random House McGraw-Hill
- Dumoulin, Heinrich (2005), Zen Buddhism: A History. Volume 1: India and China, World Wisdom Books, ISBN 978-0-941532-89-1
- Faure, Bernard (1997), The Will to Orthodoxy: A Critical Genealogy of Northern Chan Buddhism, Stanford University Press
- Gomez, Luis O. (1991), Purifying Gold: The Metaphor of Effort and Intuition in Buddhist Thought and Practice. In: Peter N. Gregory (editor)(1991), Sudden and Gradual. Approaches to Enlightenment in Chinese Thought, Delhi: Motilal Banarsidass Publishers Private Limited
- Gregory, Peter N. (2002), Tsung-mi and the Sinification of Buddhism, University of Hawai’i Press, Kuroda Institute, (originally published Princeton University Press, 1991, Princeton, N.J.), ISBN 0-8248-2623-X
- Heine, Steven (2008), Zen Skin, Zen Marrow
- Kasulis, Thomas P. (2003), Ch'an Spirituality. In: Buddhist Spirituality. Later China, Korea, Japan and the Modern World; edited by Takeuchi Yoshinori, Delhi: Motilal Banarsidass
- McRae, John (2003), Seeing Through Zen. Encounter, Transformation, and Genealogy in Chinese Chan Buddhism, The University Press Group Ltd, ISBN 978-0-520-23798-8
- Perkins, Dorothy (1999), Encyclopedia of China, New York: Facts on File 1999
- Reps, Paul (1958), Zen Flesh, Zen Bones, Rutland/Tokyo: Charles E. Tuttle 1958
- Schuhmacher and Woerner (editors) (1991), Fischer-Schreiber; Ehrhard; Diener (eds.), The Shambala Dictionary of Buddhism and Zen, Michael H. Kohn (trans.), Boston: Shambala
- Shih, Heng-ching (1992), The Syncretism of Ch'an and Pure Land Buddhism, New York: Peter Lang 1992
- Suzuki, D.T. (1974) [1934, Kyoto, Eastern Buddhist Society], Manual of Zen Buddhism, Ballantine
- Watson, Burton (ed., transl.) (1993), The Zen Teachings of Master Lin-chi. A translation of the Lin-chi Lu, Boston: Shambhala
- Yampolski, Philip (2003), Chan. A Historical Sketch. In: Buddhist Spirituality. Later China, Korea, Japan and the Modern World; edited by Takeuchi Yoshinori, Delhi: Motilal Banarsidass
- Poceski, Mario (2007), Ordinary Mind as the Way: The Hongzhou School and the Growth of Chan Buddhism, Oxford University Press, ISBN 978-0-19-531996-5

Buddhist titles
Preceded by Nanyue Huairang	Linji Chan/Rinzai Zen patriarch	Succeeded by Baizhang Huaihai
