= Guishan Lingyou =

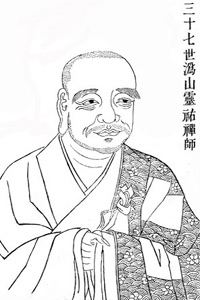
Kuj san Ling ju

Guishan Lingyou (Chinese: 溈山靈祐; pinyin: Guīshān / Wéishān Língyòu; Japanese: Isan Reiyu) (771–853) was a Chinese Chan master during the Tang dynasty and the founder of the Guiyang school.

== Life ==
- 771: born under the secular surname Zhao, born in Changxi, Fujian province
- 785: became a Buddhist monk at age 15, received tonsure ceremony at Shanjian Temple in Fujian, received the monastic precepts at Longxing Temple in Hangzhou where he studied sutra and Vinaya Pitaka.
- 793: at age 23, followed Zen Master Baizhang Huaihai, as his dharma heir disciple
- 820: in 805 Zhao left the temples of Fujian to go on a spiritual journey at the age of 34. Zhao spent years in the mountains to express his gratitude for a Buddhist deity through a daily set of 10,000 punches followed by prayers everyday without rest for 15 years. Upon descending from the mountains, Zhao was famed and revered for his ability to

To display Buddhist physical strength, compassion and wisdom.

- 853: died at age 83
