= Katsu (Zen) =

Shout used in Buddhism

Katsu (Chinese: 喝; Pinyin: hè, Wade-Giles: ho; Cantonese: hot3, rōmaji: katsu) is a shout that is described in Chan and Zen Buddhism encounter-stories, to expose the enlightened state (Japanese: satori) of the Zen-master, and/or to induce initial enlightenment experience in a student. The shout is also sometimes used in the East Asian martial arts for a variety of purposes; in this context, katsu is very similar to the shout kiai.

== Etymology ==
The word in Chinese means literally "to yell" or "to shout." In Japanese it has also developed the meaning of "to browbeat", "to scold", and "hoarse."

In the context of Chan and Zen practice, the word is not generally used in its literal meaning(s), but rather—much as with the martial arts shout of kiai—as fundamentally a means of focusing energy. When the Chan and Zen practice of the katsu first emerged in Jiangxi province in the south of Tang dynasty China in the 8th century CE, the word was pronounced roughly as /xat/ in Middle Chinese, which is preserved in modern Mandarin as hè, in Cantonese as hot3, in Southern Min as hat as well as in the Japanese on'yomi ("Sino-Japanese") reading of the character as Japanese pronunciation: [katsɯ].

== Use ==
The katsu shout, insofar as it represents a kind of verbal harshness and even violence, can be considered a part of the Mahāyāna Buddhist doctrine of "skill-in-means" (Sanskrit: upāya-kauśalya), which essentially teaches that even an action or practice which seems to violate Buddhist moral guidelines—in this case, the Noble Eightfold Path's injunction against "abusive speech"—is permissible, and even desirable, so long as it is done with the aim of ultimately putting an end to suffering and introducing others to the dharma, or teachings of Buddhism.

The most celebrated and frequent practitioner of the katsu was the Chinese master Línjì Yìxuán (?–866), and many examples of his use of the shout can be found in the Linji lu (臨済錄; Japanese: Rinzai-roku), or Record of Linji, the collection of Linji's actions and lectures:

A monk asked, "What is the basic meaning of Buddhism?" The Master gave a shout. The monk bowed low. The Master said, "This fine monk is the kind who's worth talking to!"

The use of the katsu stands in a tradition of antinomian methods, such as striking disciples with a stick or a fly whisk, which developed within the Mazu Daoyi (709–788) lineage. Linji greatly developed and used the katsu technique. In one of his lectures, often termed as "Linji's Four Shouts" he distinguished four different categories of katsu:

The Master said to a monk, "At times my shout is like the precious sword of the Diamond King. At times my shout is like a golden-haired lion crouching on the ground. At times my shout is like the search pole and the shadow grass. At times my shout doesn't work like a shout at all. Do you understand?" The monk started to answer, whereupon the Master gave a shout.

== Death poems ==
The Rinzai school continued the practice of the katsu, as can be seen through the examples of the death poems of certain Rinzai priests:

Katsu!
On the death bed—Katsu!
Let he who has eyes see!
Katsu! Katsu! Katsu!
And once again, Katsu!
Katsu!
-–Yōsō Sōi (養叟宗頤, 1379–1458)

For over sixty years
I often cried Katsu! to no avail.
And now, while dying,
Once more to cry Katsu!
Won't change a thing.
—Kokei Sōchin (古溪宗陳, 1515–1597)

== See also ==
- Eureka (word) – interjection used in the West to express sudden insight into a problem

== Sources ==
- Dōgen. Dogen's Pure Standards for the Zen Community: A Translation of the Eihei Shingi. Tr. Taigen Daniel Leighton and Shohaku Okumura. Albany: State University of New York Press, 1996. ISBN 0-7914-2710-2.
- Dumoulin, Heinrich. Zen Buddhism: A History. Volume 1: India and China. Tr. Heisig, James W. and Knitter, Paul. Bloomington, Indiana: World Wisdom, 2005.
- —. Zen Enlightenment: Origins and Meaning. Weatherhill Publishers, 1979. ISBN 0-8348-0141-8.
- Hoffmann, Yoel; ed. and tr. Japanese Death Poems: Written by Zen Monks and Haiku Poets on the Verge of Death. Singapore: Charles E. Tuttle Company, Inc., 1986. ISBN 0-8048-1505-4.
- Lievens, Bavo (1981), Ma-tsu. De gesprekken, Bussum: Het Wereldvenster
- Payne, Richard K.; ed. Discourse and Ideology in Medieval Japanese Buddhism. New York: Routledge, 2006. ISBN 0-415-35917-1.
- Schloegel, Irmgard (1979), Zen leer van Rinzai, Katwijk: Servire
- Thanissaro Bhikkhu; tr. Magga-vibhanga Sutta: An Analysis of the Path, 1996. Retrieved 17 October 2006.
- Watson, Burton; tr. The Zen Teachings of Master Lin-Chi: A Translation of the Lin-chi lu. New York: Columbia University Press, 1999. ISBN 0-231-11485-0.
