= Layman Pang =

Tang dynasty Chan Buddhist

Layman Pang (Chinese 龐居士 Páng Jūshì; Japanese Hōkoji) (740–808) was a celebrated lay Buddhist in the Chinese Chan (Zen) tradition. Much like Vimalakīrti, Layman Pang is considered to exemplify the potential for non-monastic Buddhist followers to live an exemplary life and to be fully awakened.

== Biography ==
Pang is his family name, and Jushi is the title in Chinese for the Sanskrit Upasaka (a non-ordained follower of the Buddha). His rarely used personal name is 蘊 Yùn, so his full name would be 龐蘊居士 Páng Yùn Jūshì but is almost never used.

Originally from Hengyang in the southern Chinese province of Hunan, Pang was a successful merchant with a wife, son, and daughter. The family's wealth allowed them to devote their time to study of the Buddhist sūtras, in which they all became well-versed. Pang's daughter Ling Zhao was particularly adept, and at one point even seems to have been more advanced and wise than her father, as the following story illustrates:

The Layman was sitting in his thatched cottage one day [studying the sūtras]. "Difficult, difficult," he said; "like trying to scatter ten measures of sesame seed all over a tree." "Easy, easy," Mrs. Pang said; "like touching your feet to the ground when you get out of bed." "Neither difficult nor easy," Ling Zhao said; "on the hundred grass tips, the great Masters' meaning."

After Pang had retired from his profession, he is said to have begun to worry about the spiritual dangers of his material wealth, and so he placed all of his possessions in a boat which he then sunk in a river.

Following this, the family began to lead an itinerant lifestyle, travelling around China and visiting various Buddhist masters while earning a living by making and selling bamboo utensils. It was during this period, beginning around the year 785, that Pang began to study under one of the two preeminent Chan masters of the time, Shitou Xiqian, at Nanyue Mountain, one of China's sacred mountains. Upon arriving at the mountain, Pang went directly to Shitou and asked, "Who is the one who is not a companion to the ten thousand dharmas?" At this question, Shitou placed his hand over Pang's mouth. This gesture made a deep impression on Pang and his understanding of Buddhism, and he thereafter spent several months at Nanyue.

It was sometime during this period that Shitou asked Pang what he had been doing lately, and Pang responded with a verse whose last two lines are well known in Chinese Buddhist literature:

How miraculous and wondrous,
Hauling water and carrying firewood!

Pang eventually moved on from Nanyue to Jiangxi province, and his next teacher was the second preeminent Chan master of the time, Mazu Daoyi (馬祖道一). Pang approached Mazu with the same question that he had initially asked Shitou: "Who is the one who is not a companion to the ten thousand dharmas?" Mazu's answer was: "I'll tell you after you've swallowed West River in one gulp." With this response, Pang was enlightened. For this occasion—generally considered among the most important events in a Buddhist practitioner's spiritual life—Pang composed a poem:

[People of] the ten directions are the same one assembly—

Each and every one learns wu wei.
This is the very place to select Buddha;

Empty-minded having passed the exam, I return.

After staying with Mazu for a time to solidify his initial enlightenment experience, Pang then resumed his itinerant lifestyle, travelling with his family and stopping at various Buddhist temples and monasteries in his travels. One encounter that occurred in Guangxi province during this period of travel later became the basis for one of the gong'an in the collection Blue Cliff Record (碧巖錄 Bìyán Lù):

When Layman Pang took leave of Yao Mountain, Shan ordered ten Chan travellers to escort him to the gate. The Layman pointed to the snow in the air and said, "Good snow -- flake by flake doesn't fall in any other place." At the time one of the Chan travellers named Chuan said, "Where do they fall?" The Layman slapped him once. Chuan said, "Even a layman shouldn't be so coarse." The Layman said, "Though you call yourself a Chan traveller this way, the King of Death still won't let you go." Chuan said, "How about you, Layman?" Again the Layman slapped him and said, "Your eyes see like a blind man, your mouth speaks like a mute."

In 808, after many years of travel that had made him renowned in southern China, Pang became ill in Xiangzhou county of Guangxi province. His last words were spoken to the governor of Xiangzhou, who had come to inquire about his health: "I ask that you regard everything that is as empty, nor give substance to that which has none. Farewell. The world is like reflections and echoes."

== Sources ==
- Sasaki, Ruth Fuller, Iriya, Yoshitaka, and Fraser, Dana R. 1971. The Recorded Sayings of Layman P'ang: A Ninth-Century Zen Classic. Tokyo: Weatherhill.
- Cleary, Thomas. tr. 1977. The Blue Cliff Record. Boston: Shambhala.
- Dumoulin, Heinrich. 2005. Zen Buddhism: A History. Volume 1: India and China. Tr. Heisig, James W. and Knitter, Paul. Bloomington, Indiana: World Wisdom.
- Ferguson, Andrew. 2000. Zen's Chinese Heritage: The Masters and their Teachings. Somerville, Massachusetts: Wisdom Publications,.
- Green, James Reid. 2009. The Sayings of Layman P’ang: A Zen Classic of China. Boston: Shambhala.
- Mitchell, Stephen, ed. 1989. The Enlightened Heart: An Anthology of Sacred Poetry. New York: Harper Perennial.
- Xū Yún. 1996. Empty Cloud: The teachings of Xu Yun and a remembrance of the Great Chinese Zen Master. Ed. Sakya, Jy Din; Shakya, Chuan Yuan; and Cheung, Upasaka Richard. H.K. Buddhist Book Distributor.
