= Baizhang Huaihai =

Chinese Buddhist monk (720–814)

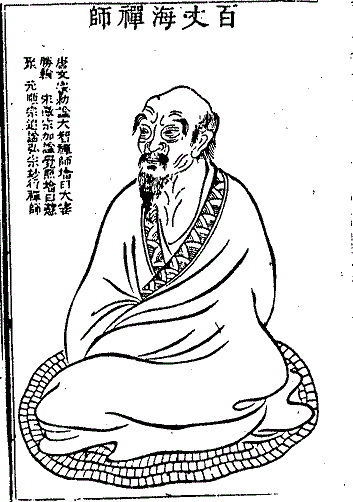
Baizhang

Baizhang Huaihai (Chinese: 百丈懷海; pinyin: Bǎizhàng Huáihái; Wade-Giles: Pai-chang Huai-hai; Japanese: Hyakujō Ekai) (720–814) was a Chan/Zen master during the Tang dynasty. A native of Fuzhou, he was a dharma heir of Mazu Daoyi (Wade-Giles: Ma-tsu Tao-i). Baizhang's students included Huangbo, Linji and Puhua.

== Teaching ==
Hagiographic depictions of Baizhang depict him as a radical and iconoclastic figure, but these narratives derive from at least a century and a half after his death and were developed and elaborated during the Song dynasty. As Mario Poceski writes, the earliest strata of sources (such as the Baizhang guanglu 百丈廣錄) about this figure provide a "divergent image of Baizhang as a sophisticated teacher of doctrine, who is at ease with both the philosophical and contemplative aspects of Buddhism." Poceski summarizes this figure thus:

The image of Baizhang conveyed by the Tang-era sources is that of a learned and sagacious monk who is well versed in both the theoretical and contemplative aspects of medieval Chinese Buddhism. Here we encounter Baizhang as a teacher of a particular Chan brand of Buddhist doctrine, formulated in a manner and idiom that are unique to him and to the Hongzhou school as a whole. Nonetheless, he also comes across as someone who is cognizant of major intellectual trends in Tang Buddhism, as well as deeply steeped in canonical texts and traditions. His discourses are filled with scriptural quotations and allusions. He also often resorts to technical Buddhist vocabulary, of the kind one usually finds in the texts of philosophically oriented schools of Chinese Buddhism such as Huayan, Faxiang, and Tiantai. Here the primary mode in which Baizhang communicates his teachings is the public Chan sermon, presented in the ritual framework of “ascending the [Dharma] hall [to preach]” (shangtang).

Regarding his teachings, Poceski notes :

A central idea that infuses most of Baizhang’s sermons is the ineffability or indescribability of reality. Ultimate reality cannot be predicated in terms of conventional conceptual categories, as it transcends the familiar realm of words and ideas. Nonetheless, it can be approached or realized—as it truly is, without any accretions or distortions—as it manifests at all times and in all places. That is done by means of intuitive knowledge, whose cultivation is one of the cornerstones of Chan soteriology. Since the essence of reality cannot be captured or conveyed via the mediums of words and letters, according to Baizhang it is pointless to get stuck in dogmatic assertions, or to attach to a particular doctrine or practice. Like everything else, the various Chan (or more broadly Buddhist) teachings are empty of self-nature. They simply constitute expedient tools in an ongoing process of cultivating detachment and transcendence that supposedly free the mind of mistaken views and distorted ways of perceiving reality; to put it differently, they belong to the well-known Buddhist category of “skillful means” (fangbian, or upāya in Sanskrit). Holding on rigidly or fetishizing a particular text, viewpoint, or method of practice—even the most profound and potent ones—can turn out to be counterproductive, as it becomes a source of attachment that impedes spiritual progress. The perfection of the Chan path of practice and realization, therefore, does not involve the attainment of some particular ability or knowledge. Rather, in Baizhang’s text it is depicted as a process of letting go of all views and attachment that interfere with the innate human ability to know reality and experience spiritual freedom.

One of his doctrinal innovations is what are called the “three propositions” (sanju), which are three distinct stages of spiritual realization or progressive ways of knowing:

- Thoroughgoing detachment from all things and affairs
- Nonabiding in the state of detachment
- Letting go of even the subtlest vestiges of self-referential awareness or knowledge of having transcended detachment.

Baizhang's teachings and sayings have been translated by Thomas Cleary in Sayings and Doings of Pai-Chang. Baizhang also features in the Wild fox koan.

== Monasticism ==
Baizhang is also given a particularly unique role in that he is also seen as the creator of a new pattern of Chan monastic life, and thus developing the first truly independent Chan monastery. This Chan monasticism included periods of work and farming, something which was traditionally not acceptable in Buddhist monasticism, but which allowed the Chan communities to be self-sufficient. However, Poceski notes that "on closer inspection Baizhang's assumed innovations turn out not to be revolutionary or unique to the Chan school."

According to traditional Chan/Zen accounts, Baizhang established an early set of rules for Chan (Chinese Zen) monastic discipline, the Pure Rules of Baizhang (Chinese: 百丈清規; pinyin: Bǎizhàng qīngguī; Wade–Giles: Pai-chang ch'ing-kuei; Korean: 백장청규) It was practiced in Ta-chih shou-sheng ch'an-ssu (Jp. Daichijusho-zenji), founded by Baizhang. This monastery contained a monks hall, an innovation which became typical for Chán:

During periods of ascetic practice the monks would sleep on the same straw mat on which they sat in meditation and on which, according to defined ritual, they took their meals. Both the lifestyle Pai-chang spelled out as well as the architectural form of his monastery became models for later Zen monasteries".

Some believe these rules developed much later in Chan history, and are agreed by the monks Taixu and Hsu Yun.

As the Zen monks farmed, it helped them to survive the Great Anti-Buddhist Persecution. These rules are still used today in many Zen monasteries. From this text comes Baizhang's well-known saying "a day without work is a day without food" (Chinese: 一日不做一日不食; pinyin: yīrì bù zuò yīrì bù shí; lit. 'One day not work, one day not eat').

== See also ==
- Buddhism in China
- Index of Buddhism-related articles
- Schools of Buddhism
- Secular Buddhism

== Sources ==
- Dumoulin, Heinrich (2005). Zen Buddhism: India and China. World Wisdom, Inc. ISBN 978-0-941532-89-1.
- Heine, Steven; Wright, Dale (2010). Zen Masters. New York: Oxford University Press. ISBN 978-0-19-979885-8.
- Ichimura, Shōhei (2006). "The Baizhang Zen monastic regulations", Berkeley, Calif: Numata Center for Buddhist Translation and Research, ISBN 1-886439-25-7.

Buddhist titles
Preceded by Mazu Daoyi	Linji Chan/Rinzai Zen patriarch	Succeeded by Huangbo Xiyun
