= Zhaozhou Congshen =

Chinese Chan Buddhist monk (778–897)

Zhàozhōu Cōngshěn
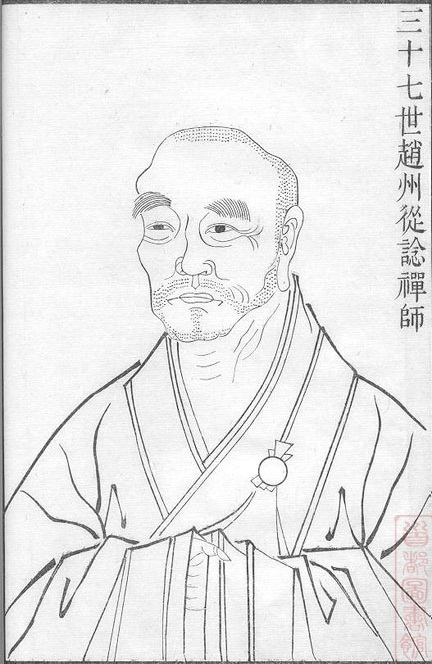
- Woodcut from Fozu zhengzong daoying (1880)
- Title: Ch'an-shih

Personal life
- Born: 778 China
- Died: 897 (aged 118–119)

Religious life
- Religion: Buddhism
- School: Ch'an

Zhaozhou Congshen

Chinese name
- Chinese: 趙州從諗
Transcriptions
Standard Mandarin
- Hanyu Pinyin: Zhàozhōu Cōngshěn
Wu
- Suzhounese: Zau6tseu1 Tshon1sen3
Yue: Cantonese
- Jyutping: Ziu6zau1 Cung1sam2

Vietnamese name
- Vietnamese alphabet: Triệu Châu Tùng Thẩm
- Hán-Nôm: 趙州從諗

Korean name
- Hangul: 조주종심
- Hanja: 趙州從諗

Japanese name
- Kanji: 趙州従諗
Transcriptions
- Romanization: Jōshū Jūshin

Zhaozhou Congshen (Chinese: 趙州從諗; pinyin: Zhàozhōu Cōngshěn; Wade–Giles: Chao-chou Ts'ung-shen'; Japanese: 趙州従諗, romanized: Jōshū Jūshin; 778–897) was a Chan (Zen) Buddhist master who appears frequently in the koans of the Wumenguan and the Blue Cliff Record.

== Biography ==
Zhaozhou became ordained as a monk at an early age. At the age of 18, he met Nanquan Puyuan (南泉普願 748–835; J: Nansen Fugan), a successor of Mazu Daoyi (709–788; J. Baso Do-itsu), and eventually received the Dharma from him. Zhaozhou continued to practice under Nanquan until the latter's death.

Subsequently, Zhaozhou began to travel throughout China, visiting the prominent Chan masters of the time before finally, at the age of eighty, settling in Guanyinyuan (觀音院), a ruined temple in northern China. There, for the next forty years, he taught a small group of monks. This temple, now called Bailin Temple, was rebuilt after the Cultural Revolution and is nowadays again a prominent center of Chinese Buddhism.

== Influence ==
Zhaozhou is sometimes touted as the greatest Chan master of Tang dynasty China during a time when its hegemony was disintegrating as more and more regional military governors (jiédùshǐ) began to assert their power. Zhaozhou's lineage died out quickly due to the many wars and frequent purges of Buddhism in China at the time, and cannot be documented beyond the year 1000.

Zhaozhou is remembered for his verbal inventiveness and sense of humor. One of his recorded sayings is:

A monk asked the Master, "What is a true statement?" Zhaozhou replied, "Your mother is ugly."

Many koans in both the Blue Cliff Record and The Gateless Gate concern Zhaozhou, with twelve cases in the former and five in the latter being attributed to him. Wumenguan case (koan) 19 records a dialogue between Nanquan and Zhaozhou, with Jōshū asking Nansen "What is the Way [Tao]?", to which Nansen responds ordinary mind is the way, (Note: See Ed Shozen Haber, Mumonkan Case 19, and Barry Magid, Ordinary Mind is the Way.) a famous dictum of Mazu Daoyi (709–788) and the Hongzhou school. He is probably best known for the first koan in The Gateless Gate:

A monk asked Chao-chou, "Has the dog Buddha-nature or not?" Chao-chou said, "Wu."

Japanese Zen monk Shunryū Suzuki refers to Zhaozhou (as Jōshū) in his book Zen Mind, Beginner's Mind. He uses the following saying from Zhaozhou to illustrate the point that Zen practice should not have a particular purpose or goal: "A clay Buddha cannot cross water; a bronze Buddha cannot get through a furnace; a wooden Buddha cannot get through fire".

== Sources ==
- Dumoulin, Heinrich (2005). Zen Buddhism: A History. Volume 1: India and China. Translated by Heisig, James W.; Knitter, Paul. Bloomington, Indiana: World Wisdom.
- Green, James, ed. (1988). The Recorded Sayings of Zen Master Joshu. Boston: Shambhala Publications. ISBN 1-57062-870-X.
- Sullivan, Matthew Juksan (2021). The Garden of Flowers and Weeds: A New Translation and Commentary on the Blue Cliff Record. Rhinebeck, N.Y.: Monkfish Book Publishing Company. ISBN 9781948626491.
- Suzuki, Shunryu (1973). Dixon, Trudy (ed.). Zen mind, beginner's mind. New York: Weatherhill.
- Zhu, Caifang (2003), Buddhism in China Today: The Example of the Bai Lin Chan Monastery. In: Perspectives, Volume 4, No.2, June 2003 (PDF), archived from the original on 2010-09-29
