= Nanyue Huairang =

Nányuè Huáiràng
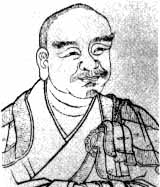
- Title: Ch'an master

Personal life
- Born: May 14, 677 Jinzhou, China
- Died: July 21, 744 (aged 67) China

Religious life
- Religion: Buddhism
- School: Ch'an

Senior posting
- Teacher: Dajian Huineng
- Successor: Mazu Daoyi

Nanyue Huairang (Chinese: 南嶽懐譲; pinyin: Nányuè Huáiràng; Rōmaji: Nangaku Ejõ) (677–744) was a Chinese Chan master. According to the Chan-tradition, he was the foremost student of Dajian Huineng, the 6th Patriarch of Chan (Zen) and teacher of one of his Dharma heirs, Mazu Daoyi.

== Life ==
The ancestor of two of the Five Houses of Ch'an, Huairang is traditionally said to have studied with a Vinaya master and became ordained. Dissatisfied with his own progress, Huairang found Dajian Huineng in Shaozhou and became his disciple, which is recorded in various traditional biographies. Huairang is traditionally said to have given Dharma transmission to six individuals, the most prominent being Mazu Daoyi.

Based on a critical reading of the textual evidence, the scholar John McRae notes that it is unlikely that Huairang actually practiced with Huineng. In the oldest version of the Platform Sutra found among the Dunhuang manuscripts, which dates to about 850 CE, Nanyue is not listed as a student of Huineng at all. Although Huairang is mentioned in 952 CE in the Anthology of the Patriarchal Hall, he is not discussed in the context of Huineng. The same source records a putative conversation between him and Mazu, but there is no explicit suggestion that Mazu is his student. An even earlier source, the Transmissions of the Treasure Grove of 801, states that Huairang was enlightened under Lao'an, a teacher with connections to Shenxiu of the so-called Northern School.

Buddhist titles
Preceded by Dajian Huineng	Linji Chan/Rinzai Zen patriarch	Succeeded by Mazu Daoyi
