= The Jingde Record of the Transmission of the Lamp =

Chan and Zen Buddhist biographies

The Transmission of the Lamp

The Record of the Transmission of the Lamp (traditional Chinese: 景德傳燈錄; simplified Chinese: 景德传灯录; pinyin: Jǐngdé Chuándēng lù; Wade–Giles: Ching-te Ch'uan teng lu; Japanese: Keitoku Dentō-roku), often referred to as The Transmission of the Lamp, is a 30 fascicle work consisting of putative biographies of the Chan Buddhist patriarchs and other prominent Buddhist monks. It was produced in the Song dynasty by Shi Daoyuan (simplified Chinese: 释道原; traditional Chinese: 釋道原; pinyin: Shì Dàoyuán; Wade–Giles: Shih Tao-Yüen). Alongside the other early surviving Chan lineage record, the Anthology of the Patriarchal Hall, it represents the first appearance of "encounter dialogues" in the Chan tradition, many of which would be developed into the famous kōan (Chinese: gōng'àn 公案) stories.

The word Jingde (景德), the first two characters of the title, refers to the reign name of Emperor Zhenzong of Song, which dates the work to between 1004 and 1007 CE. It is a primary source of information for the history of Chan Buddhism in China, although most scholars interpret the biographies as largely hagiography. The "Lamp" in the title refers to the "Dharma", the teachings of the Buddhism.

In addition to The Jingde Record of the Transmission of the Lamp, four additional lamp records compiled during the Song Dynasty are known:

1. Tiansheng Broad Record of the Lamp (Tiansheng Guangdeng Lu, 天聖廣燈錄), compiled by Li Zunxu in 1063 CE.
2. Jianzhong Jingguo Continued Record of the Lamp (Jianzhong Jingguo Xudeng Lu, 建中靖國續燈錄), compiled by Weibai in 1101 CE.
3. Essentials of the Combined Lamps (Liandeng Huiyao, 聯燈會要), compiled by Wuming Jiatai in 1183.
4. Record of the Universal Lamp (Jiatai Pudeng Lu, 嘉泰普燈錄), compiled by Zhengshou in 1204.

In 1252 CE, the Southern Song dynasty monk Puji (普濟) compiled all five classic records into a single, unified 20-fasicle text known as the Compendium of the Five Lamps (Wudeng Huiyuan, 五燈會元).

== Organization ==
The first three books trace the lineage of Chinese Buddhism back to India. The lineage starts with the Seven Buddhas, culminating in the historical Shakyamuni Buddha. From there, the lineage continues through Twenty-Eight Indian Patriarchs, culminating in Bodhidharma. Bodhidharma connects the Indian and Chinese lines, becoming the first Patriarch of Chan. He continues with five recognized successors of his lineage: Huike, Sengcan, Daoxin, Hongren, and Huineng.

From there, the lineage branches into several figures, eventually including those that would be classified under the Five Houses of Chan. One branch, starting from Nanyue Huairang and his student Mazu, would lead to the formation of the Guiyang and Linji schools. Another branch, through Qingyuan Xingsi and his student Shitou Xiquan, would lead to formation of the Caodong, Yunmen, and Fayan schools.

The final four books contain additional materials. Book 27 describes biographies of ten figures from outside the Chan genealogy. Book 28 through 30 contain additional extended teachings, verses and poems, and individually titled works on mind and practice.

== Contents ==
Note: The complete English translation by Randolph Whitfield, The Records of the Transmission of the Lamp, contains all 30 books divided into 8 volumes.

Volume 1: The Buddhas and Indian Patriarchs

- Book 1: Biographies of The Seven Buddhas, ending with Śākyamuni, as well as the first fourteen Indian patriarchs, from Mahākāśyapa through Nāgārjuna.
- Book 2: Further Biographies of Indian patriarchs fifteen through twenty-seven, from Kāṇadeva to Prajñātāra.
- Book 3: Biographies of the first five patriarchs of Chan: Bodhidharma, Huike, Sengcan, Daoxin, and Hongren.

Volume 2: The Early Masters

- Book 4: Branches associated with Daoxin and Hongren, including Farong and the Oxhead lineage, Shenxiu and Northern Chan, and the Baotang teacher Wuzhu.
- Book 5: Biography of Huineng, the sixth patriarch of Chan, and the records of his students, including Qingyuan Xingsi, Nanyue Huairang, Yongjia Xuanjue, National Teacher Huizhong, and Shenhui.
- Book 6: Mazu Daoyi and the first group of his heirs, including Dazhu Huihai and Baizhang Huaihai. Baizhang’s record is followed by an account of Chan monastic regulations.
- Book 7: More of Mazu’s direct heirs, including Xitang Zhizang, Magu Baoche, and Damei Fachang.
- Book 8: More figures in Mazu’s circle, including Wuye, Nanquan, and Layman Pang.
- Book 9: Guishan and Huangbo, both heirs of Baizhang, alongside other teachers. Their lines lead into the Guiyang and Linji traditions developed in the next volume.

Volume 3: The Nanyue Huairang Lineage

- Book 10: Nanquan’s heirs, especially Changsha Jingcen and Zhaozhou Congshen, followed by other branches descending from Mazu’s circle.
- Book 11: Guishan’s heirs Yangshan, Xiangyan, and Lingyun, followed by several other lines.
- Book 12: Huangbo’s heirs, beginning with the notable Linji and including the lay official Pei Xiu. It also follows descendants of Yangshan, Linji, and other teachers.
- Book 13: Later Linji-line figures including Fengxue, Shoushan, and Fenyang, alongside records in the lines of Huizhong and Shenhui. The book closes with Zongmi.

Volume 4: The Shitou Line

- Book 14: Shitou Xiqian and his heirs, including Danxia and Yaoshan, followed by figures such as Longtan, Yunyan, and the Boatman Decheng.
- Book 15: Deshan Xuanjian, Dongshan Liangjie, Jiashan, and related teachers.
- Book 16: Deshan’s heirs Yantou and Xuefeng, followed by descendants of Shishuang and Jiashan.
- Book 17: Dongshan’s heirs, especially Yunju Daoying and Caoshan Benji, followed by Yantou’s heirs and other branches.

Volume 5: Heirs of Master Xuefeng Yicun et al.

- Book 18: The first group of Xuefeng Yicun’s heirs, beginning with Xuansha Shibei and Changqing Huileng.
- Book 19: The second group of Xuefeng’s heirs, including Yunmen Wenyan.
- Book 20: Heirs of Yunju, Caoshan, Longya, and other teachers in the Dongshan line.
- Book 21: Heirs of Xuansha, Changqing, and several other students of Xuefeng.

Volume 6: Heirs of Tiantai Deshao, Congzhan, Yunmen et al.

- Book 22: Descendants of several Xuefeng heirs, including Lingzhao and Cuiyan Lingcan, followed by part of Yunmen’s succession.
- Book 23: More of Yunmen’s heirs, including the later teacher Dongshan Shouchu.
- Book 24: Luohan Guichen’s heirs, including the notable Fayan Wenyi, and teachers from several other lines.
- Book 25: Fayan’s heirs, including Tiantai Deshao and Fadeng Taiqin.
- Book 26: Further Fayan heirs and later generations, including Deshao’s successor Yongming Yanshou. It also includes the Caodong teacher Dayang Jingxuan.

Volume 7: Biographies and Extended Discourses

- Book 27: Ten figures outside the main succession, including Baozhi, the lay teacher Fu Dashi, the Tiantai masters Huisi and Zhiyi, and the figures associated with Hanshan, Shide, and Budai. It also includes seventy-four kōan cases.
- Book 28: Twelve extended teaching records from various Chan figures such as Huizhong, Shenhui, Mazu, and Yaoshan.

Volume 8: Chan Poetry and Inscriptions

- Book 29: Seventeen groups of verses, hymns, and poems. Includes practice verses by Xiangyan and Dongshan, as well as poems by Baozhi, Fayan, and Bai Juyi.
- Book 30: Inscriptions, treatises, admonitions, and songs. These include the Xinxin ming attributed to Sengcan, the Xin ming attributed to Farong, and the Two Entrances and Four Practices attributed to Bodhidharma.

== Encounter Dialogues ==
In addition to providing detailed genealogies of Chan Buddhist masters, the Jingde Record of the Transmission of the Lamp contains numerous examples of what modern schoolers call encounter dialogues.

These dialogues typically have the following format: A student asks a question about Buddhist teaching or practice. Then, the teacher responds, often with either with some paradoxical or seemingly irrelevant answer, or with some nonverbal gesture (such as raising a finger, a shout, or a blow with a stick). In many of these stories, the student achieves enlightenment as a result of the teacher's unconventional answer.

Several notable examples are:

Mazu Dayoi polishing a tile

In the Kaiyuan reign period (713-41 CE) there was a Śramaņa named Daoyi who was living in the Quanfa Temple and forever practising meditation. Master Huairang knew that he was a vessel of the Dharma, so he went to him and asked, ‘What is the venerable one after in sitting meditation?’ ‘The desire to become a Buddha,’ was the reply. The master then took a tile and right there in front of the hermitage, began grinding it on a stone. ‘What is the master doing?’ asked the Śramaņa Daoyi. ‘Grinding it down to make a mirror,’ answered Master Huairang. ‘How is it possible to make a mirror by grinding down a tile?’ asked Daoyi. ‘How is it possible to make a Buddha from sitting in meditation?’ countered the master. (Volume 2, Book 5, entry 5.84).

Nanquan and the cat

Due to a dispute concerning a cat, between [the monks of] the eastern hall and the western hall, the master went over and said to them, ‘If there is a word forth-coming it will save the cat, if there is no word forthcoming then chop!’ There was no response from the assembly so the master killed the cat. Zhaozhou was returning from outside and the master related what had happened. Zhaozhou then took off his footwear, placed it on his head and made to leave. ‘Had you been there at that moment it would have saved the cat,’ said the master. (Volume 2, Book 8, entry 8.126).

Zhaozhou tells a monk to wash his bowls

‘What is Buddha?’ asked the monk. ‘The one in the temple,’ replied the master. ‘The student is confused and ignorant and begs the master for a pointer,’ said the monk. ‘Eaten your rice gruel yet?’ asked the master. ‘Yes,’ replied the monk. ‘Then go and wash your bowls,’ said the master. The monk was suddenly awoken. (Volume 3, Book 10, entry 10.195).

Longtan blows out Deshan’s lantern

When the time came for the master to take his leave, Longtan detained him. As night fell all was black outside the room. Then Longtan said, ‘Why not go home now?’ ‘It is pitch-black,’ replied the master. Longtan then lit a lantern and gave it to him. The master was about to take it when Longtan blew it out. The master bowed. ‘What have you seen?’ asked Longtan. ‘From now on there will be no doubts about the tongue of the old monk,’ said the master. (Volume 4, Book 15, entry 15.359).

Dongshan’s three pounds of flax

A monk asked Dongshan [Liangjie, 15.370], ‘What is Buddha?’ Dongshan had answered, ‘Three pounds of flax.’ The master heard about this and said, ‘Bamboos in the south, trees in the north.’ (Volume 6, entry 22.705).

Encounter dialogues would go on to become one of Chan's most unique literary tools. Many of these dialogues, including the ones above, would later be included as kōan (Chinese: gōng'àn 公案) cases in collections such as the Gateless Barrier, The Blue Cliff Record, and the Book of Equanimity. These stories would also make their way to Japan and Korea, appearing in kōan collections such as Dogen's Shinji Shōbōgenzō and the Korean Seonmun yeomsong jip. (Note: The tile-polishing story appears in Dōgen’s Three Hundred Kōans (case 8). The story of Nanquan and the cat appears in The Gateless Barrier (case 14), The Blue Cliff Record (case 63/64), The Book of Serenity (case 9), and Dōgen’s Three Hundred Kōans (case 181). The bowl-washing story appears in The Gateless Barrier (case 7), The Book of Serenity (case 39), and Dōgen’s Three Hundred Kōans (case 67). The story of Deshan's lantern appears in The Gateless Barrier (case 28), and in the commentary to case 4 in The Blue Cliff Record. Finally, Dongshan's "Three Pounds of Flax" is found in The Gateless Barrier (case 18). The Blue Cliff Record (case 12), Dōgen’s Three Hundred Kōans (case 172), Entangling Vines (case 62), and Empty Valley Collection (case 88).)

At first glance, these answers by teachers may seem nonsensical. However, as McRae points out, the point of many of these stories is to shake a student out of their rigid, habitual way of thinking and give them a chance to see for themselves what their question takes for granted. While Chan Buddhism is not "anti-text", it develops a unique brand of being a "transmission beyond the scriptures"; as such, stories like these point to the idea that the teachings of Chan cannot fully be captured by language.

McRae points out these stories often involve early Chan masters from the 8th century. However, these specific types of dialogues do not appear in written form until collections such as the Anthology of the Patriarchal Hall (952) and The Jingde Record of the Transmission of the Lamp (1004-07), hundreds of years later. As such, McRae argues these should not be taken as literal transcripts of what early Chan masters actually said; rather, they should be understood as a unique style of literary Chan designed to show how Buddhist masters transmit teachings in non-conceptual ways that defy language.

== List of the Patriarchs of Chan ==
=== The Seven Buddhas ===
1. Vipashin
2. Shikhin
3. Vishvabhu
4. Kakusandha
5. Kanakamuni
6. Kāśyāpa
7. Shakyamuni

=== The Twenty-Eight Indian Patriarchs ===
1. Mahakāśyapa
2. Ānanda
3. Sanakavāsa
4. Upagupta
5. Dhritaka
6. Michaka
7. Vasumitra
8. Buddhanandi
9. Buddhamitra
10. Parsva
11. Punyayasas
12. Aśvaghoṣa
13. Kapimala
14. Nāgārjuna
15. Kanadeva
16. Rahulata
17. Sanghanandi
18. Gayasata
19. Kumorata
20. Jāyatā
21. Vasubandhu
22. Manorhita
23. Haklena
24. Āryasimha
25. Bashyashita
26. Punyamitra
27. Prajñātara
28. Bodhidharma

=== The Six Chinese Patriarchs ===
1. Bodhidharma
2. Huike
3. Sengcan
4. Daoxin
5. Hongren
6. Huineng

=== Notable Students of Huineng ===
- Heze Shenhui (荷澤神會), who championed "sudden awakening" (dunwu) and publicly campaigned to have Huineng recognized as the rightful Sixth Patriarch, although leaving few successors of his own.
- Qingyuan Xingsi (青原行思), teacher of Shitou Xiqian. One of the two major Chan lineage branches, eventually resulting in the formation of Caodong, Yunmen, and Fayan schools.
- Nanyue Huairang (南嶽懷讓), teacher of Mazu Daoyi. One of the two major Chan lineage branches, eventually resulting in the formation of the Linji and Guiyang schools.
- Nanyang Huizhong (南陽慧忠), who became a National Teacher at the Tang court.
- Yongjia Xuanjue (永嘉玄覺), credited with writing the Song of Enlightenment.
