= Xuefeng Yicun =

Chinese Chan-master

Xuefeng Yicun 雪峰 义 存
- Title: purple robe and the title of Grand Master of the True Enlightenment

Personal life
- Born: 822 CE; Nanan district of Quanzhou (today's prow. Fujian)
- Died: 908 CE monastery atop Guangfu Xuefeng (Snow Summit) Top Xianggu (Elephant Tusk)

Religious life
- Religion: Buddhism
- School: Tang dynasty Ch'an, Southern School of sudden enlightenment

Senior posting
- Teacher: Deshan Xuanjian
- Successor: Xuansha Shibei; Yunmen Wenyan; Baofu Congzhan

Xuefeng Yicun (822–908; Chinese: 雪峰义存; Wade–Giles: Hsüeh-feng I-ts'un; pinyin: Xuěfēng Yìcún; Seppō Gizon) was a Chinese Chan-master who was influential during the Tang dynasty. The Yunmen school and Fayan school originated with descendants of his lineage.

== Biography ==
According to the Wudeng Huiyuan ("Compendium of Five Lamps") Xuefeng Yicun was born in 822 in Nanan in ancient the district Quanzhou (now the province of Fujian). At age twelve he left home to live at Yujian Temple in Putian City.

During the suppression of Buddhism (841–846) by Emperor Xuanzong Xuefeng Yicun was forced to leave the monastery. He continued his apprenticeship with a master Yuanzhao (Changzhao) on top of Furong (Lotus) Mountain in Hunan.

When Emperor Xuanzong allowed for the restoration of Buddhism Xuefeng started hiking in the different regions of northern China. He received the full ordination of monks in 850 in the Baocha monastery in Youzhou (now Beijing) in the Hebei province.

Later he went to Wuling (near the modern city of Changde in Hunan province), and became a student and dharma heir of Deshan Xuanjian (782–865).

After his awakening Xuefeng returned to his former monastery on top of the Lotus Mountain, and then built a monastery on the top of Guangfu Xuefeng (Snow Summit) Top Xianggu (Elephant Bone). During the qianfu era (874–878) the monastery was officially recognized by the authorities. His teachings were supported by several officials in the Min region. As a result of his growing fame, Xuefeng was summoned to the court by palace officials. Xuefeng was awarded a purple robe and the title of "Grand Master of the truly enlightened" (zhenjue dashi) (or Grand Master of the True Enlightenment) by Emperor Xizong.

In 891 Xuefeng went to travel again. In 892 he had joined the attendants of Yang Xingmi, the ruler of the newly established Wu (Jiangshi) regime, "cleansing soldiers with dharma-rain and performing ceremonies at Chan monasteries". This strengthened his reputation "as a Buddhist prelate who administered to the needs of local rulers". In 894 he returned to the Min region, where he was supported by Wang Xu (r.891–897). Wang Xu was followed by his brother Wang Shenzhi (r.897–925), under whose reign Buddhism became established in the Min region. Xuefeng had become a state prelate, who had a central role in promoting Buddhism, and who had to spread his influence throughout the entire region.

== Teachings ==
The Runei lun fo xinjin lu ("Record of Discussions in the Palace regarding the Buddha Mind-seal") records his conversations with Wang Shenzhi. It is "highly reminiscent of earlied Chan precedents, particularly Bodhidharma's renunciation of the Liang emperor Wu recorded in the Platform sutra. The records seem to be modelled according to the examples of Bodhidharma and Huineng.

Xuefeng's Chán-style was similar to that of Mazu Daoyi. The phrase "Mind is Buddha", used by Xuefeng, was "allegedly introduced into Chan circles in the teaching attributed to Mazu Daoyi". But the same teaching is also attributed to Shitou.

== Influence and lineage ==
Xuefeng was one of the most influential Chán-teachers at the end of the Tang dynasty, when "a widely influential zen center formed around Xuefeng Yicun". The loss of control by the Tang dynasty, and the accompanying loss of support for Buddhist institutions, lead to a regionally based Chan of Xuefeng and his students.

=== Students ===
Xuefeng Yicun was the teacher of Yunmen Wenyan (862 or 864–949 CE), who established the Yunmen school. Fayan Wenyi (885–958), Xuefeng's "grand-disciple", established the Fayan school.

Xuansha Shibei (WG Hsüan-sha Shih-pei) (835–908), a student of Xuefeng Yicun, is cited by Wumen Huikai (WG Wu-men Hui-k'ai, Jpn. Mumon Ekai) in explaining the title of his famous koan-collection, the Mumonkan ("Gateless barrier"), in explaining the title of this collection:

Have you not heard what Hsüan-sha said, 'No-gate is the gate of emancipation; no-mind is the mind of the man of Tao'?

Cuiyan Lingcan was another prominent student of Xuefeng Yicun who attracted a large number of students.

=== Zutang ji ===
The Zutang ji (祖堂集 "Anthology of the Patriarchal Hall), compiled in 952, the first document which mentions Linji Yixuan, was written to support the Xuefeng Yicun lineage. It pictures this lineage as heir to the legacy of Mazu and the Hongzhou-school, though Xuefeng Yicun's lineage is traced back to Shitou Xiqian (700–790). It was written by two students of Zhaoqing Wendeng (884–972), a dharma descendant of Xuefeng Yicun.

=== Lineage chart ===
	Six Patriarchs
	Huineng (638–713) (WG: Hui-neng. Jpn: Enō)
	Qingyuan Xingsi (660–740) (WG: TCh'ing yüan Hsing-ssu. Jpn: Seigen Gyōshi)
	Shitou Xiqian (700–790) (WG: Shih-t'ou Hsi-ch'ien. Jpn: Sekitō Kisen)
	Tianhuang Daowu (748–807) (WG: T'ien-huang Tao-wu. Jpn: Tennō Dago)
	Longtan Chongxin (8th/9th century) (WG: Lung-t'an Ch'ung-hsin; Jpn: Ryūtan Sōshin)
	Deshan Xuanjian (782–865) (WG: Te-shan Hsüan-chien; Jpn: Tokusan Senkan)
0	Xuefeng Yicun (822–908)(雪峰 义 存) (WG: Hsüeh-feng I-ts'un. Jpn: Seppō Gison)
1	Jingqing Daotu (ca.863–937) (WG: Ching-ch'ing Tao-fu. Jpn: Kyōsei Dōfu)	Yunmen Wenyan (864–949) (WG: Yün-men Wen-yen. Jpn: Ummon Bun'en)
2	Xuansha Shibei (835–908)	Dongshan Shouchu (910–990)
3	Luohan Guichen (867–928)	Yunmen school
4	Fayan Wenyi (885–958)
	Fayan school

== Koan-appearances ==
Xuefeng occurs in several koans:

- The Mumonkan: koan 13;
- Blue Cliff Record: koan 5, 22, 49, 51, 66;
- The Book of Equanimity: koan 24, 33, 50, 55.

== See also ==
- Chinese Chán

== Sources ==
- Dumoulin, Heinrich (2005a), Zen Buddhism: A History. Volume 1: India and China, World Wisdom Books, ISBN 9780941532891
- Ferguson, Andy (2011) [13th century], Zen's Chinese Heritage. The Masters and their Teachings [original title: Wudeng Huiyuan (Compendium of Five Lamps)], Wisdom publications
- Jones, Charles B. (2010), "Review of Monks, Rulers and Literati: The Political Ascendancy of Chan Buddhism" (PDF), Journal of Buddhist Ethics
- McRae, John (2003), Seeing Through Zen. Encounter, Transformation, and Genealogy in Chinese Chan Buddhism, The University Press Group Ltd, ISBN 9780520237988
- Welter, Albert (2006a), Monks, Rulers, and Literati. The Political Ascendancy of Chan Buddhism, Wisdom Books
- Welter, Albert (2006b), The Formation of the Linji lu: An Examination of the Guangdeng lu/Sijia yulu and Linji Huizhao Chanshi yulu. Versions of the Linji lu in Historical Context (PDF), archived from the original (PDF) on 2013-03-16
- Wu, Jiang (2011), Enlightenment in Dispute:The Reinvention of Chan Buddhism in Seventeenth-Century China, Oxford University Press
