= Yunmen =

Yunmen may refer to:

- Yunmen Wenyan (c. 860–949), a Chan/Zen Buddhist master
- Yunmen school of Chan Buddhism, named after Yunmen Wenyan
- Yunmen, an acupuncture point on the lung meridian
- Yunmen Subdistrict (Chinese: 云门街道) of Hechuan District, Chongqing
- Yunmen Dajuan (Chinese: 雲門大卷), a legendary ritual dance from the Yellow Emperor era, see Yayue and History of Chinese dance
- Cloud Gate Dance Theater (Chinese: 雲門舞集; pinyin: Yúnmén Wǔjí), Taiwanese modern dance group
