= Linji school =

School of Chan Buddhism named after Linji Yixuan

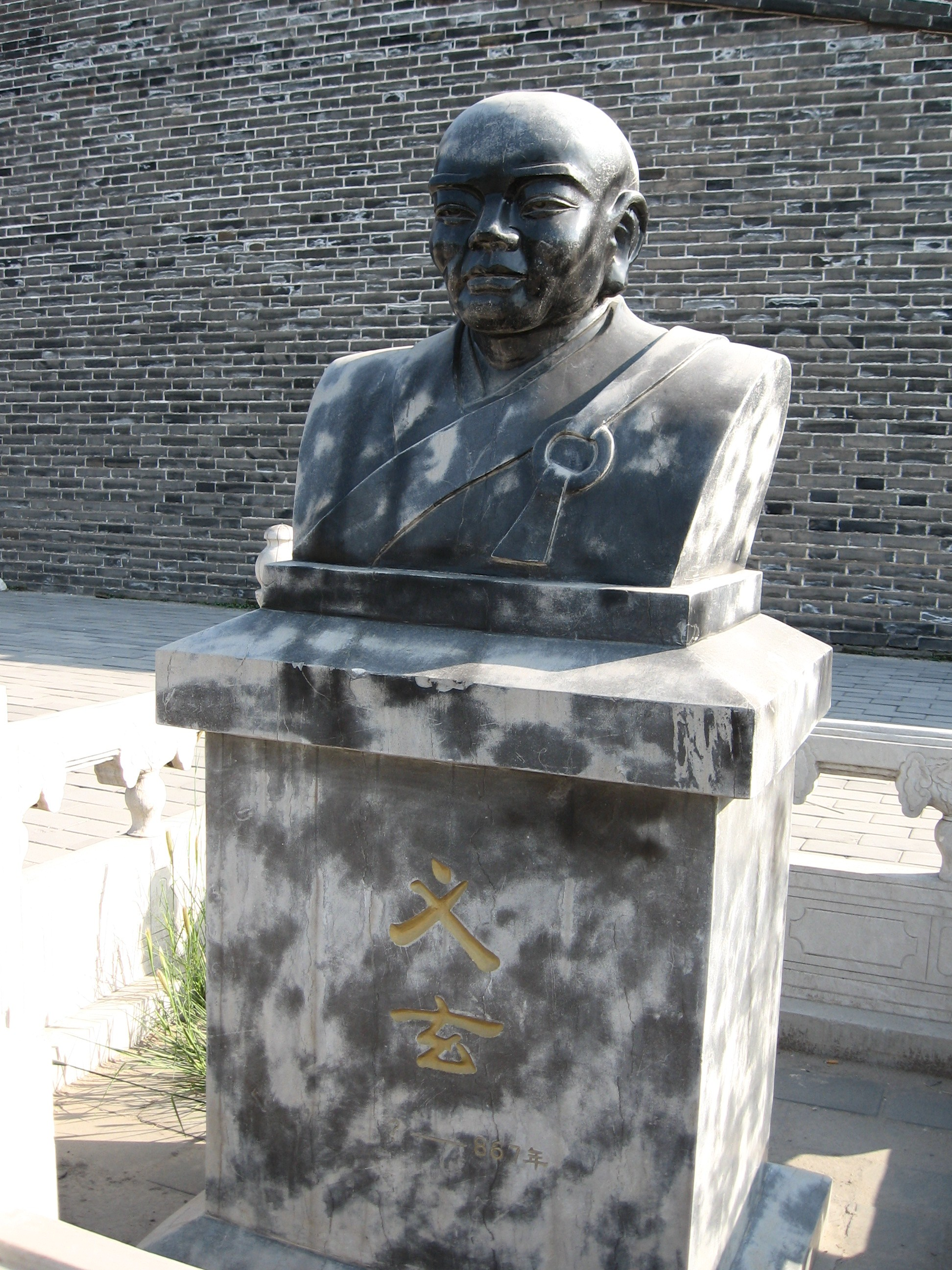
Statue of Linji Yixuan, the namesake of the Linji school.

The Linji school (Chinese: 臨濟宗; pinyin: Línjì zōng) is a school of Chan Buddhism named after Linji Yixuan (d. 866). It took prominence in Song China (960–1279), spread to Japan as the Rinzai school and influenced the nine mountain schools of Korean Seon.

== History ==
=== Five Dynasties and Ten Kingdoms Period (907–960/979 CE) ===
Before the Song dynasty, the Linji school was rather obscure and very little is known about its early history.

The Five Dynasties and Ten Kingdoms period (simplified Chinese: 五代十国; traditional Chinese: 五代十國; pinyin: Wǔdài Shíguó) (907–960/979 CE) was an era of political upheaval between the fall of the Tang dynasty and the founding of the Song. During this period, five dynasties quickly succeeded one another in the north, and more than twelve independent states were established, of which only ten are traditionally listed.

This division into various regions and kingdoms led to a diversification of Chan factions, reflected in the Five Houses of Chan. The Fayan school was especially influential in the Southern Tang (937–975) and Wuyue (907–978). It propagated jiaochan yizhi, "harmony between Chan and the Teaching", in opposition to jiaowai biechuan, "a special transmission outside the teaching", the latter eventually becoming one of the defining slogans of Chan.

=== Northern Song Dynasty (960–1127) ===
The Song was a ruling dynasty between 960 and 1279. It is divided into two distinct periods: Northern and Southern Song.

During the Northern Song (960–1127), the Song capital was in the northern city of Bianjing (now Kaifeng) and the dynasty controlled most of China proper. The Fayan school was the first faction to gain recognition at the Song court, due to the influence of the buddhist scholar-official Zanning (919–1001). After his death this position was taken over by the Linji school.

The Linji school brought together the classical elements of Chan Buddhism:

- The denlu-genre, the "Transmission of the Lamp";
- The yulu-genre, the recorded sayings of the masters of the Tang;
- The gongan collections, describing dialogues and interactions between masters and students, supplemented with introductions, commentary and poetry;
- The Hua Tou practice, the meditative concentration on the "word-head" of a gongan as an aid in attaining jianxing;
- The notion of "a special transmission outside the scripture" as one of the defining characteristics of Zen.

All of these elements, which shaped the picture of the iconoclastic Zen-master who transmits a wordless truth, were shaped by and dependent on literary products that shaped the Traditional Zen Narrative which furthered the position of the Linji-school. It is possible that this narrative does not describe the actual Chan-practice, of the Song-Dynasty, nor of the Tang Dynasty.

==== Linji ====
The Linji-school became the dominant school within Chan at the beginning of the Song due to support from literati and the court. The figure of Linji, as one of the exemplary masters of Chan, was detailed in a series of writings in the tenth and eleventh century, which supported the Linji school and contributed to its influence and standing.

===== Zutang ji (952) =====
The first mention of Linji is in the Zutang ji (祖堂集 "Anthology of the Patriarchal Hall), compiled in 952, 86 years after Linji's death. The Zutang ji was written to support the Xuefeng Yicun lineage. It pictures this lineage as heir to the legacy of Mazu and the Hongzhou school. It was written by two students of Zhaoqing Wendeng (884-972), a dharma descendant of Xuefeng Yicun, whose lineage was traced back to Shitou Xiqian (700-790). Xuefeng's student Yunmen Wenyan (862 or 864–949 CE) established the Yunmen school, while Xuefeng's "grand-disciple" Fayan Wenyi established the Fayan school.

===== Jingde Chuangdeng lu (1004) =====
The Transmission of the Lamp (景德傳燈錄), compiled in 1004 by Daoyuan, is one of the essential Chan writings. It was compiled by a member of the Fayan school, but published after editorial revision by Yang Yi (974–1020), a leading Song literati figure, and a supporter of the Linji faction at the Song court. The Fayang school still has prominence among the competing factions which are portrayed in the Chuangdeng lu, but the growing influence of the Linji-faction is emerging in this document.

The Transmission of the Lamp first gives brief biographical information on Linji, followed by Linji's interactions with Hunagbo, to strengthen the claim of Linji's descendancy form Hunagbo and the Mazu-lineage.

The Transmission of the Lamp served several needs and interests:

1. The needs of the Song to use Buddhism in centralizing the new state, and maintain good relations with neighboring Buddhist nations;
2. The interests of the Linji-faction, which was dominant around the capital city Bianjing;
3. The wish of the new dynasty to establish its own cultural style (wen); (Note: Wen (文), which includes Chinese literature, Chinese culture and Chinese writing)
4. The needs of literati, who were supporting a cultural style which endorsed free, spontaneous expression, different from a more traditional "ancient culture" (guwen).

The convergence of these influences led to the creation of the image of the iconoclastic Chan-master, who fulfilled all these requirements:

He was free and spontaneous, and so served the liberal wen faction in their struggle against the guwen partisans at court. He was untainted by any need for political power, and so did not threaten the authority of the dynasty or its bureaucracy. He was Buddhist, and so could be brought forward when the need arose to show that the empire supported Buddhism. He made for entertaining reading, which suited the needs of a newly-literated reading public. Finally, he asserted the superiority of the Linji lineage and its "golden age of Chan" style, thus suiting the then-dominant faction.

Nevertheless, this picture deviates from what is believed to be the character of many of the Chan-masters from earlier times, who were fairly conventional: "they routinely accepted invitations to court, received purple robes and honorary titles, and had monasteries built for them by rulers and officials".

===== Tiansheng Guangdeng lu (1029) =====
According to Welter, the real founder of the Linji school was Shoushan (or Baoying) Shengnian (首山省念, 926–993), a fourth generation dharma-heir of Linji. The Tiansheng-Era Expanded Lamp Record (天聖廣燈錄), compiled by the official Li Zunxu (李遵勗, 988–1038) confirms the status of Shoushan Shengnian, but also pictures Linji as a major Chan patriarch and heir to the Hongzhou school of Mazu Daoyi, displacing the prominence of the Fayan lineage. It also established the slogan of "a special transmission outside the teaching", supporting the Linji-school claim of "Chan as separate from and superior to all other Buddhist teachings".

Linji's teachings are already more or less completed in this document, and he is pictured as the dharma-heir of Huangbo Xiyun (d.850). The Guangdeng lu contains brief biographical details on the life and actions of Linji.

The main elements of classical Chan are fully displayed in the Tiansheng Era Expanded Lamp Record: encounter dialogue, enlightenment verses, the sayings of the masters and the commentaries upon these sayings, the lack of historical contextualization and biographical detail.

===== Sijia Yulu (1066–1069) =====
The Sijia yulu "Discourse Records of the Four Masters", compiled 1066–1069 by Huanglong Huinan (1002–1069), contains the discourse records of Mazu Daoyi (709–788), Baizhang Huaihai (720–814), Huangbo Xiyun (d.850) and Linji, the major patriarchs of the Tang Dynasty according to the Linji faction. In this text, Linji is explicitly placed in line with these teachers of the Hongzhou school.

Chan orthodoxy was still not settled by this time. At around the same time the Deshan Sijia lu was compiled, a comparable text containing the records of Deshan Xuanjian (780–865), whose lineage was traced back to Shitou Xiqian, and included the Chan-branch of Xuefeng Yicun, Yumen and Fayan. Other Sijia lu included the Huanglong Sijia (compiled 1141) and the Ciming Sijia lu (compiled 1153).

===== Zhenzhou Linji Huizhao Chansi yulu (1120) =====
The Zhenzhou Linji Huizhao Chansi yulu ("The record of Linji"), compiled by Yuanjue Zongan in 1120, is the classic version of the record of Linji. Yuanjue Zongan belonged to the Yunmen-faction, and also re-issued the Yunmen yulu, the "Discourse Records of Yunmen".

The separate publication of Linji's records signals the newly acquired status of Linji as one of Chan's major patriarchs. It also reflects the changing identity of Chan during the Song Dynasty, and the growing status of yulu-texts.

The text of Linji's record is the same as in the Tiansheng Guangdeng lu, but in a different order. The Linji yulu opens with lectures given by Ljnji at the request of the prefect Governor and other officials, highlighting the close connection of the Linji-faction with the court. The biographical data on Linji's life are expanded, and appear at the end of the text.

In the Linji yulu the phrase "a special transmission outside the scriptures" is ascribed to Linji himself. It served as a leading slogan for the establishment of the Linji Chan identity by the Linji-faction of Shoushan Shengnian, and was seen as trademark of the Linji Chan identity by Yang Yi and Li Zunxu, the court-related literati who had an essential role in the construction of Linji's record and reputation.

=== Southern Song Dynasty (1127–1279) ===
The Southern Song (Chinese: 南宋, 1127–1279) refers to the period after the Song lost control of northern China to the Jin dynasty. During this time, the Song court retreated south of the Yangtze and established their capital at Lin'an (now Hangzhou). The principal figures of the Linji-school also moved to the south.

==== Dahui and the hua-tou practice ====
During the 12th century, a clear difference between the Linji and the Caodong schools emerged. The two schools were competing for support of the literati, who became more powerful when the Song-government started to limit her influence on society. Hongzhi Zhengjue (1091–1157) of the Caodong-school emphasized silent illumination or shikantaza as a means for solitary practice, which could be undertaken by lay-followers. Dahui Zonggao (1089–1163) introduced kanhua practice, "observing the word-head", as a means of solitary practice. He organized the study of koans into a system, which was exported to Japan in this period.

=== Yuan Dynasty (1279–1368) ===
The Yuan Dynasty was the empire established by Kublai Khan, the leader of the Mongol clan of the Borjigin, after the Mongol Empire conquered the Jin and the Southern Song. Chan teachings started to be mixed with Pure Land Buddhism, as in the teachings of Zhongfeng Mingben (1263–1323).

=== Ming dynasty (1368–1644) ===
Chan Buddhism enjoyed something of a revival in the Ming dynasty with teachers such as Hanshan Deqing (憨山德清), who wrote and taught extensively on both Chan and Pure Land Buddhism; Miyun Yuanwu (密雲圓悟), as well as Yunqi Zhuhong (雲棲祩宏, 1535—1615) and Ouyi Zhixu (蕅益智旭). Linji Chan was "reinvented" during the late Ming by the "revival of beating and shouting practices" by Miyun Yuanwu (1566–1642), whose school was extremely influential and widespread, spreading even to Japan and Vietnam. Miyun himself led numerous communities of thousands of monks and confirmed twelve dharma heirs.

With the downfall of the Ming, several Chinese Chan masters fled to Japan, founding the Ōbaku school. Miyun came to be seen posthumously as the first patriarch of the Ōbaku school since his student Yinyuan Longqi (Japanese: Ingen Ryūki, 1592–1673) was the founder of Ōbaku.

This lineage also spread the Linji gōng'àn teachings to Vietnam, mainly through the efforts of Yuanshao 元韶 (1648–1728). According to Bingenheimer, "the Nguyên‑Thiêu lineage that began with Yuanshao was successful and is still one of the largest in Vietnamese Chan".

Chan was taught alongside Pure Land Buddhism in many Chinese Buddhist monasteries. In time much of the distinction between them was lost, and many masters taught both Chan and Pure Land.

=== Qing Dynasty (1644–1912) ===
The Qing dynasty was the last imperial dynasty of China.

At the beginning of the Qing, the Tiantong sect of Linji Chan continued to be very influential. This era saw the publication of the Wudeng yantong ("The strict transmission of the five Chan schools") by Feiyin Tongrong (1593–1662), a dharma heir of Miyun Yuanwu. The book placed self-proclaimed Chan monks without proper Dharma transmission in the category of "lineage unknown" (sifa weixiang), thereby excluding several prominent Caodong monks.

=== Modern times (after 1912) ===
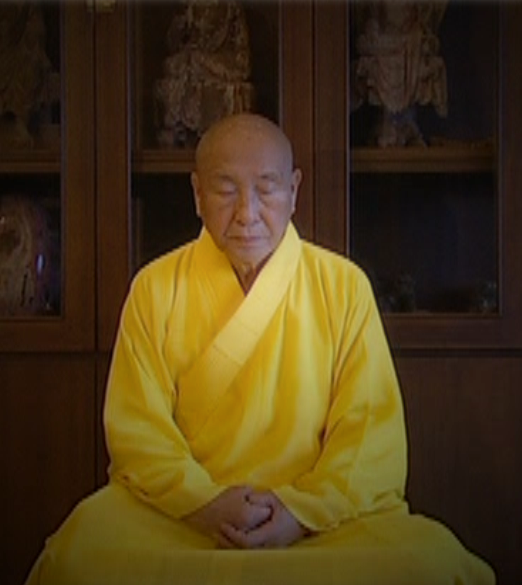
Traditional Chan Buddhist Grand Master Wei Chueh in Taiwan, sitting in meditation.

After further centuries of decline during the Qing, Chan was revived again in the early 20th century by Xuyun, a well-known figure of 20th-century Chinese Buddhism. Many Chan teachers today trace their lineage back to Xuyun, including Sheng-yen (聖嚴, Shèngyán) and Hsuan Hua (宣化, Xuānhuà), who have propagated Chan in the West where it has grown steadily through the 20th and 21st century.

Chan was repressed in China during the recent modern era in the early periods of the People's Republic, but has more recently been re-asserting itself on the mainland, and has a significant following in Taiwan and Hong Kong as well as among Overseas Chinese.

== Influence ==
=== Japan ===
The Japanese Zen sect known as the Rinzai school is a branch of the lineage Linji founded. The smaller Japanese Ōbaku school came to Japan in the 17th century as a separate Linji lineage and existed in Japan for many years as a culturally Ming Dynasty Chinese Zen within Japan.

Later the Ōbaku semi-merged into the Rinzai lineage after Hakuin Ekaku's revival of Rinzai in the 18th century. Today the Rinzai and Obaku schools are closely related. (Note: Joint Council for Japanese Rinzai and Obaku zen)

The now-defunct Fuke-shū also had close ties to the Rinzai school and claimed affiliation with the Linji lineage.

=== Korea ===
The Linji school had a considerable influence on the already existing Korean Jogye Order, the name adopted by the nine mountain schools, which were established by students of Mazu Daoyi. Jinul (知訥) (1158–1210) took over the Hua Tou practice of Dahui, but mixed it with the intellectual teachings of Guifeng Zongmi (780–841). Jinul emphasized sudden insight, to be followed by gradual cultivation.

The Korean Linji school faced the challenge of expressing its teachings of suchness without getting stuck in words or concepts; the alleged use of shouting and beating was instrumental in this non-conceptual expression—after the students were well educated in the Buddhist tradition.

==== Three Mysterious Gates ====
According to Buswell, the Korean Linji tradition used the Three Mysterious Gates (三玄門) schema to maintain the Chan emphasis on the nonconceptual nature of reality, while employing sūtras and teachings to instruct students. This schema contains three main elements:

1. The First Gate is the "mystery in the essence", the use of Buddhist philosophy, such as Huayan, to explain the interpenetration of all phenomena.
2. The Second Gate is the "mystery in the word", using the Hua Tou (Note: Stuart Lachs: "The Chinese term Hua-t’ou can be translated as “critical phrase.” Literally it means the “head of speech” or the “point beyond which speech exhausts itself.” In Korean, hua-t’ou are known as hwadu and in Japanese as wato [...] A hua-t’ou is a short phrase (sometimes a part of a koan) that can be taken as a subject of meditation and introspection to focus the mind in a particular way, which is conducive to enlightenment. (Note: Stuart Lachs (2012), Hua-t’ou : A Method of Zen Meditation)) for "the process of gradually disentangling the students from the conceptual workings of the mind".
3. The Third Gate is the "mystery in the mystery", "involving completely nonconceptual expressions such as striking or shouting, which are intended to remove all of the defects implicit in conceptual understanding".

=== Vietnam ===
The Linji school (Vietnamese: Tông Lâm Tế) was first transmitted to Vietnam during the Trần dynasty, primarily through Chinese Chan masters such as Thiền Phong (Tianfeng), Đạo Viên (Daoyuan), and others, as recorded in historic Vietnamese Zen chronicles by Phúc Diên. Major Linji texts like the Linji Lu and Dahui Yulu were introduced, significantly shaping the Vietnamese Thiền tradition.

Vietnamese rulers and monk-sages—including King Trần Thái Tông, Tuệ Trung Thượng Sĩ, Quốc sư Đại Đăng, and Phật Hoàng Trần Nhân Tông—were deeply influenced by these teachings. Trần Thái Tông engaged actively in kōan practice and formulated commentaries on 43 kōans, embedding principles such as the “Three Mysterious Gates” (Tam huyền), the “Three Essentials” (Tam yếu), and the “True Person of No Rank” (Vô vị chân nhân) into his instruction to monastics. King Trần Nhân Tông was particularly influenced by the Dahui Yulu, which he regularly lectured on for his monastic community.

By the 17th century, Linji Zen experienced a revival in northern Vietnam through Chinese monks such as Viên Văn Chuyết and Minh Hành Tại. Vietnamese master Chân Nguyên Tuệ Đăng played a pivotal role in reviving Trúc Lâm Zen literature and restoring Trúc Lâm monasteries. In central Vietnam, Chinese monks such as Nguyên Thiều, Minh Hoằng Tử Dung, Minh Hải Pháp Bảo, and Minh Lượng Thành Đẳng were invited by the Nguyễn lords to support monastic ordinations and the teaching of general Buddhist disciplines. However, they did not transmit the classical Linji *gong’an* (koan) or *huatou* methods.

An exceptional case was Minh Hoằng Tử Dung, a Chinese master who transmitted huatou-style practice to his Vietnamese disciple Liễu Quán Thiệt Diệu, formally recognizing his awakening (ấn chứng). Nonetheless, most Vietnamese Linji lineages focused on ceremonial Dharma-name succession rather than authentic enlightenment verification, diverging from traditional Chan criteria that mandate awakening confirmation for transmission.

In the late 20th century, Vietnamese-Chinese Zen master Thích Duy Lực of the Tào Động (Caodong) school guided many monks and laypeople in authentic Linji huatou practice, attracting large followings in southern Vietnam and California and producing respected translations of koan literature.

The Vietnamese Thiền Buddhist monk Thích Nhất Hạnh founded the Plum Village Tradition and the Order of Interbeing based on the Linji school. As stated in the charter:

The aim of the Order is to actualise Buddhism by studying, experimenting with, and applying Buddhism in modern life with a special emphasis on the bodhisattva ideal. The Order of Interbeing was founded within the Linji School of Dhyana Buddhism. It is grounded in the Four Spirits: the spirit of non-attachment from views, the spirit of direct experimentation on the nature of interdependent origination through meditation, the spirit of appropriateness, and the spirit of skillful means. All four are to be found in all Buddhist traditions.

== See also ==
- Mazu Daoyi
- Linji Yixuan
- Zen lineage charts
- Five Houses of Chan
- Caodong school
- Rinzai school
- Zazen
- Koan
- Putong Temple

== Sources ==
Printed sources

- Dumoulin, Heinrich (2005a), Zen Buddhism: A History. Volume 1: India and China, World Wisdom Books, ISBN 9780941532891
- Dumoulin, Heinrich (2005b), Zen Buddhism: A History. Volume 2: Japan, World Wisdom Books, ISBN 9780941532907
- Gregory, Peter N. (1991), Sudden Enlightenment Followed by Gradual Cultivation: Tsung-mi's Analysis of mind. In: Peter N. Gregory (editor)(1991), Sudden and Gradual. Approaches to Enlightenment in Chinese Thought, Delhi: Motilal Banarsidass Publishers Private Limited
- Jones, Charles B. (2010), "Review of Monks, Rulers and Literati: The Political Ascendancy of Chan Buddhism" (PDF), Journal of Buddhist Ethics
- McRae, John (2003), Seeing Through Zen. Encounter, Transformation, and Genealogy in Chinese Chan Buddhism, The University Press Group Ltd, ISBN 9780520237988
- Meng-Tat Chia, Jack (2011), "A Review of Enlightenment in Dispute: The Reinvention of Chan Buddhism in Seventeenth-Century China" (PDF), Journal of Buddhist Ethics, 18
- Schlütter, Morten (2008), How Zen became Zen. The Dispute over Enlightenment and the Formation of Chan Buddhism in Song-Dynasty China, Honolulu: University of Hawai'i Press, ISBN 978-0-8248-3508-8
- Sharf, Robert H. (2002), On Pure Land Buddhism and Ch'an/Pure Land Syncretism in Mediaeval China, Leiden, Netherlands: Brill
- Welter, Albert (2000), Mahakasyapa's smile. Silent Transmission and the Kung-an (Koan) Tradition. In: Steven Heine and Dale S. Wright (eds)(2000): "The Koan. Texts and Contexts in Zen Buddhism, Oxford: Oxford University Press
- Welter, Albert (2002), The Textual History of the Linji lu (Record of Linji): The Earliest Recorded Fragments
- Welter, Albert (2006a), The Formation of the Linji lu (PDF), archived from the original (PDF) on 2013-03-16
- Welter, Albert (2006b), Monks, Rulers, and Literati. The Political Ascendancy of Chan Buddhism, Wisdom Books
- Welter, Albert (2008), The Linji Lu and the Creation of Chan Orthodoxy: The Development of Chan's Records of Sayings Literature, Oxford University Press
- Yampolski, Philip (2003), Zen. A Historical Sketch. In: Buddhist Spirituality. Later China, Korea, Japan and the Modern World; edited by Takeuchi Yoshinori, Delhi: Motilal Banarsidass
- Young, Stuart (2009), Linji Lu and Chinese Orthodoxy. Review of "Albert Welter. The Linji lu and the Creation of Chan Orthodoxy: The Development of Chan's Records of Sayings Literature.

Web sources
