= Chongsheng Temple (Fujian) =

Buddhist temple in Fujian, China

- 崇聖寺
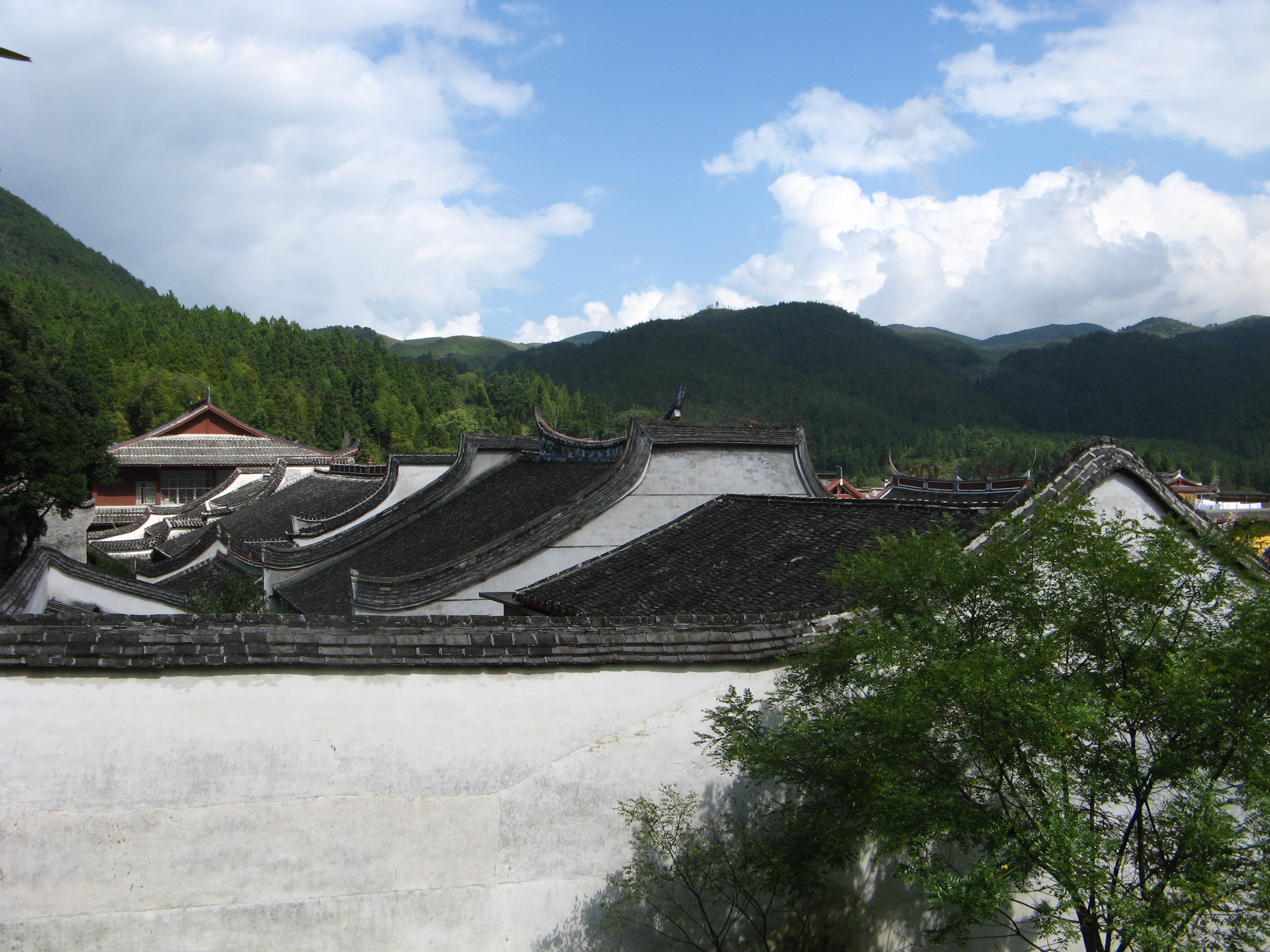
- Chongsheng Temple.

- Location within Fujian

Religion
- Affiliation: Buddhism
- Sect: Chan Buddhism

Location
- Location: Mount Xuefeng, Minhou County, Fujian
- Country: China
- Interactive map of Chongsheng Temple
- Coordinates: 26°24′14″N 119°03′03″E

Architecture
- Style: Chinese architecture
- Founder: Yicun (义存)
- Established: 870
- Completed: 1979 (reconstruction)

Chongsheng Temple (simplified Chinese: 崇圣寺; traditional Chinese: 崇聖寺; pinyin: Chóngshèng Sì) is a Buddhist temple located at the foot of Mount Xuefeng in Dahu Township, Minhou County, Fujian, China.

The oldest things in the temple are two 1000-year-old Tamarix chinensis trees, which were supposed planted by founding master Yicun and Wang Shenzhi.

== History ==
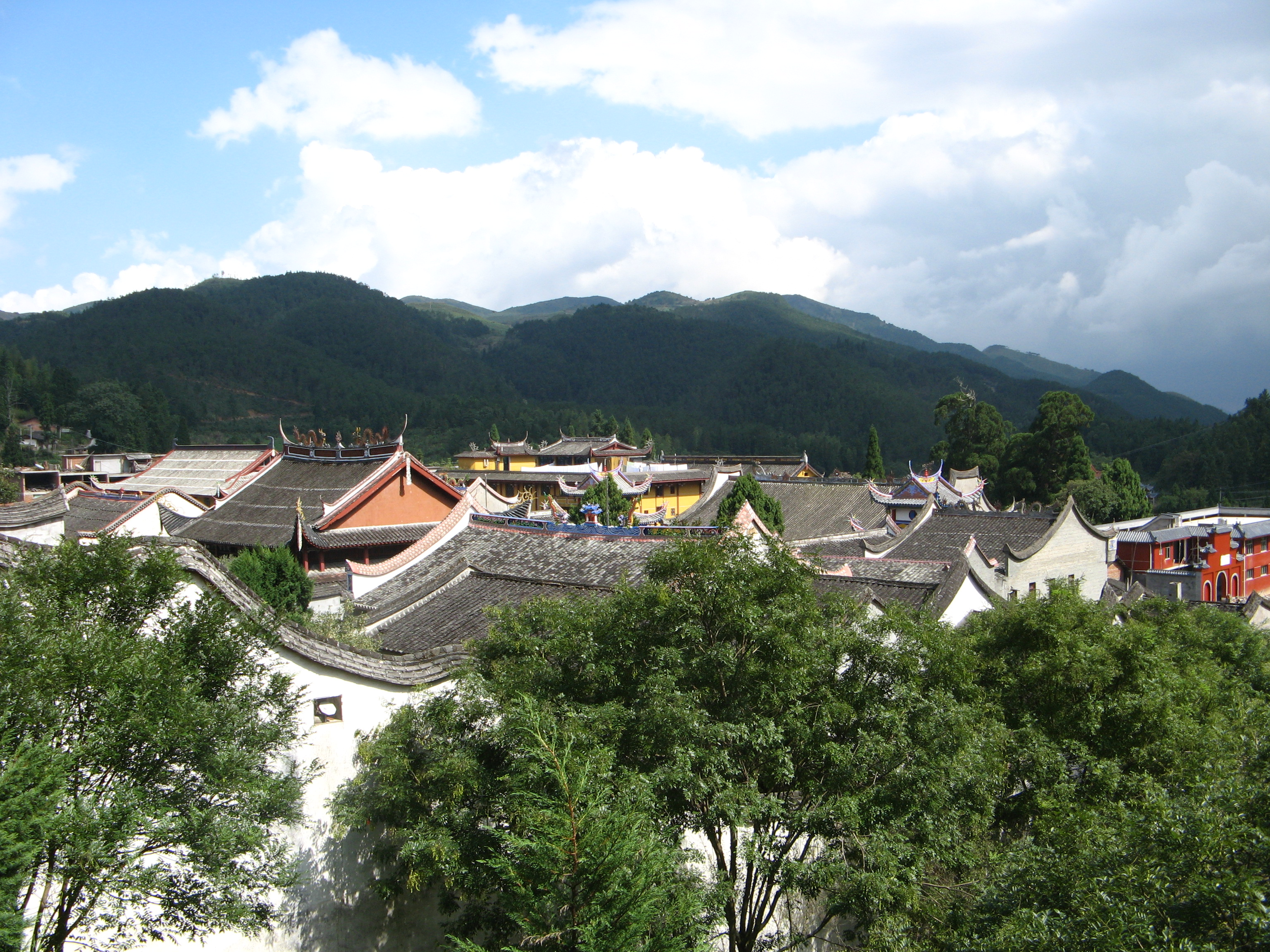
Buildings of Chongsheng Temple.

According to Song-dynasty Biographies of Eminent Monks (宋高僧传) and Record of the Transmission of the Lamp (景德传灯录), the temple was originally built as "Yingtian Xuefeng Chan Temple" (应天雪峰禅院) in 870 by Chan master Yicun (义存; 822–908), under the Tang dynasty (618–907). His disciples Yunmen Wenyan and Fayan Shibei founded Yunmen school and Fayan school respectively.

In 978, in the 3rd year of Taiping Xingguo in the Song dynasty (960–1279), Emperor Taizong honored the name "Xuefeng Chongsheng Chan Temple" (雪峰崇圣禅寺), which has been used to date.

Chongsheng Temple underwent two renovations in the Ming and Qing dynasties, respectively in the 2nd year of Yongle Emperor's reign (1404) by abbot Fa'an (法庵) and in the ruling of Guangxu Emperor (1887) by abbot Daben (达本).

In 1928, Yuan Ying, a prominent Buddhist monk, was unanimously chosen as the new abbot of Chongsheng Temple. He supervised the reconstruction of Chongsheng Temple. In 1937, after the Marco Polo Bridge Incident, the Second Sino-Japanese War broke out. Chongsheng Temple was subjected to bombardment during wars between Nationalists and the Imperial Japanese Army.

After the 3rd Plenary Session of the 11th Central Committee of the Chinese Communist Party, a policy of greater religious freedom was implemented. In 1979 the local government restored and rebuilt Chongsheng Temple on the original site. It has been designated as a National Key Buddhist Temple in Han Chinese Area by the State Council of China in 1983.

== Architecture ==
The complex include the following halls: Shanmen, Mahavira Hall, Hall of Four Heavenly Kings, Hall of Guanyin, Bell tower, Drum tower, Hall of Guru, Dharma Hall, Meditation Hall, Reception Hall, Dining Room, etc.
