= Anthology of the Patriarchal Hall =

- Traditional Chinese: 祖堂集
- Simplified Chinese: 祖堂集
Transcriptions
Standard Mandarin
- Hanyu Pinyin: Zǔtángjí
- IPA: [tsù.tʰǎŋ.tɕǐ]

The Anthology of the Patriarchal Hall (Chinese: 祖堂集; pinyin: Zǔtángjí; Japanese pronunciation: Sodōshū) is a Chan Buddhist lineage record compiled by two Buddhist monks in 952 during the Five Dynasties and Ten Kingdoms period.

Although biographies of the first Chan masters can be found in earlier texts such as the Record of the Masters and Disciples of the Laṅkāvatāra Sūtra (Lengqie shizi ji 楞伽師資記) and the Record of the Transmission of the Dharma Jewel (Chuan fabao ji 傳法寶紀), the Anthology of the Patriarchal Hall is the earliest text that extensively details a branching genealogy of multiple lineages.

Alongside the Transmission of the Lamp, it is the earliest example of a "lamp history" (denglu 傳燈錄), a genre of genealogical and hagiographical writing that is central to Chan Buddhism. The name of the genre uses the metaphor of a "lamp" as a reference to the Dharma (the light of Buddhist wisdom and enlightenment) being passed down continuously from one generation to the next.

In addition to providing biographies, it is also the oldest existing collection of Chan encounter dialogues, short paradoxical dialogues between a teacher and a student. Many of these dialogues would be turned into the famous koans featured in collections such as The Gateless Barrier and The Blue Cliff Record.

After being lost for centuries, it was rediscovered by Japanese scholars in the 20th century at the Haeinsa temple in Korea, in a complete form with all twenty chapters. The text survived in the form of printing plates made during the 13th century, and not as a printed book.

== Genealogy ==
No full English translation of the Anthology of the Patriarchal Hall exists. A complete English translation of fascicle 3 and other selected biographies can be found in Christoph Anderl's dissertation Studies in the Language of Zu-tang Ji, vol. 2 (2004). A translation and commentary on Mazu's biographical entry is provided by Mario Poceski in The Records of Mazu and the Making of Classical Chan Literature.

However, the full Chinese text may be found online courtesy of the Chinese Buddhist Electronic Text Association (CBETA), cataloged as B25, no. 144.

The first two fascicles establish the connection between India and China. The succession starts with the seven ancient Buddhas, ending in the historical Śākyamuni Buddha. Then, the lineage continues through the 28 Indian Patriarchs, ending with Bodhidharma. In Chan, Bodhidharma is considered the ancestor that brought Buddhism from India to China, and so he is also considered the first patriarch of Chan.

Fascicle 2 continues with successors of Bodhidharma, with his lineage continuing through Huike, Sengcan, Daoxin, Hongren, and Huineng, the sixth (and last) patriarch.

Fascicle 3 opens with Niutou Farong, associated with Daoxin and the Oxhead tradition. After Huineng's death, the text notes that the ceremonial robe of passed down from master to student was no longer handed down, and the teaching spread throughout the land. In essence, Huineng is recognized to have several successors, with no one formally recognized as the "seventh patriarch".

Instead, several students of Huineng are mentioned:

- National Teacher Huizhong. Although he did not have recognized successors of his own, he was very influential in the Tang dynasty court, being the personal teacher of the Tang emperors Suzong and Daizong.
- Heze Shenhui. Historians have noted Shenhui was profoundly influential in the polemical campaign to get Huineng recognized as the sixth patriarch. However, he did not have notable students associated with his line, save for Guifeng Zongmi.
- Qingyuan Xingsi, who was the teacher of Shitou Xiqian. Fascicles 4-13 largely follow the descendants of Shitou Xiqian, most notably Guishan Lingyou and Linji Yixuan.
- Nanyue Huairang, who was the teacher of Mazu Daoyi. Fascicles 14-20 follow Mazu and his descendants, most notably Dongshan Liangjie and Yunmen Wenyan.

The Anthology of the Patriarchal Hall also preserves biographies of Korean Buddhist monks. Fascicle 17 includes entries on key figures for the founding of Korean Seon, such as Master Doui (道義, d. 825), Master Hongcheok (洪陟, fl. 830), and Master Hyecheol (惠哲, 785–861), which the anthology identifies as heirs of Xitang Zhizang. Other notable figures in Korean Seon such as Beomil (Pŏmil, 810–889), Muyeom (Muyŏm, 800–888), and Sunji (fl. late 9th century) are also featured.

The Chinese Chan patriarchs and early branches

1. Bodhidharma
2. Huike
3. Sengcan
4. Daoxin
Niutou Farong	5. Hongren
6. Huineng
Qingyuan Xingsi	Nanyue Huairang	Heze Shenhui	National Teacher Huizhong
Shitou Xiqian	Mazu Daoyi	Guifeng Zongmi

The dashed line represents three intervening generations.

The Qingyuan–Shitou branch

Qingyuan Xingsi
Shitou Xiqian
Tianhuang Daowu	Yaoshan Weiyan
Longtan Chongxin	Yunyan Tansheng	Boatman Decheng	Daowu Yuanzhi
Deshan Xuanjian	Dongshan Liangjie	Jiashan Shanhui
Xuefeng Yicun	Yantou Quanhuo	Luopu Yuan’an

The Huairang–Mazu branch

Nanyue Huairang
Mazu Daoyi
Nanquan Puyuan	Baizhang Huaihai
Zhaozhou Congshen	Lu Gen	Guishan Lingyou	Huangbo Xiyun
Yangshan Huiji	Xiangyan Zhixian	Lingyun Zhiqin	Linji Yixuan
Sunji	Xinghua Cunjian

== Language and Grammar ==
The Anthology is particularly important for the study of the history of Chinese, as it contains what is believed to be a good record of what vernacular northern Chinese speech was like in the 10th century. An example of a grammatical phenomenon in the text is the use of 也 yě as a marker of the perfect, showing a coalescence of the Classical Chinese particles 也 yě and 矣 yǐ.

僧 問 居 此 多少 年 也。
sēng wèn jū cǐ duōshǎo nián yě
monk ask live PROX more-less year PERF
'The monk asked how many years you've lived here.' (book 4 86.5)

== See also ==
- The Jingde Record of the Transmission of the Lamp - The other significant Chan Buddhist genealogical record, commissioned in 1004.
- Zhuzi yulei
- Middle Chinese

== Bibliography ==
- Sun, Chaofen (1996). Word-Order Change and Grammaticalization in the History of Chinese. Stanford: Stanford University Press. ISBN 0804724180.
- Yanagida, Seizan (1980). Sodöshü sakuin (An index to Zutangji). Kyoto: Research Institute of Humanities, Kyoto University.
- The Zǔtáng jí (祖堂集) at the Gent University archive
