= Xuansha Shibei =

Tang dynasty Chan Buddhist monk

- 玄沙師備
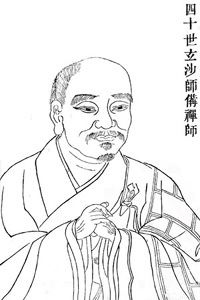

Personal life
- Born: 835 Fuzhou, Min Kingdom
- Died: 908 (aged 72–73)

Religious life
- Religion: Buddhism
- School: Chan Buddhism

Senior posting
- Teacher: Xuefeng Yicun

Xuansha Shibei (Chinese: 玄沙師備, 835–908) was a Chinese Chan monk in the lineage of Qingyuan Xingsi and a predecessor of the Fayan school of Chan Buddhism.

== Biography ==
Xuansha Shibei was born in Fuzhou in 835 and became a monk on Mount Furong in 860. He first studied with a monk named Yitong (義通) and later with the Hongzhou master Furong Lingxun. Shibei travelled to Kaiyuan Temple in Zhongling (鍾陵, modern-day Jiangxi), where he received monastic precepts from the Vinaya master Daoxuan in 864. Two years later, he visited Chan master Xuefeng Yicun and became his disciple. Xuansha followed the precepts so precisely that he received the nickname Bei Tuotuo (with "Tuotuo" meaning Dhutanga). He subsequently left Xuefeng and established a cloister on Mount Sheng (also known as Mount Xuansha) named Xuansha (玄沙). In 898, he was summoned to live in the cloister of Anguoyin in Fujian by the king of Min. He died in 908.
