= Yunmen Temple (Guangdong) =

Buddhist temple in Guangdong, China

- 雲門寺
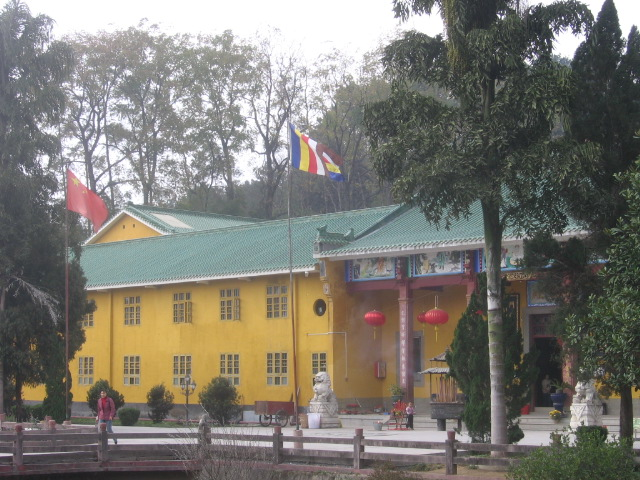
- Frontal view of Yunmen Temple.

- Location within Guangdong Location within China

Religion
- Affiliation: Buddhism
- Sect: Yunmen school
- Leadership: Shi Mingxiang (释明向)

Location
- Location: Rucheng Town, Ruyuan Yao Autonomous County, Guangdong
- Country: China
- Coordinates: 24°48′49″N 113°19′12″E

Architecture
- Style: Chinese architecture
- Founder: Yunmen Wenyan
- Established: 923
- Completed: 1943-1951 (reconstruction)

Yunmen Temple (simplified Chinese: 云门寺; traditional Chinese: 雲門寺; pinyin: Yúnmén Sì; Jyutping: Wan4 Mun4 Zi6*2) is a Buddhist temple located in Rucheng Town of Ruyuan Yao Autonomous County, Guangdong, China. Yunmen Temple is the cradle of Yunmen school, which is one of the five schools of Chan Buddhism. It was first built in the Tang dynasty (618–907), and went through many changes and repairs through the following dynasties. Most of the present structures in the temple were repaired or built between 1943 and 1951.

== History ==
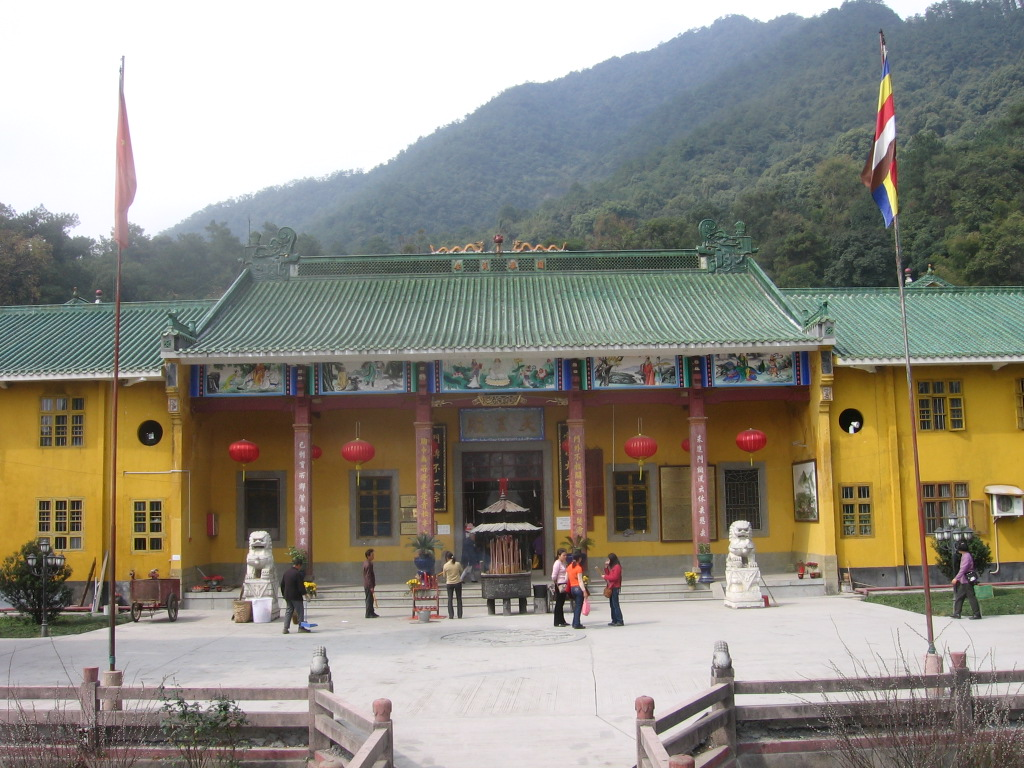
The Hall of Four Heavenly Kings.

=== Tang dynasty ===
This temple was first built by an accomplished monk Chan master Yunmen Wenyan in 923 during the late Tang dynasty (618–907). After the fall of the Tang dynasty, Yunmen Temple declined and was incredibly disappeared during the Republic of China.

=== Republic of China ===
In 1943, master Hsu Yun came to Yunmen Temple to promulgate Buddhist doctrines. Under his leadership, more than 300 buildings and halls and 100 statues of Buddha were added to the temple. Renovations and rebuilding to the temple began in 1943 and was completed in 1951.

=== People's Republic of China ===
After the establishment of the Communist State, Foyuan (佛源), a disciple of Hsu Yun, succeeded the position of abbot.

In 1966, Mao Zedong launched the Cultural Revolution, Yunmen Temple was badly damaged in this ten-year movement.

After the 3rd Plenary Session of the 11th Central Committee of the Chinese Communist Party, according to the national policy of free religious belief, regular scripture lectures, meditation and other features of temple life were resumed in 1983. That same year, Yunmen Temple was designated as a National Key Buddhist Temple in Han Chinese Area by the State Council of China.

== Architecture ==
The extant structure is based on the Qing dynasty building principles and retains the traditional architectural style. The complex include the following halls: Shanmen, Mahavira Hall, Hall of Four Heavenly Kings, Hall of Sangharama Palace, Bell tower, Drum tower, Hall of Guru, Dharma Hall, Memorial Hall of Hsu Yun, Dining Room, etc.
