= Shih-t'ou =

Shih-t'ou can refer to:

- Shitou Xiqian (Shih-t'ou Hsi-ch'ien), an 8th-century Zen Buddhist monk
- Stone City, an ancient fortified city in Nanjing, China
