= Chongsheng Temple =

Chongsheng Temple (simplified Chinese: 崇圣寺; traditional Chinese: 崇聖寺; pinyin: Chóngshèng Sì), may refer to:

- Chongsheng Temple (Fujian), in Minhou County, Fujian, China
- Chongsheng Temple (Shanxi), in Yushe County, Shanxi, China
- Chongsheng Temple (Yunnan), in Dali Town, Yunnan, China

Or, as simplified Chinese: 崇圣祠; traditional Chinese: 崇聖祠; pinyin: Chóngshèng Cí:

- The Hall for Admiration of the Sage at the Beijing Temple of Confucius
- The Hall for Admiration of the Sage at the Temple of Confucius at Fuzimiao, Nanjing
