= Nantai =

Nantai may refer to:

- Mount Nantai (男体山), stratovolcano in Tochigi Prefecture, Kantō, Honshu, Japan
- Nantai Island (南台岛), island on the Min River in Cangshan District, Fuzhou, Fujian, China
- Nantai Temple (南台寺), Buddhist temple on Mount Heng, in Hengyang, Hunan, China
- Nantai, Liaoning (南台镇), town in and subdivision of Haicheng, Liaoning, China
