= Nantai Temple =

Notable Buddhist temple in Hengyang, China

- 南台寺
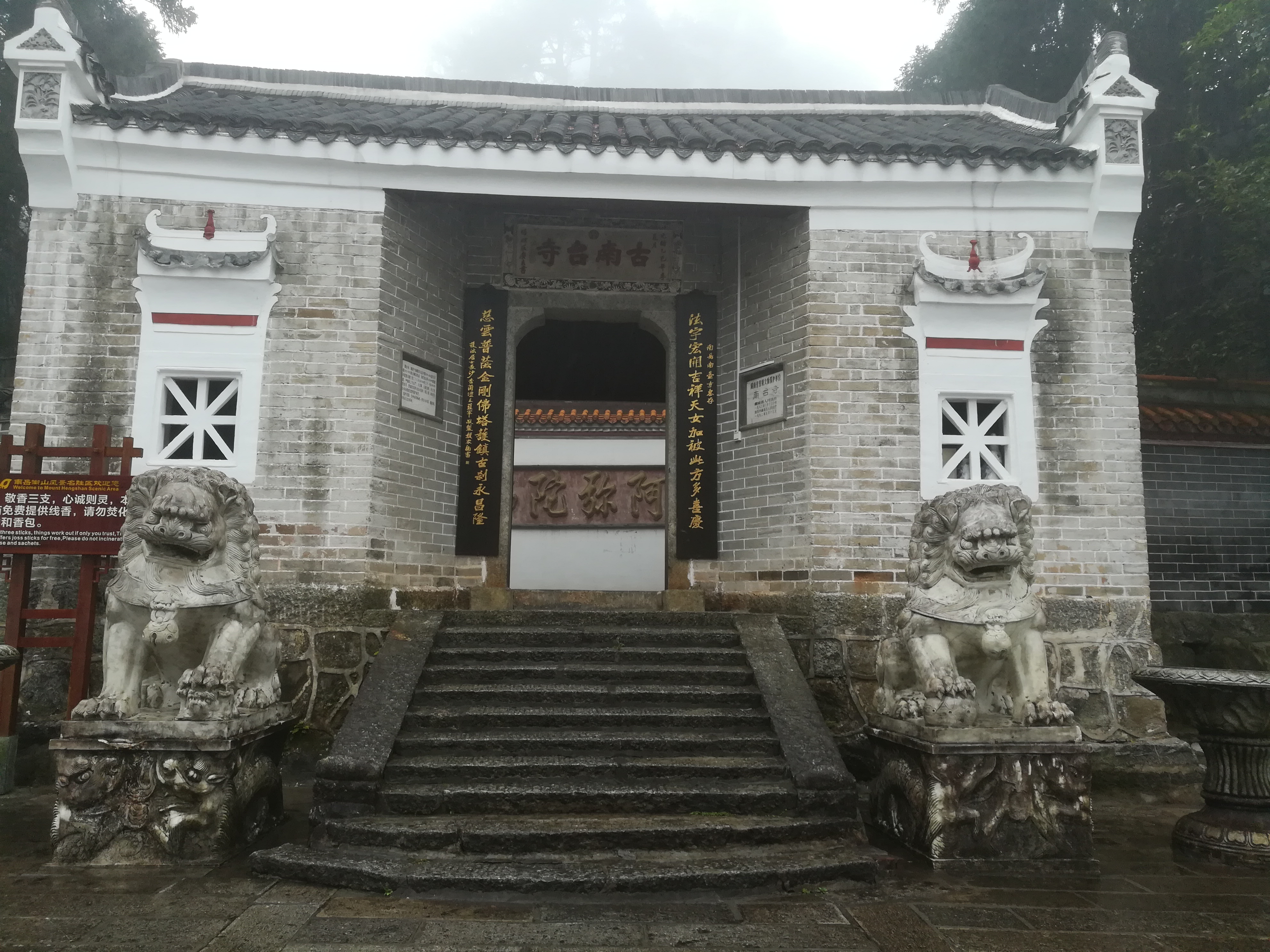
- The Shanmen of Nantai Temple.

- Location within Hunan

Religion
- Affiliation: Buddhism
- Sect: Chan Buddhism
- District: Nanyue District
- Prefecture: Hengyang
- Province: Hunan

Location
- Country: China
- Prefecture: Hengyang
- Coordinates: 27°15′54″N 112°42′59″E

Architecture
- Style: Chinese architecture
- Founder: Master Haiyin
- Established: 502-519

Nantai Temple (simplified Chinese: 南台寺; traditional Chinese: 南臺寺; pinyin: Nántaí Sì) is a Buddhist temple located on Mount Heng, in Nanyue District of Hengyang, Hunan, China. It is considered the ancestral temple of Caodong school, Fayan school and Yunmen school, and has also been classified as a National Key Buddhist Temple in Han Chinese Area in 1983.

== History ==
Nantai Temple was first built in the Tianjian period of Liang dynasty (502-557) by Master Haiyin (海印).

In 742, in the 2nd year of Tianbao period of Tang dynasty (618-907), Shitou Xiqian came to build a Buddhist temple here.

During the Hongzhi period (502-519) of Ming dynasty (1368-1644), a Buddhist temple was rebuilt by Master Wu'ai (无碍和尚).

During the Qianlong period of Qing dynasty (1644-1911), buildings and halls of Nantai Temple collapsed for neglect. In 1899, in the 25th year of Guangxu period, the reconstruction works started and lasted 5 years. In 1907, a Japanese Buddhist monk named 水野梅曉 donated 5,700 volumes of Buddhist scriptures and 32 palm leaf manuscripts to the temple.

During the Cultural Revolution, the red guards had attacked the temple. 5,700 volumes of Buddhist scriptures and 32 palm leaf manuscripts were either stolen, damaged or destroyed. Many original Buddha statues and musical instruments of the temple had been vandalised or destroyed. After the 3rd plenary session of the 11th Central Committee of the Chinese Communist Party, according to the national policy of free religious belief, Nantai Temple was reconstructed and reopened. In 1981, a Thai Chinese couple Huang Zhangren (黄彰任) and Ouyang Yu (欧阳愚) presented a gilt bronze Buddha statue to the temple. In 1983, Nantai Temple was rated as a National Key Buddhist Temple in Han Chinese Area. In 1987, Master Baotan (宝昙) was proposed as abbot of the temple. Under his leadership, the temple began a large-scale reconstruction project.

== Gallery ==
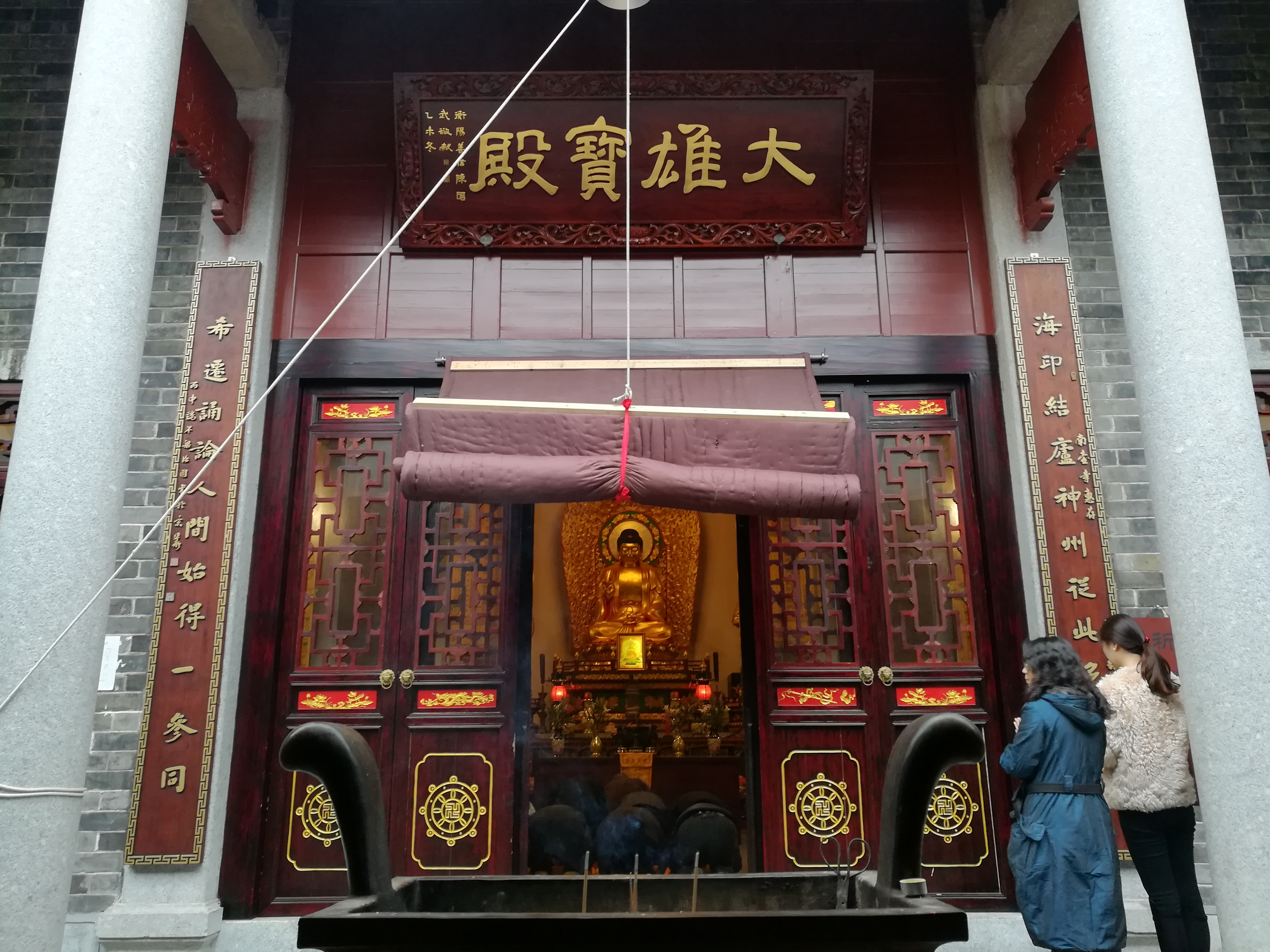
The Mahavira Hall.

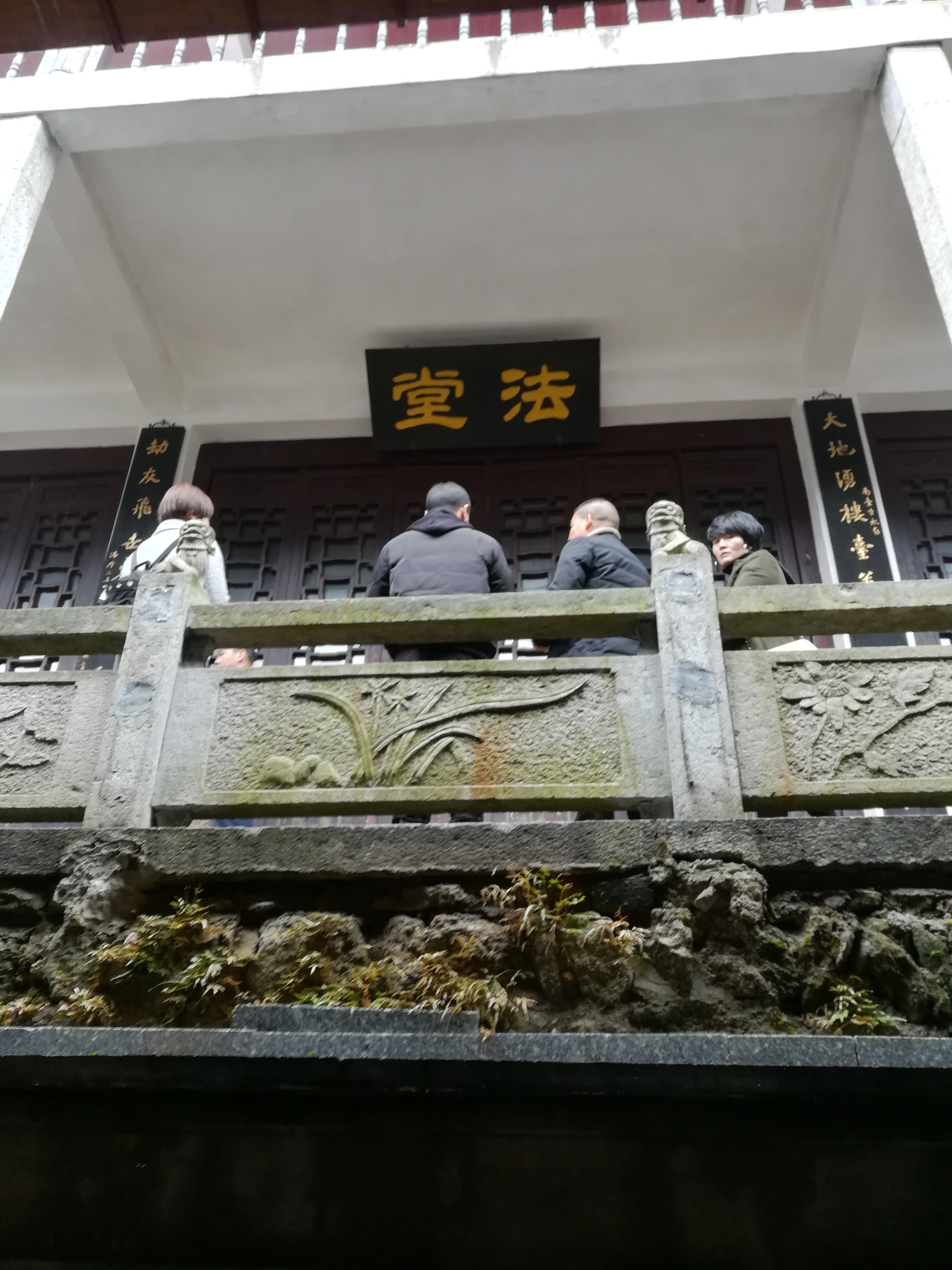
The Dharma Hall.

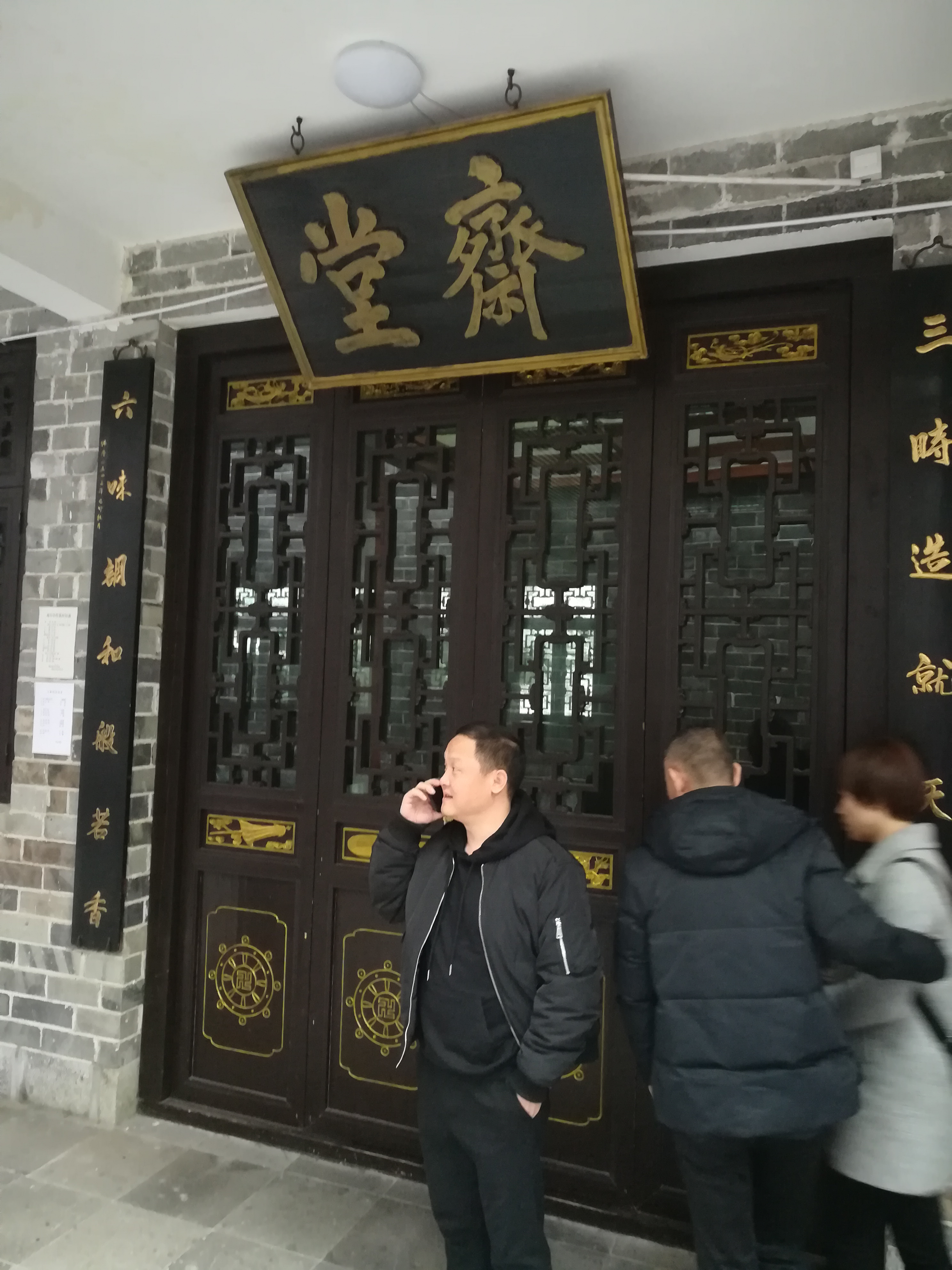
The Dining Hall.

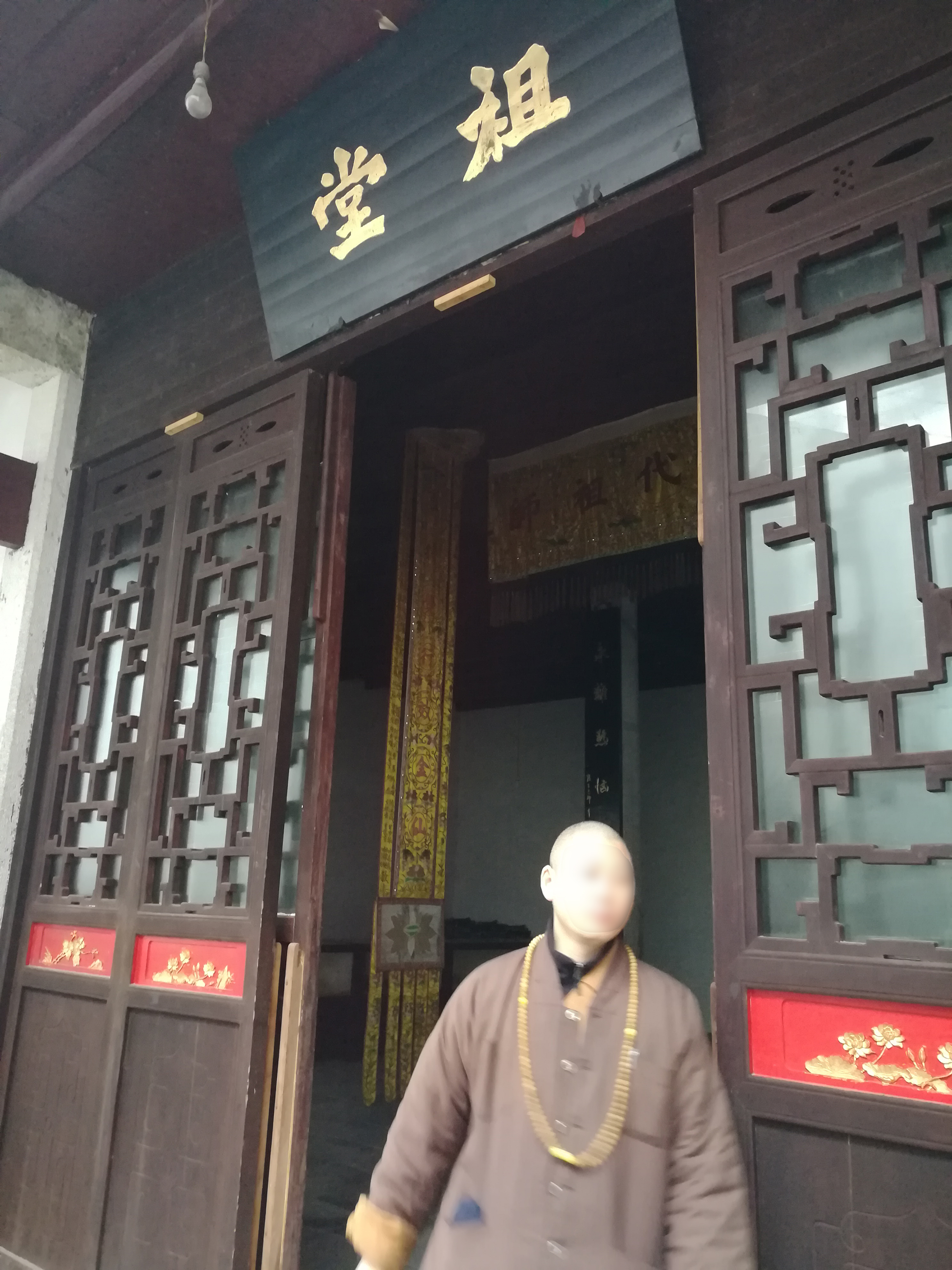
The Hall of Guru.

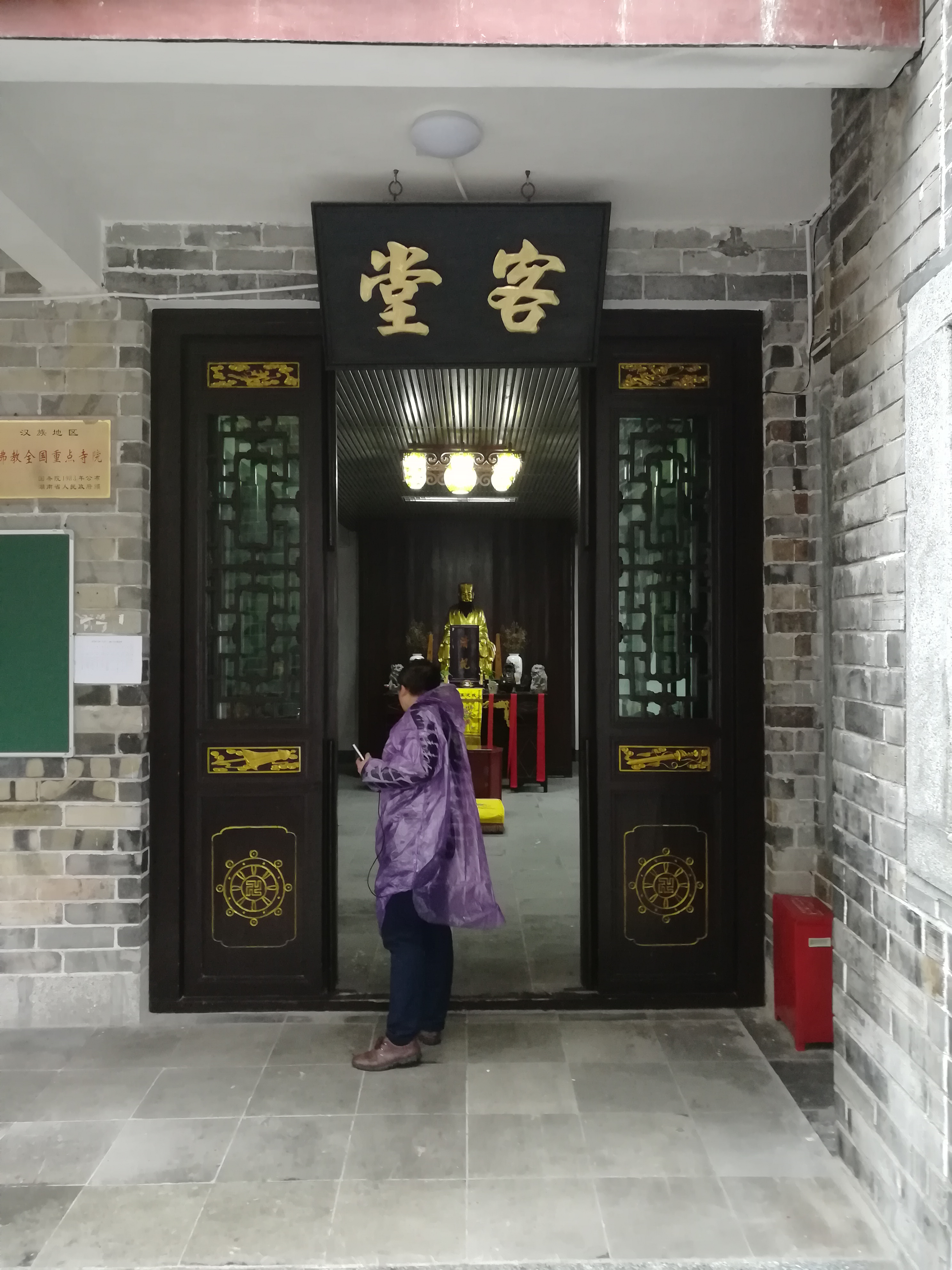
The Reception Hall.
