= Putong Temple =

Buddhist temple in China

- 普通寺

Religion
- Affiliation: Buddhism
- Deity: Linji school–Yangqi sect
- Leadership: Shi Yongxin

Location
- Location: Mount Yangqi, Shangli County, Jiangxi
- Country: China
- Interactive map of Putong Temple
- Coordinates: 27°50′12″N 113°53′48″E

Architecture
- Style: Chinese architecture
- Founder: Chengguang (乘广)
- Established: 753
- Completed: 1980s (reconstruction)

Website
- www.yangqiputongsi.com

Putong Temple (Chinese: 普通寺; pinyin: Pǔtōng Sì) is a Buddhist temple located on Mount Yangqi in Shangli County, Jiangxi, China. It is the cradle of the Yangqi sect of Linji school, one of five schools of Chan Buddhism.

== History ==
=== Tang dynasty ===
The temple was built as "Guangli Chan Temple" (广利禅寺) by a renowned Chan master Chengguang (乘广) in 753, during the reign of Emperor Xuanzong in the Tang dynasty (618–907). It was enlarged by Chan master Zhenshu (甄叔) in the Dali era between 766 and 779.

=== Song dynasty ===
During the ruling of Emperor Renzong (1023–1063) in the Song dynasty (960–1279), Yangqi Fanghui (杨岐方会), the Eighth Patriarch of Linji school and the founder of Yangqi sect, was invited to be the new abbot. He renamed the temple "Putong Temple", which has been used to date.

=== Ming dynasty ===
In 1374, at the dawn of Ming dynasty (1368–1644), monk Siguan (嗣观) restored the temple.

=== Qing dynasty ===
In 1736, in the 1st year of Qianlong period in the Qing dynasty (1644–1911), monks of Putong Temple raised funds to renovated and refurbished the temple.

In 1826, five years after the coronation of Daoguang Emperor, heavy rainfall in the mountain caused a catastrophic flood, Putong Temple was struck by it. In 1844, the reconstruction project of the temple was launched. The reconstruction took 7 years, and lasted from 1844 to 1850.

=== People's Republic of China ===
On July 1, 1957, the Jiangxi Provincial Government inscribed the temple as a provincial level cultural heritage.

In 1966, Mao Zedong launched the ten-year Cultural Revolution, the Red Guards attacked the temple and the government forced monks to return to secular life.

After the 3rd Plenary Session of the 11th Central Committee of the Chinese Communist Party, according to the national policy of free religious belief, Putong Temple was reopened for worship on.

In February 2010, Huitong (慧通) was proposed as the new abbot of Putong Temple. Two years later, Shi Yongxin, the abbot of Shaolin Monastery, was unanimously chosen as Huitong's successor.

In June 2013, the Stupa of Chengguang and the Stupa of Zhenshu were listed among the seventh group of "Major National Historical and Cultural Sites in Jiangxi" by the State Council of China.

== Architecture ==
Putong Temple occupies a building area of 1,200-square-metre (13,000 sq ft) and the total area including temple lands, forests and mountains is over 7,600-square-metre (82,000 sq ft). The existing main buildings of Putong Temple include the Shanmen, Four Heavenly Kings Hall, Mahavira Hall, Hall of Maitreya, Hall of Guanyin, Hall of Guru, Buddhist Texts Library, Stupa of Chengguang, and Stupa of Zhenshu.

=== Mahavira Hall ===
The Mahavira Hall has a single-eave gable and hip roof. It is 16-metre (52 ft) deep, 12-metre (39 ft) wide and 13-metre (43 ft) high. The hall enshrining the Three Sages of the West (西方三圣), namely Guanyin, Amitabha and Mahasthamaprapta. The statues of Eighteen Arhats stand on both sides of the hall.

=== Stupa of Chengguang ===
The Stupa of Chengguang (乘广禅师塔) was built in the Tang dynasty after the Parinirvana of Chan master Chengguang (乘广). The 2.73-metre (8 ft 11 in) tall and octagonal-based Chinese pagoda is made of granite. On the outside, it was carved with reliefs of various Buddhas, lotuses, Hercules, monsters, etc.

=== Stupa of Zhenshu ===
The Stupa of Zhenshu (甄叔禅师塔) was also built in the Tang dynasty in memory of Chan master Zhenshu (甄叔), who made a significant contribution to Putong Temple. It is 1.78-metre (5 ft 10 in) high and 0.88-metre (2 ft 11 in) wide.
