= Shitou Xiqian =

Chinese Chan Buddhist teacher (700–790)

Shitou Xiqian 石頭希遷
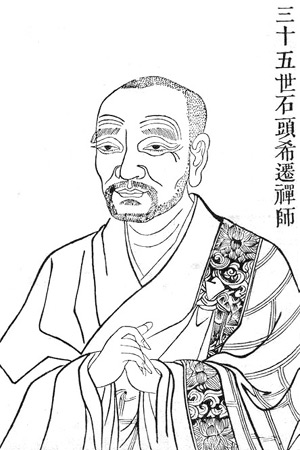
- Woodcut from 『佛祖正宗道影』(1880)
- Title: Chán master

Personal life
- Born: 700 Gaoyao, China
- Died: 790 (aged 90)

Religious life
- Religion: Buddhism
- School: Chán

Senior posting
- Teacher: Qingyuan Xingsi; Dajian Huineng
- Predecessor: Qingyuan Xingsi
- Successor: Yaoshan Weiyan
- Students: Yaoshan Weiyan Danxia Tianran

Shitou Xiqian (700–790) (traditional Chinese: 石頭希遷; simplified Chinese: 石头希迁; pinyin: Shítóu Xīqiān; Wade–Giles: Shih-t'ou Hsi-ch'ien; Japanese: Sekitō Kisen) was an 8th-century Chinese Chan Buddhist teacher and author. All existing branches of Chan throughout the world are said to descend either from Shitou Xiqian or from his contemporary Mazu Daoyi.

== Biography ==
=== Life ===
The details of Shítóu's life are found in traditional biographies. His years of life are conventionally given as 700 to 790. He was born in Gaoyao County in Guangdong with the surname Chen.

At a young age, he became a student of the great Chan patriarch Huineng for a short time prior to the latter's death. Shítóu later became a disciple of Huineng's successor, Qingyuan Xingsi. After becoming, in turn, Xingsi's successor, Shítóu resided and taught at Nantai Temple on Mt. Nanyue Heng in Hunan. There he lived on top of a large rock, hence his first name Shítóu, which translates to "Stone-head."

After his death, he was given the honorary posthumous name Wuji Dashi (無際大師).

=== Physical remains ===
There have been a series of disputed claims regarding the current location of Shitou's physical remains. There is a mummy at Mt. Sekito Temple in Japan which is said to be Shitou's. Various Japanese sources state that this mummy was rescued by a Japanese traveller from a fire at a temple in Hunan during the chaos of the rebellion that overthrew the Qing Dynasty (1911–1912). Chinese sources often state instead that it was stolen by Japanese forces during the Second Sino-Japanese War (1937–1945). Researcher James Robson argues that there is little evidence Shitou's body was mummified and that the remains enshrined at Mt. Sekito Temple are likely those of a different monk also named Wuji.

== Writings ==
Shítóu is credited with the authorship of two well-known Chan Buddhist poems. The Sandokai lays out a comprehensive view of the nature of truth. The Song of the Grass Hut is a paean to a life of secluded meditation.

== Influence ==
Scholar Mario Poceski writes that Shítóu does not appear to have been influential or famous during his lifetime:

He was a little-known teacher who led a reclusive life and had relatively few disciples. For decades after Shitou's death, his lineage remained an obscure provincial tradition.

Sayings to the effect that Shitou and Mazu were the two great masters of their day date from decades after their respective deaths. Shítóu's retrospective prominence owes much to the importance of Dongshan Liangjie, a 9th-century teacher who traced his lineage back to Shítóu.

	Six Patriarchs
	Huineng (638-713) (WG: Hui-neng. Jpn: Enō)
	Qingyuan Xingsi (660-740) (WG: TCh'ing yüan Hsing-ssu. Jpn: Seigen Gyōshi)
0	Shitou Xiqian (700-790) (WG: Shih-t'ou Hsi-ch'ien. Jpn: Sekitō Kisen)
1	Tianhuang Daowu (748-807) (WG: T'ien-huang Tao-wu. Jpn: Tennō Dago)		Yaoshan Weiyan (ca.745-828) (Yao-shan Wei-yen, Jpn. Yakusan Igen)
2	Longtan Chongxin (8th/9th century) (WG: Lung-t'an Ch'ung-hsin; Jpn: Ryūtan Sōshin)		Yunyan Tansheng (780-841) (Yün-yen T'an-shen, Jpn. Ungan Donjō)
3	Deshan Xuanjian (782-865) (WG: Te-shan Hsüan-chien; Jpn: Tokusan Senkan)		Dongshan Liangjie (807-869); Tung-shan liang-chieh, Jpn. Tōzan Ryōkai)
4	Xuefeng Yicun (822-908)(雪峰 义 存) (WG: Hsüeh-feng I-ts'un. Jpn: Seppō Gison)		Caoshan Benji (840-901) (Ts'ao-shan Pen-chi, Jpn. Sōzan Honjaku)	Yunju Daoying (d.902) (Yün-chü Tao-ying, Jpn. Ungo Dōyō)
5	Jingqing Daotu (ca.863-937) (WG: Ching-ch'ing Tao-fu. Jpn: Kyōsei Dōfu)	Yunmen Wenyan (864-949) (WG: Yün-men Wen-yen. Jpn: Ummon Bun'en)	Caodong school	8 generations
6	Xuansha Shibei (835-908)	Dongshan Shouchu (910-990)		Dōgen
7	Luohan Guichen (867-928)	Yunmen school		Sōtō
8	Fayan Wenyi (885-958)
9	Fayan school

== See also ==
- Sandokai

== Sources ==
- Poceski, Mario (2007), Ordinary Mind as the Way: the Hongzhou School and the Growth of Chan Buddhism, Oxford University Press, ISBN 978-0-19-531996-5

Buddhist titles
Preceded by Qingyuan Xingsi	Caodong Chan/Sōtō Zen patriarch	Succeeded by Yaoshan Weiyan
