= Fayan school =

Chan Buddhist sect

The Fayan school, or Fayan House (Chinese: 法眼宗; pinyin: Fǎyǎn Zōng) was one of the Five Houses of Chan, the major schools of Chan Buddhism during the later Tang dynasty.

== History ==
=== Origins ===
The Fayan school was named after Chinese Zen Master Qingliang Wenyi (885–958).

Via Xuefeng Yicun the Fayang school and Yunmen school are traced back to Shitou Xiqian and Huineng. Xuefeng was one of the most influential Chán-teachers at the end of the Tang dynasty, when "a widely influential zen center formed around Xuefeng Yicun". The loss of control by the Tang dynasty, and the accompanying loss of support for Buddhist institutions, lead to a regionally based Chan of Xuefeng and his students.

The Zutang ji (祖堂集 "Anthology of the Patriarchal Hall"), compiled in 952, the first document which mentions Linji Yixuan, was written to support the Xuefeng Yicun lineage. It pictures this lineage as heir to the legacy of Mazu and the Hongzhou-school, though Xuefeng Yicun's lineage is traced back to Shitou Xiqian (700–790). It was written by two students of Zhaoqing Wendeng (884–972), a dharma descendant of Xuefeng Yicun.

| | Six Patriarchs |
| | Huineng (638–713) (WG: Hui-neng. Jpn: Enō) |
| | Qingyuan Xingsi (660–740) (WG: TCh'ing yüan Hsing-ssu. Jpn: Seigen Gyōshi) |
| | Shitou Xiqian (700–790) (WG: Shih-t'ou Hsi-ch'ien. Jpn: Sekitō Kisen) |
| | Tianhuang Daowu (748–807) (WG: T'ien-huang Tao-wu. Jpn: Tennō Dago) |
| | Longtan Chongxin (8th/9th century) (WG: Lung-t'an Ch'ung-hsin; Jpn: Ryūtan Sōshin) |
| | Deshan Xuanjian (782–865) (WG: Te-shan Hsüan-chien; Jpn: Tokusan Senkan) |
| 0 | Xuefeng Yicun (822–908)(雪峰 义 存) (WG: Hsüeh-feng I-ts'un. Jpn: Seppō Gison) |
| 1 | Jingqing Daotu (ca.863–937) (WG: Ching-ch'ing Tao-fu. Jpn: Kyōsei Dōfu) | Yunmen Wenyan (864–949) (WG: Yün-men Wen-yen. Jpn: Ummon Bun'en) |
| 2 | Xuansha Shibei (835–908) | Dongshan Shouchu (910–990) |
| 3 | Luohan Guichen (867–928) | Yunmen school |
| 4 | Fayan Wenyi (885–958) |
| | Fayan school |

=== Five Dynasties and Ten Kingdoms period (907–960/979) ===
During the Five Dynasties and Ten Kingdoms period the Fayan school became the dominant school in Southern Tang (Jiangxi) and Wuyue. It propagated jiaochan yizhi, "harmony between Chan and the Teaching", in opposition to jiaowai biechuan, "a special transmission outside the teaching", the latter eventually becoming one of the defining slogans of Chan.

=== Absorption into the Linji school ===
Over the course of Song dynasty (960–1279), the Fayan school, along with the Guiyang and Yunmen schools were gradually absorbed into the Linji school.

== Sources ==
- Dumoulin, Heinrich (2005). Zen Buddhism: India and China. World Wisdom, Inc. ISBN 978-0-941532-89-1.
- McRae, John R. (2003). Seeing through Zen: Encounter, Transformation, and Genealogy in Chinese Chan Buddhism. University of California Press. ISBN 978-0-520-93707-9. Archived from the original on 2023-01-11.
- Welter, Albert (2006). "The Formation of the Linji lu: An Examination of the Guangdeng lu/Sijia yulu and Linji Huizhao Chanshi yulu Versions". Proceedings of the Third Annual Buddhist Studies Conference in Korea. 3 (2).
- Welter, Albert (2000). "Mahākāśyapa's smile. Silent Transmission and the Kung-an (Koan) Tradition". In Heine, Steven; Wright, Dale S. (eds.). The Koan: Texts and Contexts in Zen Buddhism. Oxford University Press. ISBN 978-0-19-802780-5. Archived from the original on 2023-01-11.
