= Buddhamitra (disambiguation) =

Buddhamitra is a Sanskrit personal name and may refer to:

- Buddhamitra (born circa 60) was a Buddhist nun from India.
- Buddhamitra (Zen Patriarch), the ninth Indian Patriarch of Zen Buddhism
- Buddhamitra the teacher of Vasubandhu
- Buddhamitra (grammarian) - an 11th century Buddhist scholar and chief who wrote an important grammatical text called Veera Chozham or Virasoliyam which covers the five branches of Tamil grammar: Ezhuthu (orthography), Sol (etymology), Porul (subject matter), Yaappu (prosody), and Alankaram (rhetoric), synthesizing both Tamil and Sanskrit grammatical traditions.
