= Deshan Xuanjian =

Chinese Zen Buddhist monk

Deshan Xuanjian 德山宣鑒
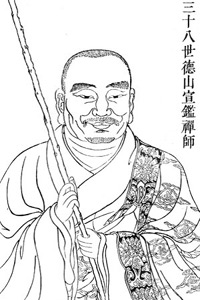
- Title: Chán master

Personal life
- Born: 780/2; Jiannan, Sichuan Province, China
- Died: 865

Religious life
- Religion: Buddhism
- School: Chán/Zen

Senior posting
- Teacher: Longtan Chongxin
- Predecessor: Longtan Chongxin
- Successor: Xuefeng Yicun
- Students: Xuefeng Yicun

Deshan Xuanjian (Chinese: 德山宣鑒; Wade–Giles: Te-shan Hsuan-chien; Pinyin: Déshān Xuānjiàn; Japanese: Tokusan Senkan), was a Chinese Zen Buddhist monk during the Tang dynasty. He was born in Jiannan in what is now Sichuan Province. He is remembered for hitting his students with a cane to express awakening. Through his student Xuefeng Yicun, he is the ancestor to two of the Five Houses of Zen, the Yunmen School and the Fayan School. Earlier in his life he was a scholar focused on the Vinaya, and later he became famous for his knowledge of the Diamond Sutra. However, a famous kōan story recorded in the Blue Cliff Record and Shōbōgenzō Shin fukatoku relates an encounter he had with an old woman that convinced him that scriptural study on its own fails to bring about awakening. After this he studied under the Zen teacher Longtan Chongxin. During the reign of Emperor Wuzong of Tang, the brief but intense Great Anti-Buddhist Persecution was initiated and Deshan was forced from a thirty year long position in Lizhou into hiding on Mt. Dufu. Afterwards the governor of Wuleng in what is now Hunan Province asked Deshan to come to live on Mount Virtue, known in Chinese as "Deshan", the mountain after which he is named.
