= Qingyuan Xingsi =

Qingyuan Xingsi 青原行思
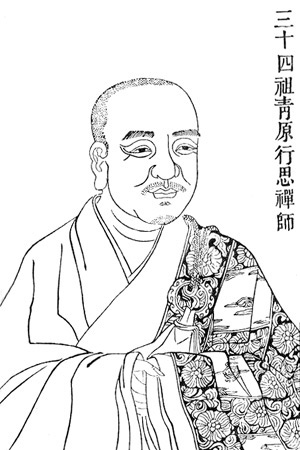
- Title: Chán master

Personal life
- Born: 660 Jiangxi, China
- Died: 740

Religious life
- Religion: Buddhism
- School: Chán

Senior posting
- Teacher: Dajian Huineng
- Predecessor: Dajian Huineng
- Successor: Shitou Xiqian
- Students: Shitou Xiqian

Qingyuan Xingsi (Chinese: 青原行思; pinyin: Qīngyuán Xíngsī; Japanese: Seigen Gyōshi; Korean: Ch'ŏngwŏn Haengsa; Vietnamese: Thanh Nguyên Hành Tư) was a Chan/Zen Buddhist monk during the Tang dynasty. Three of the five traditionally recognized houses of Chan are commonly believed to have developed out of his lineage: the Caodong/Sōtō, Yunmen, and Fayan. There is scant information about his life. He is said to have lived in the Quiet Abode Temple on Mount Qingyuan.

The Transmission of the Lamp claims he was Huineng's foremost student, although this was written during the Song dynasty over 200 years after Qingyuan's death. In fact, in the oldest version of the Platform Sutra found among the Dunhuang manuscripts, which dates to about 850 CE, Qingyuan is not listed as a student of Huineng at all. The earliest source of information about Qingyuan comes from the Anthology of the Patriarchal Hall, which was completed in 952 by the monk Wendeng. The scholar Albert Welter suggests that Wendeng may have invented Qingyuan in order to legitimize Shitou Xiqian, Qingyuan's supposed student, and in turn himself since he was descended from Shitou. Shitou's original teacher, Huineng, died when Shitou was only 13, so Qingyuan was necessary for him to receive legitimate dharma transmission.

== Biographical legends ==
As with most Tang dynasty Chan monks, there are many vivid stories about Qingyuan's encounters with students and other teachers. They are almost certainly not historical events, however. The Transmission of the Lamp, for example, recounts the following:

When Shenhui of Ho Chen came to study with Qingyuan, the master asked where he was coming from, and Shenhui said from Cao Xi. "What's new in Cao Xi?" asked Qingyuan. When Shenhui remained silent, Qingyuan said, "Tiles and pebbles are still in your way". Shenhui asked, "Do you have true gold to give to others?" Qingyuan said, "Even if I had some, how would you hold on to it?"

Another from the same source takes place as follows:

Once a monk asked, "What is the main teaching of Buddhism?" Qingyuan replied, "What is the price of rice in Luling?"

Buddhist titles
Preceded by Dajian Huineng	Caodong Chan/Sōtō Zen patriarch	Succeeded by Shitou Xiqian
