= Wumen Huikai =

Chinese Zen master

- Title: Chan master

Personal life
- Born: 1183 Hangzhou, China
- Died: 1260 (aged 76–77)

Religious life
- Religion: Buddhism
- School: Chan
- Lineage: Linji

Senior posting
- Predecessor: Yuelin

Wumen Huikai (simplified Chinese: 无门慧开; traditional Chinese: 無門慧開; pinyin: Wúmén Huìkāi; Wade-Giles: Wu-men Hui-k'ai; Japanese: Mumon Ekai) (1183–1260) was a Chinese Chan (Japanese: Zen) master during China‘s Song period. He is most famous for having compiled and commentated the 48-koan collection The Gateless Barrier (Mandarin: 無門關 Wúménguān; Japanese: 無門関 Mumonkan).

== Early life and education ==
Wumen was born in Hangzhou. His first master was Gong Heshang. Wumen received his spiritual education, also called Dharma transmission in Buddhist teaching, in the Linji line (Japanese: Rinzai) of Zen from Zen master Yuelin Shiguan (月林師觀; Japanese: Gatsurin Shikan) (1143–1217). Yuelin gave Wumen the koan, a spiritual question, of "Zhaozhou’s dog", with which Wumen struggled for six years before he attained realization. After Yuelin confirmed Wumen‘s understanding of it, Wumen wrote his enlightenment poem:

A thunderclap under the clear blue sky
All beings on earth open their eyes;
Everything under heaven bows together;
Mount Sumeru leaps up and dances.

== Career ==
In many respects, Wumen was the classical eccentric Chan/Zen master. He wandered from temple to temple for many years, wore old and dirty robes, grew his hair and beard long and worked in the temple fields. He was nicknamed "Huikai the Lay Monk". Wumen compiled and commentated the 48-koan collection The Gateless Barrier when he was the head monk of Longxiang (Wade-Giles: Lung-hsiang; Japanese: Ryusho) monastery.

At age 64, he founded Huguo Renwang Temple (護國仁王寺) temple near West Lake where he hoped to retire quietly, but visitors constantly came looking for instruction.

== Work ==
His teachings, as revealed in his comments in Gate of Emptiness, closely followed those of Dahui Zonggao (大慧宗杲; Wade-Giles: Ta-hui Tsung-kao; Japanese: Daei Sōkō) (1089–1163). The importance of "Great Doubt" was one of his central teaching devices. Wumen said, "...[understanding Zen is] just a matter of rousing the mass of doubt throughout your body, day and night, and never letting up." In his comment on Case 1, Zhaozhou's dog, he called wu (無) "a red-hot iron ball which you have gulped down and which you try to vomit up, but cannot".

Wumen believed in blocking all avenues of escape for the student, hence the "gateless barrier". Whatever activity a student proposed, Wumen rejected: "If you follow regulations, keeping the rules, you tie yourself without rope, but if you act any which way without inhibition you're a heretical demon. ... Clear alertness is wearing chains and stocks. Thinking good and bad is hell and heaven. ... Neither progressing nor retreating, you're a dead man with breath. So tell me, ultimately how do you practice?"
