= Dongshan Shouchu =

- Title: Ch'an-shih

Personal life
- Born: Unknown China
- Died: 900

Religious life
- Religion: Buddhism
- School: Ch'an

Senior posting
- Predecessor: Yunmen Wenyan

Dongshan Shouchu (Chinese: 洞山守初; Wade–Giles: Tung-shan Shou-ch'u; Japanese: Tozan Shusho) (died 900) was a Chinese Chan/Zen teacher and an heir to Yunmen Wenyan. Dongshan is the subject of Case 18 "Three Pounds of Flax" in The Gateless Barrier, a collection of koans authored by the Chan master Wumen Huikai in 1228.
