= Qingliang Wenyi =

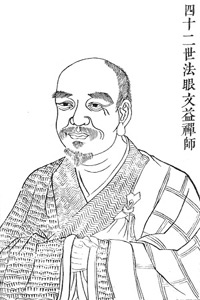
Fayan Wenyi

Qingliang Wenyi (Chinese: 清涼文益), also known as Fayan Wenyi (Chinese: 法眼文益) is a Chinese Buddhist monk in the early 10th century. Wenyi was born in Yuhang (modern Hangzhou, Zhejiang). His secular surname is Lu. He is the founder of the Fayan school of Chan.

== Life ==
Wenyi became a Buddhist monk by the age of 7. His first tutor was Quanwei Chanbo. He followed monk Xijue to the Ashoka temple of Mingzhou (modern Ningbo, Zhejiang) where Xijue and Wenyi preached. He then traveled to the southern port city of Fuzhou in search of the solution of his doubts on the subject of Chan. In Fuzhou, Wenyi's knowledge gained him much popularity. However, he was not content with himself and thought that he had not detached himself from the secular world. His departure from Fuzhou eventually led him to Linchuan. The tradition of Chan Buddhism holds that it was during this particular trip, Wenyi acquired great insight (頓悟). Knowing that Wenyi is an accomplished Chan philosopher, the king of Nan Tang which ruled over the Linchuan region appointed a temple under his guidance. He would remain in the kingdom of Nan Tang for the rest of his life, promulgating the way of Chan. Wenyi died in the year 958. The King of Nan Tang ordered his royal subjects to wear white clothes for the mourning of Wenyi's death. A pagoda was built in Danyang in honor of Wenyi's spiritual accomplishments. His posthumous title "Chan master Dafayan"(大法眼禪師) was then granted.

== Legacy ==
Wenyi is sometimes referred as Fayan Wenyi for his status as the founder of Fayan school of Chan. The Fayan school was listed as one of the five major schools of Chan Buddhism. Some of his pupils such as Tiantai Deshao, the patriarch of the Kingdom of Wuyue, Wensui, the Patriarch of Jiangnan, and Huiju, Patriarch of Korea made major contributions to the promotion of Chan Buddhism in different regions of China and Korea.
