= Yunmen Wenyan =

Chinese Chan Buddhist master

Yúnmén Wényǎn
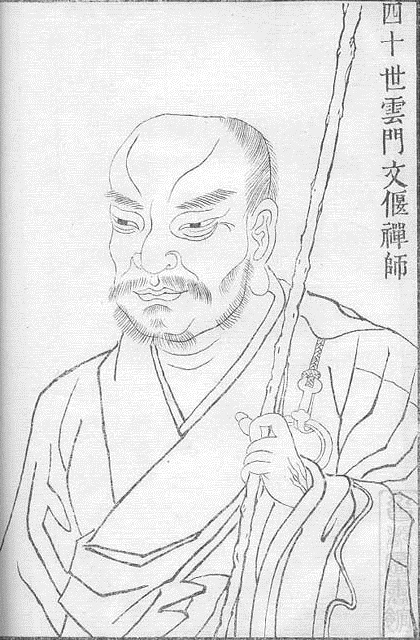
- Title: Ch'an-shih

Personal life
- Born: 862 or 864 Jiaxing, Tang dynasty
- Died: 949 Yunmen Temple, Guangdong, Southern Han

Religious life
- Religion: Buddhism
- School: Ch'an

Yunmen Wenyan

Chinese name
- Traditional Chinese: 雲門文偃
- Simplified Chinese: 云门文偃
Transcriptions
Standard Mandarin
- Hanyu Pinyin: Yúnmén Wényǎn
- Wade–Giles: Yün^{2}-men^{2} Wen^{2}-yen^{3}
- IPA: [y̌n.mə̌n wə̌n.jɛ̀n]
Yue: Cantonese
- Yale Romanization: Wàhn-mùhn Màhn-yín
- Jyutping: Wan4-mun4 Man4-jin2

Japanese name
- Kanji: 雲門文偃
Transcriptions
- Romanization: Ummon Bun'en

Yunmen Wenyan (Chinese: 雲門文偃; Japanese: Ummon Bun'en; 862 or 864 – 949 CE), was a major Chinese Chan master (Note: "Yun-men Wen-yen (864–949) was one of the most eminent Zen personalities of his time." pg 230, Dumoulin 1994.) of the Tang dynasty. He was a dharma-heir of Xuefeng Yicun. (Note: Or Hsueh-feng I-ts'un; Japanese: Seppo Gison) (Note: Another famous disciple of Yicun would be Fa-yen Wen-i (885–958)) (822–908), for whom Yunmen had served as a head monk.)

Yunmen founded the Yunmen school, one of the five major schools of Chán (Chinese Zen). The name is derived from Yunmen monastery of Shaozhou where Yunmen was abbot. The Yunmen school flourished into the early Song Dynasty, with particular influence on the upper classes, and eventually culminating in the compilation and writing of the Blue Cliff Record.

The school would eventually be absorbed by the Linji school later in the Song. The lineage still lives on to this day through Chan Master Xuyun (1840–1959).

== Biography ==
=== Early years ===
Yunmen was born in the town of Jiaxing near Suzhou and southwest of Shanghai to the Zhang family (Note: Later as a monk he would take the name Wenyan; to avoid confusion he will be referred to by his later name of "Yunmen"), apparently in 864 CE. His birth year is uncertain. The two memorial stele at the Yunmen monastery states he was 86 years old when he died in 949 CE, which suggests that he was born in 864 CE.

=== Initial Zen-studies ===
While a boy, Yunmen became a monk under a "Commandment master" (Note: As Miura and Sasaki describe it, "Commandment master" is an unfortunate label borrowed from Christianity and is a misnomer. There are no "commandments" from God or Buddha in Buddhism. "Commandment master" usually refers to a specialist in vinaya: monastic rules and discipline. Sørensen mentions that some sources say that Chih-Ch'eng/Zhi Cheng was actually a Ch'an master) named Zhicheng in Jiaxing. He studied there for several years, taking his monastic vows at age 20, in 883 CE.

The teachings there did not satisfy him, and he went to the school of Reverend Muzhou Daoming (Chinese: 睦州道明; Pinyin: Mùzhōu Dàomíng), also known as Muzhou Daozong (Chinese: 睦州道蹤; Pinyin: Mùzhōu Dàozōng) (Note: also known as Bokushu, Reverend Chen, Muzhou Daozong, Ch'en Tsun-su, Mu-chou Tao-tsung, Tao-ming, Muzhou Daoming etc.; "an eccentric disciple of Huang-po" who practiced an extremely rigorous form of Zen in Mu-chou, after which place he was named) to gain enlightenment. According to legend, first mentioned in 1100, he had his leg broken for his trouble:

Yunmen went to Muzhou's temple to seek Chan. The first time he went, he was not admitted. The second time he went, he was not admitted. The third time he went the gate was opened slightly by Muzhou, and thus Yunmen stuck his leg in attempting to gain entrance. Muzhou urged him to "Speak! Speak!"; as Yunmen opened his mouth, Muzhou pushed him out and slammed shut the large gate so swiftly that Yunmen's leg was caught and was broken.

Daoming told Yunmen to visit the pre-eminent Chan master of the day, Xuefeng Yicun of Mount Xianggu, in Fuzhou in modern-day Fujian Province, and become his disciple, as Daoming was by then too old (~100 years old) to further teach Yunmen. After a few years studying with him, Yunmen did so, and received enlightenment after several years.

=== Advanced Zen-studies ===
While Yunmen had received his teacher's seal of approval, he nevertheless did not become abbot, probably because he had only stayed there for 4 or 5 years. When Xuefeng Yicun died, Yunmen began travelling and visited quite a number of monasteries, cementing his reputation as a Chan master.

During a subsequent visit to the tomb of the Sixth Patriarch in Guangdong, Yunmen eventually joined (c. 911 CE) the monastery of Rumin Chanshi/Ling-shu Ju-min, who died in 918 CE. They became great friends. With his death, Yunmen became head priest of the Lingshu monastery on Mount Lingshu.

In this Five Dynasties and Ten Kingdoms period, the Tang dynasty was greatly weakened, and entire sections of the empire had broken away. The South was peaceful and developed, but the "North was torn by the ravages of war". The area of Southern China where Yunmen lived broke free during the rebellion of Huang Chao, a viceroy of the Liu family. Eventually, the Liu family became the rulers of the Southern Han (918–978) kingdom during the Five Dynasties and Ten Kingdoms period. The ruler, Liu Yan, visited the monastery for Rumin's cremation (as Liu often sought Rumin's advice), and met Yunmen.

=== Abbot of Yunmen monastery ===
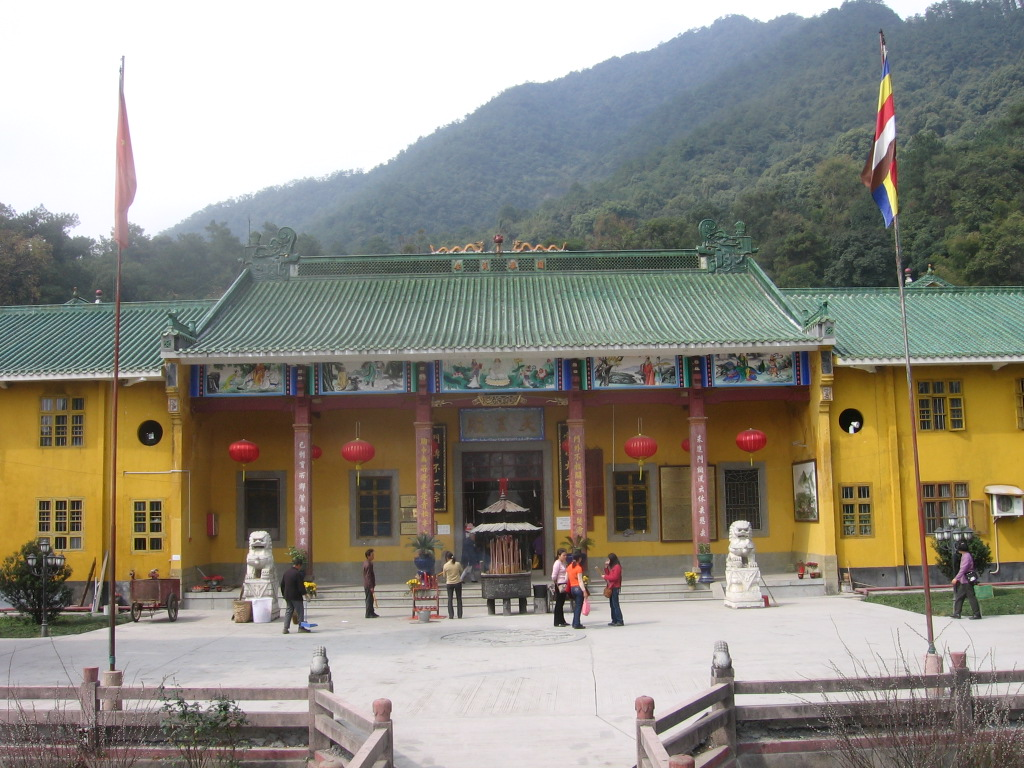
The front of the modern day Yunmen monastery.

Impressed, Liu Yan extended him his patronage and protection, as well as confirming his appointment as the new abbot of the Lingshu monastery. But Yunmen's fame drew a great flow of visitors from all over China and even from Korea. All these visitors proved too distracting for Yunmen's taste, and in 923, he asked the king (Note: Liu Yan having died by this time) to aid him in building a new monastery on Mount Yunmen. The king acquiesced, and five years later, at the age of 64, Yunmen began living in and teaching in the monastery on the mountain from which he took the name by which he is best known.

While the king and some of Yunmen's disciples continued to try to give Yunmen more responsibilities and honors, Yunmen refused, and returned to his monastery.

=== Farewell ===
One day, when Yunmen was 85 or 86, he composed a farewell letter to his patron, the new king of the Southern Han, and gave a final lecture to his monks, finishing with the statement:

Coming and going is continuous. I must be on my way!

Yunmen then (Note: reputedly, in great pain because of his crippled leg) sat in a full lotus posture and died. He would be buried with great honors (Note: but not as great as the state would have liked, as befitted a great master and spiritual minister of the state), and his well-preserved corpse was exhumed several years later, and given a procession. In honor of this, his monastery was given a new name, and two stele erected, which recorded his biography. His corpse would be venerated until the 20th century, when it would disappear during the chaos of the Cultural Revolution.

Yunmen was succeeded as abbot by Dongshan Shouchu (Chinese: 洞山守初; Pinyin: Dòngshān Shǒuchū; Rōmaji: Tōzan Shusho; d. 900). His foremost disciple was accounted Baiyun Zixiang (Chinese: 白雲子祥; Pinyin: Báiyún Zixiáng), who had founded his own temple on the nearby Mount Baiyun.

== Teachings ==
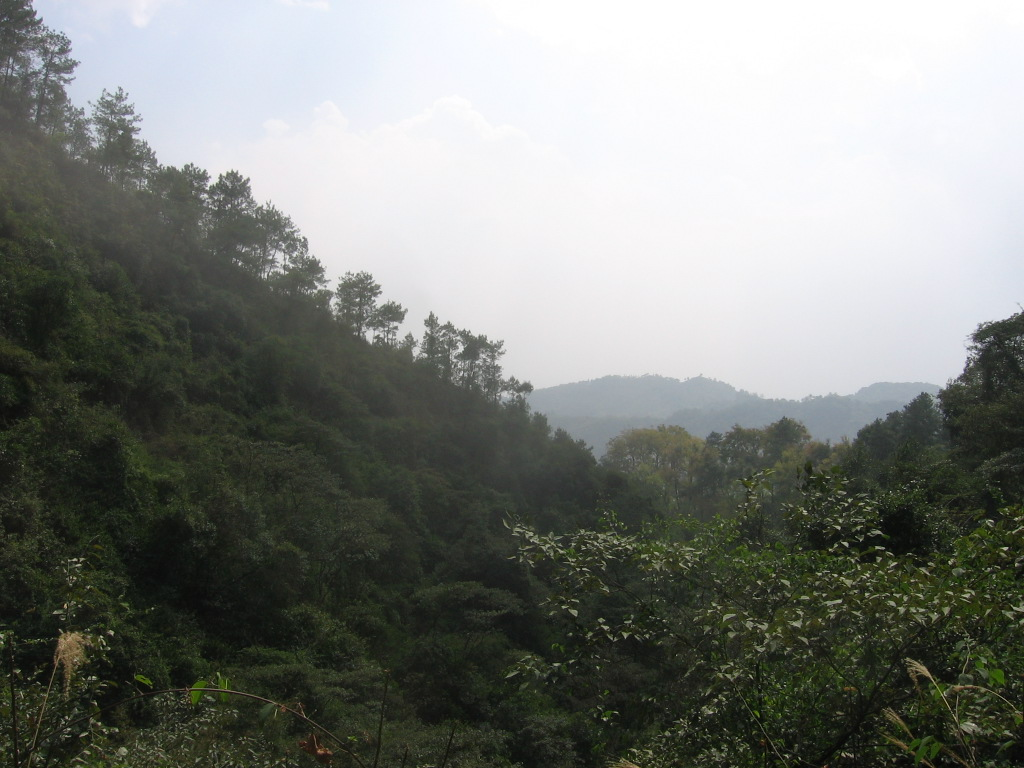
Yunmen mountain. How steep is Yün-mên's mountain! How low the white clouds hang! The mountain stream rushes so swiftly That fish cannot venture to stay. One's coming is well-understood From the moment one steps in the door. Why should I speak of the dust On the track that is worn by the wheel? — Yun-men, from the Jingde Chuandeng Lu 《景德傳燈錄》

Yunmen was renowned for his forceful and direct yet subtle teaching, often expressed through sudden shouts and blows with a staff, and for his wisdom and skill at oratory:

[He was] the most eloquent of the Ch'an masters.

Yet, his teachings are also described as "difficult to understand". According to Gyomay Kubose: "Yunmen's school is deep and difficult to understand since its mode of expression is indirect; while it talks about the south, it is looking at the north."

=== One Word Barriers ===
Yunmen is known for apparently meaningless short sharp single word answers, like "Guan!" (literally, "barrier" or "frontier pass") – these were called "Yunmen's One Word Barriers". These one-word barriers

...were meant to aid practice, to spur insight, and thus to promote realization. Not only his punchy one-syllable retorts, but also his more extended conversation and stories came to be used as koan.

=== Koans ===
An apocryphal anecdote that began circulating around the beginning of the 12th century has Yunmen going so far as to forbid any of his sayings or teachings from being recorded by his many pupils (Note: "What is the good of recording my words and tying up your tongues?" was one of his sayings):

When Master Yunmen expounded the Dharma he was like a cloud. He decidedly did not like people to note down his words. Whenever he saw someone doing this he scolded him and chased him out of the hall with the words, "Because your own mouth is not good for anything you come to note down my words. It is certain that some day you'll sell me!"
As to the records of "Corresponding to the Occasion" (Note: the first chapter of The Record of Yunmen) and "Inside the Master's Room" (Note: the first section of the second chapter of The Record of Yunmen): Xianglin and Mingjiao had fashioned robes out of paper and wrote down immediately whenever they heard them.

Despite this, Yunmen is one of the greatest sources of "live words", "old cases", and paradoxical statements that would later evolve into the koan tradition, along with Zhaozhou (Japanese: Jōshū Jūshin). Most were collected in the Yúnmén kuāngzhēn chánshī guǎnglù (雲門匡眞禪師廣錄).

Eighteen koans in the Blue Cliff Record involve Yunmen:

A monk asked Yunmen (Ummon), "What is the teaching that transcends the Buddha and patriarchs?"

Yunmen (Ummon) said, "A sesame bun."
(From the Blue Cliff Record, case no. 77)

Eight of Yunmen's sayings are included in Book of Equanimity, and five in The Gateless Gate:

A monk asked Yunmen, "What is Buddha?"

Yunmen said, "Dried shitstick."
(From case no. 21, The Gateless Gate)

Eighteen other koans were later discovered when a subsequent master of the Yunmen school, Xuedou Chongxian (Setchō Jūken, 980–1052 CE), published his Boze songgu, which contained one hundred "old cases" popular in his teaching line, in which the eighteen Yunmen koans were included. Further examples can be found in the Jen-t'ien Yen-mu, (Note: Chinese: Jen-t'ien yen-mu, compiled by Hui-yen Chih-chao, a Lin-chi monk. He wrote a history of the Five Houses of Zen Buddhism: Yun-men, Ts'ao-tung, Kuei-yan, and Fa-yen, as well as his own, Lin-chi. See page 214 of Dumoulin 1994.) and the Yün-men Lu. (Note: Ummon Kyōshin zenji kōroku; Chinese: Yün-men K'uang-chen ch'an-shih kuang-lu; shorter: Ummon Ōsho kōroku. The most common abbreviation is just Ummonroku (Chinese: Yün-men lu), though. It was first published in three books in 1076. See page 241 of Dumoulin 1994.)

While his short ones were popular, some of his longer ones were iconic and among the most famous koans:

Yun-men addressed the assembly and said: "I am not asking you about the days before the fifteenth of the month. But what about after the fifteenth? Come and give me a word about those days."
And he himself gave the answer for them: "Every day is a good day."

== Lineage ==
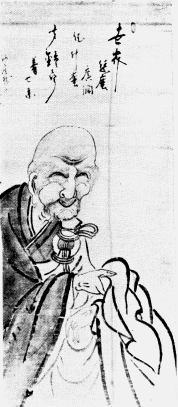
Painting of Yunmen (styled as Ummon Bun'en) by Hakuin Ekaku, c. 18th century, Edo era.

His disciples reputedly numbered 790, an unusual number of whom became enlightened. The Yunmen School flourished as one of the Five Schools for about 300 years, after which it was absorbed into the Linji school towards the end of the Southern Song dynasty (~1127 CE).

The lineage still lives on to this day through Chan Master Xuyun (1840–1959). He rebuilt the Yunmen Temple as well as Huineng's temple, Nanhua Temple. The Yunmen school continues through Master Hsu Yun, Fo Yuan, and Master Ming Zhao Shakya, who have disciples in America and abroad.

== Legacy ==
Despite being a popular place for pilgrimages, the legendary Mount Wutai in Shanxi was ordered off-limits by Yunmen and his dharmic descendent, Linji Yixuan. When the legendary monk Ikkyū was studying under Kaso, he was assigned kōan no. 15 from the Gateless Gate where Yunmen/Ummon rebukes Tozan for wandering from one monastery to another; after being reprimanded, Tozan experiences enlightenment. When Ikkyū 'penetrated' into understanding this kōan, he was rewarded his dharma name.

The Rinzai master Shuho Myocho experienced great enlightenment after contemplating a Yunmen kōan for ten days. After the moment of enlightenment, his master Nanpo Shomyo told him: "Yesterday I dreamed that the great Ummon (Yunmen) personally came to my room. Today, it is you - the second Ummon."

By its preservation in the Blue Cliff Record, Yunmen's famous saying "Nichinichi kore kōnichi" ("Every day is a good day") became a useful phrase for later Zen teachers, including Kōdō Sawaki and his student Taisen Deshimaru. The avant-garde composer John Cage featured the saying in his Song Books as "Solo for Voice 64", specifically as a repetition of “kichi kichi kiri ko nichi”.

The shit stick kōan of Yunmen (case no. 21, The Gateless Gate) became renowned for its incomprehensibility. American Zen teacher Robert Baker Aitken explained that the term was used as "a soft stick that was used the way our ancestors used a corncob in their outhouses" Jack Kerouac paraphrased the kōan in his book The Dharma Bums as "The Buddha is a dried piece of turd." Wumen Huikai appended the kōan with the following verse:

Lightning flashing,
Sparks shooting;
A moment's blinking,
Missed forever.

Yunmen's Japanese name, Ummon, was the namesake for a prominent character in Dan Simmons's Hyperion Cantos science fiction series; Simmon's Ummon was a vastly advanced AI from the "TechnoCore", who reveals key plot elements to the main characters through kōans and mondo (dialogue).

== See also ==
- Jingde (era) Record of the Transmission of the Lamp
- The Gateless Gate
- The Blue Cliff Record

== Sources ==
- App, Urs (1989). Facets of the Life and Teaching of Chan Master Yunmen Wenyan (864–949). Ann Arbor: University Microfilms International.
- App, Urs (1994). Master Yunmen: From the Record of the Chan Master "Gate of the Clouds". New York: Kodansha International. ISBN 978-1-56836-004-1.
- App, Urs (1994). Zen-Worte vom Wolkentor-Berg. Darlegungen und Gespräche des Zen-Meisters Yunmen Wenyan (864–949). Bern / München: Barth. ISBN 978-3-502-64640-2.
- Miura, Isshuu; Sasaki, Ruth Fuller (1967). Zen Dust: The History of the Koan and Koan Study in Rinsai (Lin-Chi) Zen. Harcourt, Brace & World. LCCN 66010044.
- Kubose, Gyomay M. (1973). Zen Koans. Chicago: H. Regnery. ISBN 978-0-8092-9065-9. LCCN 72011183. OCLC 532206.
- Daoyuan, Shi; Zhongyuan Zhang (1971). Original teachings of Ch'an Buddhism: selected from The transmission of the lamp. New York, Toronto: Random House. ISBN 978-0-394-71333-5.
- Sørensen, Henrik Hjort. "The Life and Times of the Ch'an Master Yūn-men Wen-yan", pp. 105–131, Vol. 49 (1996) of Acta orientalia, ISSN 0001-6438
- Dumoulin, Heinrich (1994) [1988]. Zen Buddhism: A History; Volume 1, India and China; With a New Supplement on the Northern School of Chinese Zen. Translated by James W. Heisig, Paul Knitter (Second ed.). New York, NY: Macmillan Reference USA, imprint of Simon & Schuster Macmillan. pp. 387. ISBN 978-0-02-897109-4.
