= Five Houses of Chan =

Major schools of mediaeval Chinese Chan Buddhism

The Five Houses of Chan (also called the Five Houses of Zen) were the five major schools of Chan Buddhism that originated during Tang China. Although at the time they were not considered formal schools or sects of Buddhism, they are now regarded as important schools in the history of Chan Buddhism. Most Chan lineages throughout Asia and the rest of the world originally grew from or were heavily influenced by the original five houses of Chan.

== East Mountain Teaching ==
Huineng tearing sutras

The period of Daoxin (道信 580–651) and Daman Hongren (弘忍 601–674) came to be called the East Mountain Teaching, due to the location of the residence of Hongren at Huamgmei. The term was used by Shenxiu (神秀 606?–706), the most important successor to Hongren.

In 701, Shenxiu was invited to the Imperial Court by Empress Wu, who paid him due imperial reverence. The first lineage documents were produced in this period.

According to tradition, the sixth and last ancestral founder, Huineng (惠能; 638–713), was one of the giants of Chan history, and all surviving schools regard him as their ancestor. Shenhui, a successor to Huineng claimed Huineng to be the successor of Hongren's, instead of the then publicly recognized successor Shenxiu. The most prominent of the successors of Shenhui's lineage was Guifeng Zongmi

Shenhui's influence is traceable in the Platform Sutra, which gives a popular account of the story of Huineng, but also reconciles the antagonism created by Shenhui. Shenhui himself does not figure in the Platform Sutra; he was effectively written out of Chan-history.

From the East Mountain Teachings descend the Five Houses of Chan, via various lineages.

	Predecessors
5	Daman Hongren (601-674)(5th Patriarch) (WG Ta-man Hung-jen, Jpn. Gunin)
6	Yuquan Shenxiu (605?-706) (WG Yü-Ch'uan shen-hsiu, Jpn. Jinshū)	Huineng (638-713) (WG Hui-neng, Jpn. Enō)
7	Northern School	Qingyuan Xingsi (660-740) (WG Ch'ing-yüan Hsing-ssu, Jpn. Seigen Gyōshi)	Nanyue Huairang (677-744) (wg Nan-yüeh Huai-jang, Jpn. Nangaku Ejō)	Heze Shenhui (WG Ho-tse Shen-hui, Jpn. Kataku Jin'e)
8		Shitou Xiqian (700-790) (WG Shih-t'ou Hsi-ch'ien, Jpn. Sekitō Kisen)	Mazu Daoyi (709-788) (WG Ma-tsu Tao-i, Jpn. Baso Dōitsu)	Heze School (WG Ho-tse School, Jpn. Kataku School)
9		Fayan school Yunmen school Caodong school	Hongzhou school Linji school
				Fifth generation: Guifeng Zongmi (780–841) ((圭峰 宗密 WG Kuei-feng Tsung-mi, Jpn. Keihō Shūmitsu)

== The Five Houses ==
The five houses were each defined by a unique method of teaching. Each school's methods were significantly different from the others, though it was not unheard of for teachers from one school to use the methods of another.

=== Guiyang school ===
The Guiyang school (潙仰宗 Guíyáng, Jpn. Igyō) was the first established school of the Five Houses of Zen. Guiyang is named after master Guishan Lingyou (771–854) (Kuei-shan Ling-yu, Jpn. Isan Reiyū) and his student, Yangshan Huiji (807-883, or 813–890) (Yang-shan Hui-chi, Jpn. Kyōzan Ejaku).

Guishan was a disciple of Baizhang Huaihai, the Chinese Zen master whose disciples included Huangbo Xiyun (who in turn taught Línjì Yìxuán, founder of the Linji School). After founding the Guiyang School, Yangshan moved his school to what is now modern Jiangxi.

The Guiyang school is distinct from the other schools due to its use of esoteric metaphors and imagery in the school's kōans and other teachings.

Over the course of Song Dynasty (960–1279), the Guiyang school, along with the Fayan and Yunmen schools were absorbed into the Linji school. Chan master Hsu Yun, however, attempted to revive absorbed lineages. The attempt was successful regarding the Guiyang school, Hsuan Hua being its most known modern representative.

=== Linji school ===
The Linji (Chinese: 临济宗; pinyin: Lín jì zōng, Japanese: Rinzai shū) was named after Chan master Linji Yixuan, who was notable for teaching students in ways that included shouting and striking in an attempt to help students reach enlightenment. The Linji school is the predominant Chinese Chan school.

=== Caodong school ===
The Caodong school was founded by Dongshan Liangjie and his Dharma-heirs in the 9th century. Some attribute the name "Cáodòng" as a union of "Dongshan" and "Caoshan" from one of his Dharma-heirs, Caoshan Benji; however, the "Cao" could also have come from Cáoxī (曹溪), the "mountain-name" of Huineng, the Sixth Ancestor of Chan. The sect emphasized sitting meditation, and later "silent illumination" techniques.

In 826 Korean Seon Master Doui, a student of Sixth Ancestor of Chan Huineng, brought Chan/Seon (Korean Zen) to Korea and founded the "Nine Mountain Seon Monasteries" which adopted the name Jogye order.

In 1227 Dōgen Zenji, a former Tendai student, studied Caodong Buddhism and returned to Japan to establish the Sōtō school. The Caodong school is still extant and is second only to Linji in number of monks and temples.

=== Fayan school ===
The Fayan school (法眼宗) was named after Chinese Chan Master Fayan Wenyi (Fa-yen Wen-i), who lived from 885 to 958.

=== Yunmen school ===
The Yunmen school was named for Yunmen Wenyan. The school thrived into the early Song Dynasty, with particular influence on the upper classes, and culminated in the final compilation of the Blue Cliff Record. Later during the Song Dynasty, the school was absorbed into the Linji school. It lived on into the modern era through Master Hsu Yun (1840–1959).

== The Five Houses during the Song Dynasty ==
Over the course of Song Dynasty (960–1279), the Guiyang, Fayan, and Yunmen houses were gradually absorbed into the Linji house. Caodong was transmitted to Japan in the 13th century from Ven. Rujing of Tiantong Temple to Ven. Dōgen leading to the creation of the Sōtō Zen school.

== Chan in the modern era ==
Both Linji and Caodong are still practiced in China today. Ven. Sheng-yen is an example of a modern Linji and Caodong teacher. Ven. Hsu Yun revived the Guiyang school, Fayan school and the Yunmen school in China.

== See also ==
- Chan Buddhism
- Zen lineage charts

== Sources ==
- Koole, Boudewijn (1997), Dōgen Kigen: De Schatkamer van het Oog van de Ware Leer. Eerste selectie uit de Shōbōgenzō, met toelichtende informatie, Utrecht/Antwerpen: Kosmos-Z&K Uitgevers
