= Zen lineage charts =

Lines of transmission of Zen teachers

Zen lineage charts depict the transmission of the dharma from one generation to another. They developed during the Tang dynasty, incorporating elements from Indian Buddhism and East Asian Mahayana Buddhism, but were first published at the end of the Tang.

== History ==
The idea of a patriarchal lineage in Chan dates back to the epitaph for Fărú (法如 638–689), a disciple of the 5th patriarch, Daman Hongren (弘忍 601–674). In the Long Scroll of the Treatise on the Two Entrances and Four Practices and the Continued Biographies of Eminent Monks, Daoyu and Dazu Huike are the only explicitly identified disciples of Bodhidharma. The epitaph gives a line of descent identifying Bodhidharma as the first patriarch.

In the 6th century biographies of famous monks were collected. From this genre the typical Chan lineage was developed:

These famous biographies were non-sectarian. The Ch'an biographical works, however, aimed to establish Ch'an as a legitimate school of Buddhism traceable to its Indian origins, and at the same time championed a particular form of Ch'an. Historical accuracy was of little concern to the compilers; old legends were repeated, new stories were invented and reiterated until they too became legends.

According to McRae, the schema developed over the course of several centuries. It is a combined product of Indian and Chinese culture, which inherited elements "from the larger tradition of East Asian Mahayana Buddhism" such as the seven Buddhas of the past:

[T]he origins of this lineage-based transmission scheme are to be found in Indian Buddhism and the fourth- and fifth-century Buddhist meditation tradition of Kashmir. There are a number of parallels between the Chan transmission scheme and Chinese family genealogies of the eighth century and later, but we should remember that Indian Buddhists had parents and teachers, family genealogies and initiation lineages, just as the Chinese did. As an amalgamation of Indian and Chinese elements, though, the Chinese transmission schema developed within the Chinese Buddhist context and was particularly well adapted to that milieu.

The complete system was published perhaps as early as 801 but certainly by the year 952.

D. T. Suzuki contends that Chan's growth in popularity during the 7th and 8th centuries attracted criticism that it had "no authorized records of its direct transmission from the founder of Buddhism" and that Chan historians made Bodhidharma the 28th patriarch of Buddhism in response to such attacks.

== Lineages ==
=== The Indian Lineage From Shakyamuni to Bodhidharma ===
The earliest descriptions of the Chán-lineage evolved into a continuous lineage from Śākyamuni Buddha to Bodhidharma. The idea of a line of descent from Śākyamuni Buddha is the basis for the distinctive lineage tradition of the Chán school. The Denkoroku, "Transmission of the Light", written by Keizan, gives 28 patriarchs in this transmission:

	Sanskrit	Chinese	Vietnamese	Japanese	Korean
1	Mahākāśyapa	摩訶迦葉 / Móhējiāyè	Ma-Ha-Ca-Diếp	Makakashō	마하가섭 / Mahagasŏp
2	Ānanda	阿難陀 (阿難) / Ānántuó (Ānán)	A-Nan-Đà (A-Nan)	Ananda Buddha (Anan)	아난다 (아난) / Ananda Buddha (Anan)
3	Śānavāsa	商那和修 / Shāngnàhéxiū	Thương-Na-Hòa-Tu	Shōnawashu	상나화수 / Sangnahwasu
4	Upagupta	優婆掬多 / Yōupójúduō	Ưu-Ba-Cúc-Đa	Ubakikuta	우바국다 / Upakukta
5	Dhrtaka	提多迦 / Dīduōjiā	Đề-Đa-Ca	Daitaka	제다가 / Chedaga
6	Miccaka	彌遮迦 / Mízhējiā	Di-Dá-Ca	Mishaka	미차가 / Michaga
7	Vasumitra	婆須密 (婆須密多) / Póxūmì (Póxūmìduō)	Bà-Tu-Mật (Bà-Tu-Mật-Đa)	Bashumitsu (Bashumitta)	바수밀다 / Pasumilta
8	Buddhanandi	浮陀難提 / Fútuónándī	Phật-Đà-Nan-Đề	Buddanandai	불타난제 / Pŭltananje
9	Buddhamitra	浮陀密多 / Fútuómìduō	Phục-Đà-Mật-Đa	Buddamitta	복태밀다 / Puktaemilda
10	Pārśva	波栗濕縛 / 婆栗濕婆 (脅尊者) / Bōlìshīfú / Pólìshīpó (Xiézūnzhě)	Ba-Lật-Thấp-Phược / Bà-Lật-Thấp-Bà (Hiếp-Tôn-Giả)	Barishiba (Kyōsonja)	파률습박 (협존자) / P'ayulsŭppak (Hyŏpjonje)
11	Punyayaśas	富那夜奢 / Fùnàyèshē	Phú-Na-Dạ-Xa	Funayasha	부나야사 / Punayasa
12	Ānabodhi / Aśvaghoṣa	阿那菩提 (馬鳴) / Ānàpútí (Mǎmíng)	A-Na-Bồ-Đề (Mã-Minh)	Anabotei (Memyō)	아슈바고샤 (마명) / Asyupakosya (Mamyŏng)
13	Kapimala	迦毘摩羅 / Jiāpímóluó	Ca-Tỳ-Ma-La	Kabimora (Kabimara)	가비마라 / Kabimara
14	Nāgārjuna	那伽閼剌樹那 (龍樹) / Nàqiéèlàshùnà (Lóngshù)	Na-Già-Át-Lạt-Thụ-Na (Long-Thọ)	Nagaarajuna (Ryūju)	나가알랄수나 (용수) / Nakaallalsuna (Yongsu)
15	Āryadeva / Kānadeva	迦那提婆 / Jiānàtípó	Ca-Na-Đề-Bà	Kanadaiba	가나제바 / Kanajeba
16	Rāhulata	羅睺羅多 / Luóhóuluóduō	La-Hầu-La-Đa	Ragorata	라후라다 / Rahurada
17	Sanghānandi	僧伽難提 / Sēngqiénántí	Tăng-Già-Nan-Đề	Sōgyanandai	승가난제 / Sŭngsananje
18	Sanghayaśas	僧伽舍多 / Sēngqiéshèduō	Tăng-Già-Da-Xá	Sōgyayasha	가야사다 / Kayasada
19	Kumārata	鳩摩羅多 / Jiūmóluóduō	Cưu-Ma-La-Đa	Kumorata (Kumarata)	구마라다 / Kumarada
20	Śayata / Jayata	闍夜多 / Shéyèduō	Xà-Dạ-Đa	Shayata	사야다 / Sayada
21	Vasubandhu	婆修盤頭 (世親) / Póxiūpántóu (Shìqīn)	Bà-Tu-Bàn-Đầu (Thế-Thân)	Bashubanzu (Sejin)	바수반두 (세친) / Pasubandu (Sechin)
22	Manorhitajuna	摩拏羅 / Mónáluó	Ma-Noa-La	Manura	마나라 / Manara
23	Haklenayaśas	鶴勒那 (鶴勒那夜奢) / Hèlènà (Hèlènàyèzhě)	Hạc-Lặc-Na	Kakurokuna (Kakurokunayasha)	학륵나 / Haklŭkna
24	Simhabodhi	師子菩提 / Shīzǐpútí	Sư-Tử-Bồ-Đề / Sư-Tử-Trí	Shishibodai	사자 / Saja
25	Vasiasita	婆舍斯多 / Póshèsīduō	Bà-Xá-Tư-Đa	Bashashita	바사사다 / Pasasada
26	Punyamitra	不如密多 / Bùrúmìduō	Bất-Như-Mật-Đa	Funyomitta	불여밀다 / Punyŏmilta
27	Prajñātāra	般若多羅 / Bōrěduōluó	Bát-Nhã-Đa-La	Hannyatara	반야다라 / Panyadara
28	Dharmayana / Bodhidharma	Ta Mo / 菩提達磨	Đạt-Ma / Bồ-Đề-Đạt-Ma	Daruma / Bodaidaruma	Tal Ma /보리달마 / Poridalma]

=== The First Six Ancestors of the Chinese Lineage ===
The earliest lineages described the lineage from Bodhidharma to Huineng. There is no generally accepted 7th Chinese Patriarch. (Note: 禪宗第七祖之爭的文獻研究)

The principle teachers of the Chan, Seon and Zen traditions are commonly known in the first English translations as Patriarchs; however, the current trend is to use the more precise terminology of "Ancestors" or "Founders" (祖) and "Ancestral Masters" or "Founding Masters" (祖師) as the original terms are gender neutral. Various records of different authors are known, which give a variation of transmission lines:

	The Continued Biographies of Eminent Monks; Xù gāosēng zhuàn 續高僧傳 of Dàoxuān 道宣 (596-667)	The Record of the Transmission of the Dharma-Jewel; Chuán fǎbǎo jì 傳法寶記 of Dù Fěi 杜胐	History of Masters and Disciples of the Laṅkāvatāra-Sūtra; Léngqié shīzī jì 楞伽師資紀記 of Jìngjué 淨覺 (ca. 683 - ca. 650)	The Xiǎnzōngjì 显宗记 of Shénhuì 神会
1	Bodhidharma	Bodhidharma	Bodhidharma	Bodhidharma
2	Huìkě 慧可 (487? - 593)	Dàoyù 道育	Dàoyù 道育	Dàoyù 道育
2	Huìkě 慧可 (487? - 593)	Huìkě 慧可 (487? - 593)	Huìkě 慧可 (487? - 593)	Huìkě 慧可 (487? - 593)
3	Sēngcàn 僧璨 (d.606)	Sēngcàn 僧璨 (d.606)	Sēngcàn 僧璨 (d.606)	Sēngcàn 僧璨 (d.606)
4	Dàoxìn 道信 (580 - 651)	Dàoxìn 道信 (580 - 651)	Dàoxìn 道信 (580 - 651)	Dàoxìn 道信 (580 - 651)
5	Hóngrěn 弘忍 (601 - 674)	Hóngrěn 弘忍 (601 - 674)	Hóngrěn 弘忍 (601 - 674)	Hóngrěn 弘忍 (601 - 674)
6	-	Fǎrú 法如 (638-689)	Yuquan Shenxiu 神秀 (606? - 706)	Huìnéng 慧能 (638-713)
6	-	Yuquan Shenxiu 神秀 (606? - 706) 神秀	Xuánzé 玄賾	Huìnéng 慧能 (638-713)
7	-	-	-	Xuánjué 玄覺 (665-713)

=== Tang dynasty ===
==== Hongren - Huineng - Northern School - Shitou-lineage - Mazu-lineage - Southern School ====
Huineng tearing sutras

The period of Dayi Daoxin (道信 580–651) and Daman Hongren (弘忍 601–674) came to be called the East Mountain Teaching, due to the location of the residence of Hongren at Huamgmei. The term was used by Yuquan Shenxiu, the most important successor to Hongren.

Yuquan Shenxiu (神秀 606?-706) was the most important successor to Daman Hongren. In 701 he was invited to the Imperial Court by Wu Zetian, who paid him due imperial reverence. The first lineage documents were produced in this period.

According to tradition, the sixth and last ancestral founder, Huineng (惠能; 638–713), was one of the giants of Chan history, and all surviving schools regard him as their ancestor.

Shenhui, a successor to Huineng, claimed Huineng to be the successor of Hongren instead of the publicly recognized successor Yuquan Shenxiu. The most prominent of the successors of Shenhui's lineage was Guifeng Zongmi Shenhui's influence is traceable in the Platform Sutra, which gives a popular account of the story of Huineng, but also reconciles the antagonism created by Shenhui. Shenhui himself does not figure in the Platform Sutra; he was effectively written out of Chan history.

	Predecessors
5	Daman Hongren (601-674)(5th Patriarch) (WG Ta-man Hung-jen, Jpn. Gunin)
6	Yuquan Shenxiu (605?-706) (WG Yü-Ch'uan shen-hsiu, Jpn. Jinshū)	Huineng (638-713) (WG Hui-neng, Jpn. Enō)
7	Northern School	Qingyuan Xingsi (660-740) (WG Ch'ing-yüan Hsing-ssu, Jpn. Seigen Gyōshi)	Nanyue Huairang (677-744) (wg Nan-yüeh Huai-jang, Jpn. Nangaku Ejō)	Heze Shenhui (WG Ho-tse Shen-hui, Jpn. Kataku Jin'e)
8		Shitou Xiqian (700-790) (WG Shih-t'ou Hsi-ch'ien, Jpn. Sekitō Kisen)	Mazu Daoyi (709-788) (WG Ma-tsu Tao-i, Jpn. Baso Dōitsu)	Heze School (WG Ho-tse School, Jpn. Kataku School)
9		Fayan school Yunmen school Caodong school	Hongzhou school Linji school
				Fifth generation: Guifeng Zongmi (780–841) ((圭峰 宗密 WG Kuei-feng Tsung-mi, Jpn. Keihō Shūmitsu)

==== Shitou Xiqian - Fayan School - Yunmen school - Caodong/Soto school ====
The details of Shítóu's life are found in traditional biographies. Scholar Mario Poceski writes that Shítóu does not appear to have been influential or famous during his lifetime. Sayings to the effect that Shitou and Mazu Daoyi were the two great masters of their day date from decades after their respective deaths. Shítóu's retrospective prominence owes much to the importance of Dongshan Liangjie, a 9th-century teacher who traced his lineage back to Shítóu.

	Six Patriarchs
	Huineng (638-713) (WG: Hui-neng. Jpn: Enō)
	Qingyuan Xingsi (660-740) (WG: TCh'ing yüan Hsing-ssu. Jpn: Seigen Gyōshi)
0	Shitou Xiqian (700-790) (WG: Shih-t'ou Hsi-ch'ien. Jpn: Sekitō Kisen)
1	Tianhuang Daowu (748-807) (WG: T'ien-huang Tao-wu. Jpn: Tennō Dago)		Yaoshan Weiyan (ca.745-828) (Yao-shan Wei-yen, Jpn. Yakusan Igen)
2	Longtan Chongxin (8th/9th century) (WG: Lung-t'an Ch'ung-hsin; Jpn: Ryūtan Sōshin)		Yunyan Tansheng (780-841) (Yün-yen T'an-shen, Jpn. Ungan Donjō)
3	Deshan Xuanjian (782-865) (WG: Te-shan Hsüan-chien; Jpn: Tokusan Senkan)		Dongshan Liangjie (807-869); Tung-shan liang-chieh, Jpn. Tōzan Ryōkai)
4	Xuefeng Yicun (822-908)(雪峰 义 存) (WG: Hsüeh-feng I-ts'un. Jpn: Seppō Gison)		Caoshan Benji (840-901) (Ts'ao-shan Pen-chi, Jpn. Sōzan Honjaku)	Yunju Daoying (d.902) (Yün-chü Tao-ying, Jpn. Ungo Dōyō)
5	Jingqing Daotu (ca.863-937) (WG: Ching-ch'ing Tao-fu. Jpn: Kyōsei Dōfu)	Yunmen Wenyan (864-949) (WG: Yün-men Wen-yen. Jpn: Ummon Bun'en)	Caodong school	8 generations
6	Xuansha Shibei (835-908)	Dongshan Shouchu (910-990)		Dōgen
7	Luohan Guichen (867-928)	Yunmen school		Sōtō
8	Fayan Wenyi (885-958)
9	Fayan school

==== Mazu - Hongzhou school - Guiyang school - Linji school ====
Traditionally, Mazu Daoyi is depicted as a successor in the lineage of Huineng, since his teacher Nanyue Huairang is regarded as a student and successor of Huineng. This connection between Huineng and Nanyue Huairang is doubtful, being the product of later rewritings of Chan history to place Mazu Daoyi in the traditional lineages.

Mazu Daoyi is perhaps the most influential teaching master in the formation of Chan Buddhism. While Chan became the dominant school of Buddhism during the Song dynasty, the later Tang dynasty and Mazu Daoyi's Hongzhou school became regarded as the "golden age" of Chan. The An Lushan Rebellion (755-763) led to a loss of control by the Tang dynasty, and metropolitan Chan began to lose its status while "other schools were arising in outlying areas controlled by warlords. These are the forerunnersof the Chan we know today. Their origins are obscure; the power of Shen-hui's preaching is shown by the fact that they all trace themselves to Hui-neng."

Six Patriarchs
Huineng (638-713) (Hui-neng, Jpn. Enō)
Nanyue Huairang (677-744) (Nan-yüeh Huai-jang, Jpn. Nangaku Ejō))
Mazu Daoyi (709-788) (Ma-tsu Tao-i, Jpn. Baso Dōitsu)
Nanquan Puyuan (748-835) (Nan-ch'üan p'u-yüan, Jpn. Nansen Fugan)	Baizhang Huaihai (720-814) (Pai-chang Huai-hai, Jpn. Hyakujō Ekai)
Zhaozhou Congshen (778--879) (Chao-chou Ts'ung-shen, Jpn. Jōshū Jūshin)	Huangbo Xiyun (d.850) (Huang-po Hsi-yüan, Jpn. Ōbaku Kiun)	Guishan Lingyou (771-853) (Kuei-shan Ling-yu, Jpn. Isan Reiyū)
	Linji Yixuan (d.866) (Lin-chi I-hsüan, Jpn. Rinzai Gigen)	Guiyang school
	Linji school

=== Song dynasty - The Five Houses of Chán ===
During the Song the Five Houses (Ch. 五家) of Chán, or five "schools", were recognized. These were not originally regarded as "schools" or "sects", but based on the various Chán-genealogies. Historically they have come to be understood as "schools".

The Five Houses of Chán are:

- Guiyang school (潙仰宗), named after masters Guishan Lingyou (771–854) and Yangshan Huiji (813–890), dharma-descendants of Mazu Daoyi;
- Linji school (臨濟宗), named after master Linji Yixuan (died 866), whose lineage came to be traced back to Mazu, establishing him as the archetypal iconoclastic Chán-master;
- Caodong school (曹洞宗), named after masters Dongshan Liangjie (807–869) and Caoshan Benji (840–901);
- Yunmen school (雲門宗), named after master Yunmen Wenyan (died 949), a student of Xuefeng Yicun (822-908), whose lineage was traced back to Shitou Xiqian:
- Fayan school (法眼宗), named after master Fayan Wenyi (885–958), a "grand-student" of Xuefeng Yicun.

==== Guiyang school ====
The Guiyang school (潙仰宗 Guíyáng, Jpn. Igyō) was the first established school of the Five Houses of Zen. Guiyang is named after master Guishan Lingyou (771–854) (Kuei-shan Ling-yu, Jpn. Isan Reiyū) and his student, Yangshan Huiji (807-883, or 813–890) (Yang-shan Hui-chi, Jpn. Kyōzan Ejaku). After founding the Guiyang School, Yangshan moved his school to what is now modern Jiangxi.

The Guiyang school was distinct from the other schools due to its use of esoteric metaphors and imagery in the school's kōans and other teachings.

Six Patriarchs
Huineng (638-713)
(Hui-neng, Jpn. Enō)
Nanyue Huairang (677-744)
(Nan-yüeh Huai-jang, Jpn. Nangaku Ejō))
Mazu Daoyi (709-788)
(Ma-tsu Tao-i, Jpn. Baso Dōitsu)
Baizhang Huaihai (720-814)
(Pai-chang Huai-hai, Jpn. Hyakujō Ekai)
Guishan Lingyou (771-853)
(Kuei-shan Ling-yu, Jpn. Isan Reiyū)
Yangshan Huiji (807-883)
(Yang-shan Hui-chi, Jpn. Kyōzan Ejaku)
Guiyang school

==== Fayan school and Yunmen school ====
Via Xuefeng Yicun the Fayang school and Yunmen school are traced back to Shitou Xiqian and Huineng. Xuefeng was one of the most influential Chán-teachers at the end of the Tang dynasty, when "a widely influential zen center formed around Xuefeng Yicun". The loss of control by the Tang dynasty, and the accompanying loss of support for Buddhist institutions, lead to a regionally based Chan of Xuefeng and his students.

The Zutang ji (祖堂集 "Anthology of the Patriarchal Hall), compiled in 952, the first document which mentions Linji Yixuan, was written to support the Xuefeng Yicun lineage. It pictures this lineage as heir to the legacy of Mazu and the Hongzhou-school, though Xuefeng Yicun's lineage is traced back to Shitou Xiqian (700-790). It was written by two students of Zhaoqing Wendeng (884-972), a dharma descendant of Xuefeng Yicun.

	Six Patriarchs
	Huineng (638–713) (WG: Hui-neng. Jpn: Enō)
	Qingyuan Xingsi (660–740) (WG: TCh'ing yüan Hsing-ssu. Jpn: Seigen Gyōshi)
	Shitou Xiqian (700–790) (WG: Shih-t'ou Hsi-ch'ien. Jpn: Sekitō Kisen)
	Tianhuang Daowu (748–807) (WG: T'ien-huang Tao-wu. Jpn: Tennō Dago)
	Longtan Chongxin (8th/9th century) (WG: Lung-t'an Ch'ung-hsin; Jpn: Ryūtan Sōshin)
	Deshan Xuanjian (782–865) (WG: Te-shan Hsüan-chien; Jpn: Tokusan Senkan)
0	Xuefeng Yicun (822–908)(雪峰 义 存) (WG: Hsüeh-feng I-ts'un. Jpn: Seppō Gison)
1	Jingqing Daotu (ca.863–937) (WG: Ching-ch'ing Tao-fu. Jpn: Kyōsei Dōfu)	Yunmen Wenyan (864–949) (WG: Yün-men Wen-yen. Jpn: Ummon Bun'en)
2	Xuansha Shibei (835–908)	Dongshan Shouchu (910–990)
3	Luohan Guichen (867–928)	Yunmen school
4	Fayan Wenyi (885–958)
	Fayan school

==== Linji school ====
During the Northern Song (960–1127), the Song capital was in the northern city of Bianjing (now Kaifeng) and the dynasty controlled most of inner China. The Fayan school was the first faction to gain recognition at the Song court, due to the influence of the buddhist scholar-official Zanning (919-1001). After his death this position was taken over by the linji-faction.

The linji-school of the Song dynasty brought together the classical elements of Zen:

- The denlu-genre, the "Transmission of the Lamp";
- The yulu-genre, the recorded sayings of the masters of the Tang;
- The gongan (koan) collections, describing fictiounous dialogues and interactions between masters and students, supplemented with introductions, commentary and poetry;
- The Hua Tou practice, the meditative concentration on the "word-head" of a gongan as an aid in attaining kensho;
- The notion of "a special transmission outside the scripture" as one of the defining characteristics of Zen.

All of these elements, which shaped the picture of the iconoclastic Zen-master who transmits a wordless truth, were shaped by and dependent on literary products that shaped the Traditional Zen Narrative which furthered the position of the Linji-school. This narrative did not describe the actual Chán-practice, neither of the Song-dynasty, nor of the Tang dynasty.

According to Welter, the real founder of the Linji-school was Shoushan (or Baoying) Shengnian (首山省念) (926-993), a fourth generation dharma-heir of Linji. The Tiansheng Guangdeng lu (天聖廣燈錄), "Tiansheng Era Expanded Lamp Record", compiled by the official Li Zunxu (李遵勗) (988-1038) confirms the status of Shoushan Shengnian, but also pictures Linji as a major Chan patriarch and heir to the Hongzhou school of Mazu Daoyi, displacing the prominence of the Fayan-lineage. It also established the slogan of "a special transmission outside the teaching", supporting the Linji-school claim of "Chan as separate from and superior to all other Buddhist teachings".

Six Patriarchs
Huineng (638-713) (Hui-neng, Jpn. Enō)
Nanyue Huairang (677-744) (Nan-yüeh Huai-jang, Jpn. Nangaku Ejō))
Mazu Daoyi (709-788) (Ma-tsu Tao-i, Jpn. Baso Dōitsu)
Baizhang Huaihai (720-814) (Pai-chang Huai-hai, Jpn. Hyakujō Ekai)
Huangbo Xiyun (d.850) (Huang-po Hsi-yüan, Jpn. Ōbaku Kiun)
Linji Yixuan (d.866) (Lin-chi I-hsüan, Jpn. Rinzai Gigen)
Xinghua Cunjiang
Nanyuan Huiyong
Shoushan Xingnian
Fenyang Shanzhao
Shishuang Chuyuan
Yangqi Fanghui			Huanglong Huinan
Baiyun Shouduan			Hui-t'ang Tsu-hsin
Wuzu Fayan			Ssu-hsin W-hsin
Kaifu Daoning	Yuanwu Keqin		Several generations
Yue'an Shanguo	Hu-ch'iu Shao-lung	Dahui Zonggao	Eisai
Lao-na Tsu-teng	Ying-an T'an-hua
Yüeh-lin Shih-kuan	Mi-an Hsien-chieh
Wu-men Hui-k'ai	Sung-yüan Ch'ung-yüeh
Shinchi Kakushin	Rinzai school
	Hakuin
	Rinzai school

==== Caodong school ====
The Caodong school was founded by Dongshan Liangjie and his Dharma-heirs in the 9th century.

Six Patriarchs

Huineng (638-713)
(WG: Hui-neng. Jpn: Enō)

Qingyuan Xingsi (660-740)
(WG: Tch'ing yüan Hsing-ssu. Jpn: Seigen Gyōshi)

Shitou Xiqian (700-790)
(WG: Shih-t'ou Hsi-ch'ien. Jpn: Sekitō Kisen)

Yaoshan Weiyan (ca.745-828)
(Yao-shan Wei-yen, Jpn. Yakusan Igen)

Yunyan Tansheng (780-841)
(Yün-yen T'an-shen, Jpn. Ungan Donjō)
Linji lineage
Linji school
0
Dongshan Liangjie (807-869)
Tung-shan liang-chieh, Jpn. Tōzan Ryōkai)
Linji Yixuan
1
Caoshan Benji (840-901)
(Ts'ao-shan Pen-chi, Jpn. Sōzan Honjaku)
Yunju Daoying (d.902)
(Yün-chü Tao-ying, Jpn. Ungo Dōyō)
Xinghua Cunjiang
2

Tongan Daopi (Daopi)
Nanyuan Huiyong
3

Tongan Guanzhi (Tongan)
Fengxue Yanzhao
4

Liangshan Yuanguan
Shoushan Xingnian
5

Dayang Jingxuan (942-1027) (Dayang)
Shexian Guixing

Fushan Fayuan (Rinzai-master))
6

Touzi Yiqing (1032-1083) (Touzi)

7

Furong Daokai (1043-1118) (Daokai)

8

Lumen Zijue (d.1117)
Danxia Zichun (1064-1117) (Danxia)

9

Puzhao Yibian (1081-1149)
Hongzhi Zhengjue (1091-1157)

Zhenxie Qingliao (Wukong)

10

Lingyan Sengbao (1114-1171)
Tiantong Zongjue (Zongjue)

11

Yushan Shiti
Xuedou Zhijian (Zhijian)

12

Xueyan Huiman (d.1206)
Tiantong Rujing (Rujing)

13

Wansong Xingxiu (1166-1246)
Dōgen

14

Xueting Fuyu (1203-1275)
Soto-lineage

Soto school

15

Lingyin Wentai (d.1289)

16

Huanyuan Fuyu (1245-1313)

17

Chunzuo Wencai (1273-1352)

18

Songting Ziyan

19

Ningran Liaogai (1335-1421)

20

Jukong Qibin (1383-1452)

21

Wufang Kecong (1420-1483)

22

Yuezhou Wenzai (1452-1524)

23

Zongjing Zongshu (1500-1567)

24

Huanxiu Changrun (d.1585)

25

Cizhou Fangnian (d.1594)

26

Yunmen Yuancheng (1561-1626)

27

Ruibai Mingxue (1584-1641)

28

Poan Jingdeng (1603-1659)

29

Guqiao Zhixian

30

Jiantang Dejing (1614-1691)

31

Shuoan Xingzai

32

Minxiu Fuyi (d.1790)

33

Biyan Xiangjie (1703-1765)

34

Jizhou Chengyao (d.1737)

35

Juchau Qingheng

36

Xingyuan Juequan

37

Moxi Haiyin

38

Yuehui Liaochan

39

Liuchang Wuchun

40

Jiehang Daxu

41

Yunfan Changzhao

42

Fenping Zhaoci

43

Dejun Zijue

44

Jitang Jiatai

45

Zhiguang Wenjue (1889-1963)

46

Dongchu Denglang (1861-1939)

47

Huikong Shengyan (1930-2009)

49

Chi Chern (b. 1955)
Zhengzhan Guoru (1951-2024)
Huimin (b.1954)
Guo Huei (b.1958)
Guo Dong (b.1955)
Guo Pin
Guojing
Guo Goang
Guo Zhao
Guo Yi (b. 1980)
Zhengli Guoyuan (b.1948)
Zhengyan Guojun (b.1969)
Zhengjue Guoxing (b.1961)
John Crook (19302011)
Simon Child (b.1956)
Max Kälin (1943-)
Žarko Andričević (1955-)
Gilbert Gutierrez (1951-)

=== Japanese Zen ===
Twenty-four different Zen-lineages are recorded to be transmitted to Japan. Only three survived until today. Sōtō was transmitted to Japan by Dogen, who travelled to China for Chan training in the 13th century CE. After receiving Dharma transmission in the Caodong line he returned to Japan and established the Sōtō line. The Linji line was also transmitted to Japan several times, where it became known as the Rinzai line.

==== Soto school ====
Though Dōgen emphasized the importance of the purity of the teachings, and highly valued lineage and dharma transmission, the Soto-school has its origins in various lineages and dharma transmissions. Dogen received dharma transmission from his Chinese teacher Rujing, with whom he studied two years, but in medieval Soto he was also considered to be a dharma heir of Myōzen, a Rinzai-teacher, with whom he studied eight years. And Tettsū Gikai, the dharma-grandson of Dogen, was also lineage-holder of Nōnin, the founder of the Dharuma-shu, also a Rinzai-school. Gikai passed this lineage over to Keizan, who thereby was also lineage-holder in at least two lineages.

To make the history of Soto even more complicated, the Caodong-lineage that Dogen inherited through Rujing was passed on previously from the Caodong-master Dayang Jingxuan to Touzi Yiqing via the Rinzai-master Fushan Fayuan. Fushan Fayuan had once studied under Dayang Jingxuan. When Jingxuan died Fayuan had received Jingxuan's "portrait, robe, and a verse that expressed his teaching", promising "to pass them on to a suitable successor". Fayuan chose his student Touzi Yiqing to inherit this lineage, a fact that was acknowledged in Keizan's Denkoroku, but "[i]n the standard versions of Dogen's writings, however, all direct references to Yiqing's indirect succession have been eliminated".

Six Patriarchs
Huineng (638-713) (WG: Hui-neng. Jpn: Enō)
Qingyuan Xingsi (660-740) (WG: TCh'ing yüan Hsing-ssu. Jpn: Seigen Gyōshi)
Shitou Xiqian (700-790) (WG: Shih-t'ou Hsi-ch'ien. Jpn: Sekitō Kisen)
Yaoshan Weiyan (ca.745-828) (Yao-shan Wei-yen, Jpn. Yakusan Igen)
Yunyan Tansheng (780-841) (Yün-yen T'an-shen, Jpn. Ungan Donjō)	Linji lineage Linji school
0	Dongshan Liangjie (807-869); Tung-shan liang-chieh, Jpn. Tōzan Ryōkai)	Linji Yixuan
1	Caoshan Benji (840-901) (Ts'ao-shan Pen-chi, Jpn. Sōzan Honjaku)	Yunju Daoying (d.902) (Yün-chü Tao-ying, Jpn. Ungo Dōyō)	Xinghua Cunjiang
2	Tongan Daopi (Daopi)	Nanyuan Huiyong
3	Tongan Guanzhi (Tongan)	Fengxue Yanzhao
4	Liangshan Yuanguan	Shoushan Xingnian
5	Dayang Jingxuan (Dayang)	Shexian Guixing
Fushan Fayuan (Rinzai-master))
6	Touzi Yiqing (Touzi)
7	Furong Daokai (Daokai)
8	Danxia Zichun (Danxia)
9	Hongzhi Zhengjue (1091-1157)	Zhenxie Qingliao (Wukong)
10	Tiantong Zongjue (Zongjue)	Linji lineage Linji school
11	Xuedou Zhijian (Zhijian)	Eisai	Linji lineage Linji school
12	Tiantong Rujing (Rujing)	Myozen	Dahui Zonggao
13	Dōgen	Zhuóān Déguāng (拙庵德光, 1121–1203)
14	Koun Ejō	Nōnin
15	Tettsū Gikai
16	Keizan
Sōtō

==== Rinzai school ====
The Linji school was first brought to Japan by Eisai.

The Otokan lineage was founded by Nanpo Jōmyō 南浦紹明 (1235–1308), who received transmission in China from the monk Xutang Zhiyu 虚堂智愚 (Japanese Kido Chigu, 1185–1269) in 1265, who then returned to Japan in 1267. It was then spread by his student Shuho Myocho (second generation) and Kanzan Egen (third generation), who made it an influential school.

The two main schools today are Takujū and Inzan, which both descent from Hakuin.

Linji lineage / Linji school
Xuan Huaichang

Xutang Zhiyu 虚堂智愚 (Japanese Kido Chigu, 1185–1269) (Note: Korinji – Lineage) (Note: Origins of the Ōtōkan Rinzai Lineage in Japan) (Note: Rinzai (Lin-chi) Lineage of Joshu Sasaki Roshi)

Eisai (1141-1215)
(first to bring Linji school to Japan)
Nanpo Shōmyō (南浦紹明?), aka Entsū Daiō Kokushi (1235–1308)
(brought Ōtōkan school to Japan)
Myozen
Shuho Myocho, aka Daitō Kokushi, founder of Daitoku-ji

Kanzan Egen 關山慧玄 (1277–1360)
founder of Myōshin-ji
- Tettō Gikō (1295–1369)
- Gongai Sōchū (1315–1390)

Juō Sōhitsu (1296–1380)

Muin Sōin (1326–1410)

Tozen Soshin (Sekko Soshin) (1408–1486)

Toyo Eicho (1429–1504)

Taiga Tankyo (?–1518)

Koho Genkun (?–1524)

Sensho Zuisho (?–?)

Ian Chisatsu (1514–1587)

Tozen Soshin (1532–1602)

Yozan Keiyō (?–?)

Gudō Toshoku (1577–1661)

Shidō Bu'nan (Munan)(1603–1676)

Shoju Rojin (Shoju Ronin, Dokyu Etan, 1642–1721)
Kengan Zen'etsu

Hakuin (1686–1768)
Kogetsu Zenzai

Tōrei Enji (1721-1792)
("principle Dharma heir" of Hakuin)
Gessen Zen'e

# Gasan Jitō 峨山慈棹 (1727–1797)
(received dharma trasmission from Gessen Zen'e; studied with Hakuin, received inka from Tōrei Enji)

Inzan Ien 隱山惟琰 (1751–1814)
Takujū Kosen 卓洲胡僊 (1760–1833)

Inzan lineage
Takujū lineage

View template

=== Western Zen ===
Although it is difficult to trace when the West first became aware of Zen as a distinct form of Buddhism, the visit of Soyen Shaku, a Japanese Zen monk, to Chicago during the World Parliament of Religions in 1893 is often pointed to as an event that enhanced its profile in the Western world. It was during the late 1950s and the early 1960s that the number of Westerners, other than the descendants of Asian immigrants, pursuing a serious interest in Zen began to reach a significant level. Especially Japanese Zen has gained popularity in the West. Quintessential in this popularity were the books published by D.T. Suzuki. The various books on Zen by Reginald Horace Blyth, and Alan Watts published between 1950 and 1975, contributed to this growing interest in Zen in the West, as did the interest from beat poets such as Jack Kerouac, Allen Ginsberg and Gary Snyder.

The most successful implementation of Zen-practice was brought about by Shunryu Suzuki, Hakuun Yasutani, and Yasutani's student Taizan Maezumi.

==== Shunryu Suzuki ====
Shunryu Suzuki (鈴木 俊隆 Suzuki Shunryū, dharma name Shōgaku Shunryū 祥岳俊隆, often called Suzuki Roshi) (born May 18, 1904, Kanagawa Prefecture of Japan; died December 4, 1971, in San Francisco, CA, USA) was a Sōtō Zen monk and teacher who helped popularize Zen Buddhism in the United States, and is renowned for founding the first Buddhist monastery outside Asia (Tassajara Zen Mountain Center). Suzuki founded San Francisco Zen Center, which along with its affiliate temples, comprises one of the most influential Zen organizations in the United States. A book of his teachings, Zen Mind, Beginner's Mind, is one of the most popular books on Zen and Buddhism in the West. (Note: Zen Mind, Beginner's Mind at San Francisco Zen Center)

Soto lineage
Soto school
Shunryu Suzuki (1904—1971)
Zentatsu Richard Baker (born 1936) shiho 1971
Hoitsu Suzuki (born 1939)
1. Tenshin Reb Anderson (born 1943) shiho 1983
  1. Sobun Katherine Thanas (☸1927—2012) 1988
    1. Fugan Eugene Bush (born 1954) 2010
      1. Ekyo Dana Takagi 2015
      2. Monshin Nannette Overley 2022
      3. Seigen Chuck Overley 2022
      4. Tetsudo Patrice Monsour - lay entrustment 2023
    2. Gotsuzan Robert Reese (born 1953) 2010
    3. Onryu Patrick Teverbaugh 2011
      1. Myoka Cathy Toldi 2015
    4. Sozan Cathy Whilden (born 1940) 2011
    5. Tey Roberts (☸) - lay entrustment 2011
    6. Patricia Wolff - lay entrustment 2011
    7. Susan McDonald - lay entrustment 2011
  2. Zengyu Paul Discoe (born 1942) 1988
  3. Chikudo Jerome Petersen (☸1928—2010) 1988
  4. Kokuzan Ananda Claude Dalenberg (☸1927—2008) 1988
  5. Eijun Linda Cutts (born 1947) 1996
    1. Keimyo Dario Girolami (born 1967) 2012
    2. Kyoshin Wendy Lewis 2012
    3. Jisan Tova Green (born 1940) 2015
    4. Wendy Johnson - lay entrustment 2006
    5. Ryuko Laura Burges - lay entrustment
    6. Myoju Shinjin Erin Merk 2024
  6. Jakujo Gary McNabb (☸1943—2022) 1998
  7. Furyu Nancy Schroeder 1999
    1. Reirin Alheidis Gumbel 2019
    2. Hakusho Johan Ostlund 2023
  8. Myo Denis Lahey (born 1951) 1999
  9. Taigen Dan Leighton (born 1950) 2000
    1. Nyozan Eric Shutt 2019
    2. Eishin Nancy Easton 2019
  10. Meiya Wender 2002
  11. Leslie James - lay transmission 2002
  12. Setsuan Gaelyn Godwin (born 1951) 2003
    1. Hokyo Louise Dreyfus - lay entrustment - 2012
    2. Nessho Cathy Crouch - lay entrustment - 2012
    3. Dojin Sarah Emerson (born 1971) 2015
    4. Yazan Dave Johnson 2019
    5. Kogen Glen Duval - lay entrustment
    6. Shinji Mary Carol Edwards - lay entrustment
  13. Kiku Christina Lehnherr (born 1947) 2005
    1. Jisan Anna Thorn 2018
    2. Yoen Rosmarie Auriau 2019
  14. Taiyo Lipscomb (born 1943) 2009
    1. Hogetsu Laurie Belzer (born 1959) 2022
  15. Kokyo Henkel (born 1966) 2010
    1. Mushin Antoinette Parekh (born 1959) 2021
  16. Zesho Susan O’Connell 2017
  17. Korin Charlie Pokorny 2018
2. Zenshin Philip Whalen (☸1923—2002) 1987
3. Issan Dorsey (☸1933—1990) 1988
  1. Kijun Steve Allen 1990
4. Ryuten Paul Rosenblum 1999
5. Koyo Dan Welch
6. Chikai Harper Leah (born 1946)
7. Zenki Christian Dillo 2013
8. Yoseki David Beck
9. Tatsudo Nicole Baden
10. Shosan Gerald Weischede
11. Ikkyo Ottmar Engel
1. Jakusho Kwong (born 1935) shiho 1978
  1. Uji Mikolaj Markiewicz
  2. Kimyo Helga Jóakimsdóttir
  3. Zenki Ástvaldur Traustason
  4. Nyoze Demian Kwong
2. Sojun Mel Weitsman (☸1929-2021) 1984
  1. Zenkei Blanche Hartman (☸1926—2016) 1988
    1. Seirin Barbara Kohn - retired 2000
    2. Baizan Cathleen Williams 2001
    3. Kosho McCall (born 1948) 2004
      1. Colin Gipson 2014
      2. Jared Michaels
      3. Peg Syverson
      4. Koji Dreher 2019
    4. Dainei John King (☸1935—2001) 2005
    5. Meiji Tony Patchell 2005
      1. Busshin Lisa Hoffman (born 1959) 2013
      2. Hobu Beata Chapman (born 1958) 2013
      3. Ava Stanton - lay entrustment 2015
    6. Ryumon Hilda Guitierrez Baldoquin 2008
    7. Gengetsu Jana Drakka (☸1952-2017) 2009
    8. Keiryu Liên Shutt
    9. Myozen Joan Amaral (born 1966) 2013
    10. Flint Sparks [Dharma Entrustment?]
  2. Zoketsu Norman Fischer (born 1946) 1988
    1. Seido Lee deBarros (☸1936—2019) 1998
    2. Gyokujun Teishin Layla Smith (☸1946-2022) 1998
    3. Daigan Lueck (☸1931—2015) 1999
    4. Shokan Jordan Thorn (☸1953—2018) 2003
    5. Kanzan Bruce Fortin (born 1941) 2003
    6. Kotatsu John Bailes - 2004
      1. Mark Nelson - Dharma Entrustment
    7. Seishin Arlene Lueck 2005
    8. Jo Myphon Hunt - retired 2005
    9. Shinko Rick Slone 2009
    10. Daion Gloria Ann Lee 2009
    11. Do-An Robert Thomas (born 1959) 2009
    12. Ingen Breen (born 1963) 2009
    13. Nomon Tim Burnett (born 1966) 2011
      1. Heigaku Talus Latona - lay entrustment 2021
    14. Anka Rick Spencer 2011
    15. Shinmon Michael Newton (born 1953) 2011
    16. Myoshin Kate McCandless (born 1951) 2011
    17. Peter van der Sterre 2011
    18. Jishi Jeff Bickner (born 1948) 2012
    19. Rinsho Jay Simoneaux 2012
    20. Hoka Chris Fortin (born 1949)
    21. Shudo Chris Burkhart 2019
    22. Mick Sopko - lay entrustment
    23. Susan Moon - lay entrustment
    24. Martha DeBarros - lay entrustment
    25. Eihei Peter Levitt - lay entrustment
      1. Chōkō Kangen Judy Daylen - lay entrustment
      2. Kakuichi Kōshin Simon Rompré - lay entrustment
    26. Alan Block - lay entrustment
    27. James Flaherty - lay entrustment
    28. John Wiley - lay entrustment 2010
    29. J. Lee Nelson - lay entrustment
    30. Nancy Welch - lay entrustment (☸ d.2019)
  3. Ryushin Paul Haller (born 1947) 1993
    1. Unzan Mako Voelkel 2019
    2. Anshi Zachary Smith 2019
    3. Yakugen Myogan Djinn Gallagher 2023
    4. Tatsu Shi Mu Seki Tim Kroll 2023
    5. Gendo Lucy Xiao 2025
  4. Myogen Steve Stucky (☸1946-2013) 1993
    1. Koshin Christine Palmer (born 1949) 2013
    2. Renshin Bunce (born 1943) 2013
  5. Steve Weintraub (born 1947) 1993
    1. David Weinberg (born 1943) 2012
    2. Nyokai Laurie Senauke 2021
    3. Elizabeth Sawyer (born 1948) - lay entrustment 2013
  6. Josho Pat Phelan (born 1948) 1995
    1. Jakuko Mo Ferrell 2023
    2. Zenki Kathleen Batson 2023
    3. Kuden Paul Boyle 2023
  7. Ryuge Gil Fronsdal (born 1954) 1995
  8. Jusan Edward Espe Brown (born 1945) 1996
    1. Kyosho Valorie Beer 2013
      1. Barbara Baccei 2023
    2. Danny Parker 2001
      1. Tiffany Martens 2009
  9. Fran Tribe (☸) 1997
  10. Hozan Alan Senauke (☸1947—2024) 1998
    1. Kenshin Catherine Cascade 2012
    2. Nanzan Shunki Harald Schoecklmann 2022
    3. Juen Ryushin Friederike Boissevain 2022
    4. Hokyo Josu Mary Duryee - lay entrustment 2023
  11. Maylie Scott (☸1935—2001) 1998
  12. Shosan Victoria Austin (born 1953) 1999
    1. Konin Cardenas
    2. Zenju Earthlyn Manuel
    3. Myogen Kathryn Stark (born 1950) 2013
    4. Silver John Hall - lay entrustment 2022
  13. Dairyu Michael Wenger (born 1947) 1999
    1. Surei Darlene Cohen (☸1942—2011) 2002
      1. Jion Susan Postal (☸1940—2014)
        1. Myozan Dennis Keegan (☸1947—2016)
        2. Ebony Song (born 1956)
      2. Ryotan Cynthia Kear (born 1952) 2010
        1. Cynthia Ziegler 2017
        2. Tom Ryuki Hawkins 2017
        3. Koshin Steven Tierney 2021
        4. Betsy Sei Ka Groh 2024
        5. Craig Kodo Edelblut 2025
      3. Sarita Tamayo-Moraga
    2. Tokuden Mark Lancaster (born 1949) 2006
    3. Marc Lesser (born 1952)
    4. Inryu Bobbi Ponce-Barger
    5. Anshin Rosalie Curtis 2011
    6. Bernd Bender (born 1958)
    7. Marsha Angus - lay entrustment
    8. Jamie Howell (born 1945) lay entrustment
  14. Chikudo Lew Richmond (born 1947) 2002
    1. Rinso Ed Sattizahn 2012
      1. Nancy Horin Raika Petrin lay entrustment 2011
      2. Seigan Sozan Miglioli 2025
    2. Kuzan Peter Schireson (born 1946) 2012
    3. Hosho Peter Coyote (born 1941) 2019
      1. Kugaku Richard Laubly 2023
      2. Haku-un David Brazier 2025
  15. Yozen Peter Schneider (born 1937) 2002
  16. Soshin Teah Strozer (born 1944) 2003
    1. Pamela Weiss 2016
    2. Laura O’Loughlin - lay entrustment 2017
    3. Tenzen David Zimmerman 2018
    4. Kosen Gregory Snyder 2019
    5. Heather Shoren Iarusso 2022
  17. Shinshu Roberts (born 1950) 2004
  18. Daijaku Judith Kinst (born 1951) 2004
  19. Myoan Grace Schireson (born 1946) 2005
    1. Myokaku Jane Schneider (born 1936) 2008
    2. Baika Andrea Heaton (Pratt) (born 1960) 2011
      1. Myoho Joshin John Busch 2018
      2. Myogo Mary-Allen Macneil 2019
    3. Myoko Sara Hunsaker 2014
  20. Zenki Mary Mocine (born 1944) 2005
  21. Sokaku Kathie Fischer (born 1952) 2011
  22. Denkei Raul Moncayo
  23. Zenshin Greg Fain (born 1956) 2012
    1. Zenkai Curtis Fabens (☸1982-2023) 2023
    2. Gyokujun Susan Spencer - lay entrustment 2017
  24. Shinchi Linda Galijan (born 1958) 2012
  25. Jiryu Rutschman-Byler 2014
  26. Ryushin Andrea Thach
  27. Ikushin Gerry Oliva
  28. Kakudo Peter Overton
  29. Karen DeCotis 2019
  30. Ango Sara Tashker 2019
  31. Onzen Robert Rosenbaum - lay entrustment
  32. Tetsudo Ross Blum - lay entrustment
  33. Kokyo Susan Marvin - lay entrustment
  34. Sodo Ron Nestor - lay entrustment
  35. Nyokai Laurie Senauke - lay entrustment
  36. Hosho Karen Sundheim - lay entrustment
  37. Bokuren Jake Van Akkeren - lay entrustment
3. Keido Les Kaye (born 1933) 1985
  1. Shungen Misha Merrill (born 1953) 1998
    1. Daion Jane Shuman (born 1951) 2011
    2. Kakushin Jill Kaplan (born 1949) 2013
  2. Nokai Jean-Yves Leclerc (born 1942) 1998
  3. Etsudo Patty Krahl (born 1950) 2004
  4. Jintei Harold Little 2004
    1. Tendo Stacy Waymire 2021
    2. Kigetsu Ramana Waymire 2021
  5. Om Devi Reynolds
  6. Cornelia Junfu Shonkwiler (born 1940) 2008
4. Ryuzen Robby Pellett (☸1956—2019) 2010

==== Hakuun Yasutani ====
Hakuun Yasutani (安谷 白雲, Yasutani Hakuun; 1885–1973) was a Sōtō Rōshi, the founder of the Sanbo Kyodan Zen Buddhist organization. The Sanbõ Kyõdan incorporates Rinzai Kōan study as well as much of Soto tradition, a style Yasutani had learned from his teacher Harada Daiun Sogaku. As founder of the Sanbo Kyodan, and teacher of Taizan Maezumi, Yasutani has been one of the most influential persons in bringing Zen practice to the west. Although the membership of Sanbo Kyodan is small, 3,790 registered followers and 24 instructors in 1988, "the Sanbõkyõdan has had an inordinate influence on Zen in the West". His westerns students have spread out via Taizan Maezumi.

Soto lineage
Rinzai lineage

Harada Sodo Kakusho (1844–1931)
Dokutan Sosan (a.k.a. Dokutan Toyota) (1840–1917)

Rinzai lineage

Harada Daiun Sogaku (1871–1961)
Soto lineage
Joko Roshi
(Note: Bernie Glassmann: "Koryu roshi’s school was called Shakyamuni Kai. The Shakyamuni Kai was formed by Koryu roshi’s teacher, a man named Joko roshi; Joko roshi was actually a priest and teacher in few different Buddhist traditions." A group with a similar name was the Shakuson Shōfu Kai, or "Shakyamuni True Way Society", founded by Kōnen Shaku (1849–1924), a student of Soyen Shaku.)

Hakuun Yasutani
Hakuun Yasutani
Baian Hakujun Kuroda
Koryu Osaka (1901–1985)

Brigitte Koun-an Doru Chiko Daishi D'Ortschy (1921–1990)
Akira Ji'un-ken Kubota (born 1932)
Myodo Ni Satomi (1896–1978)
Philip Kapleau (1912–2004)
Yamada Koun (1907–1989)
Taizan Maezumi (1931–1995)

Willigis Jäger (1925–2020)

1. Bishop, Mitra (born 1941)
2. Henry, Michael Danan (born 1939)
3. Gifford, Dane Zenson
4. Graef, Sunyana (born 1948)
5. Kjolhede, Sonja Sunya Sensei
6. Low, Albert (born 1928)
7. Sachter, Lawson David
8. Toni Packer (born 1927) (Independent)
9. Clarke, Richard (1933–2013) (Independent)
1. Yukiyoshi Zuiun-ken Adachi
2. Reiko Houn-an Adachi
3. Robert Chotan Gyoun Aitken
4. Osamu Shoun-ken Ashida
5. Fr. Niklaus Goun-ken Brantschen, SJ
6. Uta Ryuun-an Dreisbach
7. Sr. Ludwigis Koun-an Fabian, OSB
8. Lourdes Mila Gyokuun-an Golez
9. Ruben Keiun-ken Habito
10. Kodo Nyoun-ken Hasegawa
11. Tetsuo Taiun-ken Hiyama
12. Fr. Willigis Koun-ken Jaeger, OSB
13. Akira Ji'un-ken Kubota
14. Heidi Heki-un an Kern
15. Johannes Houn-ken Kopp
16. Victor Yuun-ken Loew
17. Peter Choun-ken Lengsfeld
18. David Tetsuun-ken Loy
19. Sr. Elaine Koun-an MacInnes
20. Gundula Zuiun-an Meyer
21. Carmen Baika-an Monske
22. Teizo Kaku'un-ken Nakamura
23. Tsuneo Go'un-ken Oda
24. Akira Soun-ken Onda
25. Silvia Rin'un-an Ostertag
26. Sonia Shuni-an Punzalan
27. Kathleen Seiun-an Reiley
28. Joan Jo-un Rieck
29. Ama Genun-ken Samy
30. Ana Maria Kiun-an Schlüter Rodes
31. Shitetsu Shoun-ken Sendo
32. Paul Choun-ken Shepherd
33. Roselyn Seiun-an Stone
34. Toshio Hekiun-ken Tonoike
35. Shue Reiunken Usami
36. Masamichi Ryoun-ken Yamada
1. Alfred Jitsudo Ancheta
2. Susan Myoyu Andersen-Palmer
3. Jan Chozen Bays (born 1945)
4. Charlotte Joko Beck (1917–2011)
5. Charles Tenshin Fletcher
6. Tetsugen Bernard Glassman (born 1939)
7. John Daido Loori (1931–2009)
8. Dennis Genpo Merzel (born 1944)
9. Nicolee Jikyo Miller-McMahon
10. Louis Mitsunen Nordstrom (born 1943)
11. John Tesshin Sanderson
12. Gerry Shishin Wick
13. William Nyogen Yeo (born 1936)

== See also ==
- Dharma transmission
- Lineage (Buddhism)
- Seungsahn

== Sources ==
- Aitken, Robert (1994), Foreword to "A Buddhist Bible", Boston, Massachusetts: Beacon Press
- Bodiford, William M. (Winter 1991). "Dharma Transmission in Soto Zen: Manzan Dohaku's Reform Movement". Monumenta Nipponica. 46 (4). Sophia University: 423–451. doi:10.2307/2385187. ISSN 0027-0741. JSTOR 2385187.
- Bodiford, William M. (2008), Dharma Transmission in Theory and Practice. In: Zen Ritual: Studies of Zen Buddhist Theory in Practice (PDF), Oxford University Press
- Chang, Chung-Yuan (1967), "Ch'an Buddhism: Logical and Illogical", Philosophy East and West, 17 (1/4), Philosophy East and West, Vol. 17, No. 1/4: 37–49, doi:10.2307/1397043, JSTOR 1397043
- Cleary, Thomas (1990), Transmission of Light, Zen in the Art of Enlightenment by Zen Master Keizan. Translated and introduction by Thomas Cleary, San Francisco: North Point Press, ISBN 0-86547-433-8
- Cleary, Thomas (2005), Classics of Buddhism and Zen: Volume One, Boston, MA: Shambhala publications, ISBN 1-57062-831-9
- Cole, Alan (2009), Fathering Your Father: The Zen of Fabrication in Tang Buddhism, Berkeley, Los Angeles, London: University of California Press, ISBN 978-0-520-25485-5
- Cook, Francis Dojun (2003), Transmitting the Light: Zen Master's Keizan's Denkoroku, Boston: Wisdom Publications
- Dumoulin, Heinrich (1993), "Early Chinese Zen Reexamined: A Supplement to Zen Buddhism: A History" (PDF), Japanese Journal of Religious Studies, 20 (1): 31–53, doi:10.18874/jjrs.20.1.1993.31-53, ISSN 0304-1042, archived from the original (PDF) on March 4, 2009
- Dumoulin, Heinrich (2005), Zen Buddhism: A History. Volume 1: India and China, World Wisdom Books, ISBN 9780941532891
- Ferguson, Andy (2011) [13th century], Zen's Chinese Heritage. The Masters and their Teachings [Wudeng Huiyuan (Compendium of Five Lamps)], Wisdom publications
- Ferguson (2009),
- Fields, Rick (1992), How the Swans Came to the Lake. A Narrative History of Buddhism in America (3rd ed.), Boston & London: Shambhala, ISBN 978-0-87773-631-8
- Jones, Charles B. (2010), "Review of Monks, Rulers and Literati: The Political Ascendancy of Chan Buddhism" (PDF), Journal of Buddhist Ethics
- Koole (1997),
- McMahan (2008),
- McRae, John (2003), Seeing Through Zen. Encounter, Transformation, and Genealogy in Chinese Chan Buddhism, The University Press Group Ltd, ISBN 978-0-520-23798-8
- Morrow, Avery (2008), Theravada Buddhism in Japan (PDF)
- Poceski, Mario (2007), Ordinary Mind as the Way: the Hongzhou School and the Growth of Chan Buddhism, Oxford University Press, ISBN 978-0-19-531996-5
- Schlütter, Morten (2008), How Zen became Zen. The Dispute over Enlightenment and the Formation of Chan Buddhism in Song-Dynasty China, Honolulu: University of Hawai'i Press, ISBN 978-0-8248-3508-8
- Schuhmacher, Stephen; Woerner, Gert, eds. (1991), The Shambala Dictionary of Buddhism and Zen, translated by Michael H. Kohn, Boston: Shambala, ISBN 978-0-877-73520-5
- Sharf, Robert H. (August 1993), "The Zen of Japanese Nationalism", History of Religions, 33 (1): 1–43, doi:10.1086/463354, S2CID 161535877
- Suzuki, D.T. (1949), Essays in Zen Buddhism, New York: Grove Press, ISBN 0-8021-5118-3
- Yampolski, Philip (2003), Chan. A Historical Sketch. In: Buddhist Spirituality. Later China, Korea, Japan and the Modern World; edited by Takeuchi Yoshinori, Delhi: Motilal Banarsidass
- Welter, Albert (2006), Monks, Rulers, and Literati. The Political Ascendancy of Chan Buddhism, Wisdom Books
