= Denkoroku =

Kōan collection written in 1300 by Keizan

- 1996 English edition
- Author: Keizan
- Translator: Francis Dojun Cook (1991, 2003)
- Language: English from Japanese
- Genre: Philosophy; Religion
- Publication date: 1300
- Publication place: Japan
- ISBN: 0-86171-330-3

Denkōroku (伝光録; Record of the Transmission of the Light) is a kōan collection written in 1300 by Keizan Jokin Zenji, the Great Patriarch of Sōtō Zen Buddhism, based on approximately a year of his Dharma talks. This text is not to be confused with "The Jingde Record of the Transmission of the Lamp", while there is considerable overlap of the individuals referenced, the content of these records does not exactly match.

The book includes 53 enlightenment stories covering 1600 or more years based on the traditional legendary accounts of Dharma transmission in the Sōtō lineage. Successive masters and disciples in the book are Shakyamuni Buddha circa 360 to 440 BCE in India, to Zen master Ejō in about 1230 or 1240 in Japan.

While other translations are available as of 2012, this article was developed for the most part from the introduction and translator's note by Francis Dojun Cook.

== Synopsis ==
=== Contents ===
Dharma transmissions covered 28 ancestors from India and 23 from China, followed by Dōgen and Ejō in Japan. Out of modesty and his sense of propriety, Keizan, the 54th ancestor, omitted himself and Tettsu Gikai, one of his teachers who was a student of Ejō and was still alive in 1300. Each chapter is a few pages, except in a couple cases where the author wants to explain a point.

The format for each koan account is in four parts: (1) the main koan case that is the enlightenment encounter between master and disciple, (2) a brief biographical account on the life of the disciple including context for the encounter, (3) Keizan's teisho or commentary on the koan, and (4) a verse written by Keizan summarizing the point, following the Zen tradition of understanding presented by the master or disciple in poetry.

The book is not true in a strictly historical sense: for example, Bodhidharma is probably a mythical figure, the Sixth Patriarch was probably not Huineng, and someone else probably wrote the Platform Sutra. Instead Denkōroku may be read as true in the sense that great novels like Moby-Dick or The Great Gatsby are true. Keizan included fantastical or magical details from the lives of some ancestors, especially those in India, which audiences in times past may have appreciated but which today might be met with skepticism.

The following summary is taken from the Cook translation table of contents, with names according to Thomas Cleary in parentheses.

=== India ===
Keizan begins with Shakyamuni, the historical Buddha, followed by his disciple Mahākāśhyapa (Kasyapa), and then Ananda, both of whom knew Buddha before he died. Following are Shanavasa, Upagupta, Dhritaka (Dhrtaka), Micchaka, Vasumitra, Buddhanandi, Buddhamitra (Punyamitra), Parshva, Punyayashas, Ashvaghosa (Ashvaghosha), and Kapimala. Then comes Nagarjuna, Kanadeva, Rahulata, Sanghanandi, Gayashata (Jayashata), Kumarata, Jayata, Vasubandhu, Manorhita (Manora), Haklenayashas (Haklena), Aryasimha (Sinha), Basiasita (Vashashita), Punyamitra, and Prajnatara. Finally, Bodhidharma was the 28th ancestor from India.

=== China ===
Following Bodhidharma, Dazu Huike (Huike [Shenguang]) was the 29th ancestor, the 2nd in China. Following are Jianzhi Sengcan (Sengcan), Dayi Daoxin (Daoxin), Daman Hongren (Hongren), Dajian Huineng (Huineng), Qingyuan Xingsi (Qingyuan), Shitou Xiqian (Shitou), Yaoshan Weiyan (Yaoshan), Yunyan Tansheng (Yunyan), Dongshan Liangjie (Dongshan), Yunhju Daoying (Yunju), Tongan Daopi (Daopi), Tongan Guanzhi (Tongan), Liangshan Yuanguan (Liangshan), Dayang Jingxuan (Dayang), Touzi Yiqing (Touzi), Furong Daokai (Daokai), Danxia Zichun (Danxia), Zhenxie Qingliao (Wukong), Tiantong Zongjue (Zongjue), Xuedou Zhijian (Zhijian), and Tiantong Rujing (Rujing).

=== Japan ===
The 51st ancestor was Eihei Dogen who traveled from Japan to China and back. The 52nd ancestor was his student, Koun Ejō.

== Authorship ==
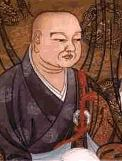
Keizan is generally held to be the author.

Keizan originally gave this series of 53 Dharma talks to the monks of the Daijō-ji monastery during spring and the following winter ango practice periods. Keizan was 36 years old at the time.

According to one translator, Francis Cook, there is some controversy and "uneasiness" about authorship. At first, the work was hidden from the public eye for nearly 600 years. A monk named Sen'ei was the first to publish it, in 1857, or 557 years after it was written. Then in 1886, Yoshida Gizan published an annotated edition in Kyoto. In 1885, Sōji-ji published what is called the Honzan edition, based on a manuscript copy owned by a private collector. The oldest existing manuscript copy was found in 1959. It is thought to have been copied during the late to mid-15th century. Komazawa University published a catalog in 1962, which listed 11 copies. By 1976, 19 copies were known—some of them verified and some not. Some of these copies were known to no longer exist. Okubo Doshu, a noted Dogen scholar, doubted the work's author for a number of reasons, including discrepancies in the last two chapters, along with the absence of a historical record attributing what is a major work to Keizan. But neither he nor any other scholar has ever come out to say that Keizan is not the author, so the consensus remains to attribute the work to Keizan.

== Author ==
While Dōgen is held to be the school's founder, Keizan was in large part responsible for the flourishing of Sōtō Zen. He resisted the purist approach taken by Dōgen who preferred to teach and write; he took care to serve his congregation who might have dead or dying relatives; he founded new monasteries and temples; and he attracted followers like Gashau and Meiho who became his successors. Today Sōtō Zen remains one of the largest Buddhist organizations in Japan.

== Reaction ==
One translator, Cleary, writes:

One of the proverbial guidelines for Zen study is: "First awaken on your own, then see someone else." As a handbook of method, Transmission of Light is a classic guide to "awakening on your own." As a collection of criteria, it is a way to "see someone else."

== Bibliography ==
- Roshi P. T. N. Jiyu Kennett, Zen is Eternal Life, Shasta Abbey Press, 4th edition, 2000, ISBN 0-930066-20-0
- The Denkoroku: or The Record of the Transmission of the Light , by Keizan Zenji, translated by Rev. Hubert Nearman, Shasta Abbey Press, 2001, ISBN 0-930066-22-7
- Transmission of Light, Zen in the Art of Enlightenment by Zen Master Keizan, Translated and introduction by Thomas Cleary, North Point Press, San Francisco, 1990. ISBN 0-86547-433-8
- The Record of Transmitting the Light: Zen Master Keizan's Denkoroku, Translated and introduction by Francis Dojun Cook, Wisdom Publications, 2003 [1991], ISBN 0-86171-330-3
- (fr) Keizan Jōkin (transl. Jean Nyojo Rat), Denkōroku [« Le Recueil de la Transmission de la Lumière »], Almora, coll. « Les Deux Océans », 2024, 650 p. ISBN 9782351187050
