= Caodong school =

Chinese Chan Buddhist branch

Caodong school (Chinese: 曹洞宗; pinyin: Cáodòng zōng; Wade–Giles: Ts'ao-tung-tsung) is a Chinese Chan Buddhist branch and one of the Five Houses of Chan.

The school emphasised sitting meditation (Ch: zuochan, Jp: zazen), and the "five ranks" teaching. During the Song dynasty, Caodong masters like Hongzhi Zhengjue developed "silent illumination" (mozhao) meditation.

== Etymology ==
The key figure in the Caodong school was founder Dongshan Liangjie (807–869, 洞山良价, Jpn. Tozan Ryokai) and his heir Caoshan Benji (840–901, 曹山本寂, Ts'ao-shan Pen-chi, Jpn. Sōzan Honjaku). Some attribute the name "Caodong" as a union of "Dongshan" and "Caoshan". The "Cao" may also be from Cáoxī (曹溪), the "mountain-name" of Huineng, the Sixth Ancestor of Chan, as Caoshan was of little importance unlike his contemporary and fellow Dharma-heir, Yunju Daoying.

== History ==
The Caodong school was founded by Dongshan Liangjie and his Dharma-heir Caoshan Benji. Dongshan traced back his lineage to Shitou Xiqian (700–790), a contemporary of Mazu Daoyi (709–788). Sayings to the effect that Shitou and Mazu were the two great masters of their day date from decades after their respective deaths. Shítóu's retrospective prominence owes much to the importance of Dongshan Liangjie. Shítóu does not appear to have been influential or famous during his lifetime:

He was a little-known teacher who led a reclusive life and had relatively few disciples. For decades after Shitou's death, his lineage remained an obscure provincial tradition.

In the 11th century the Caodong-school nearly extinguished. Dayang Jingxuan (942-1027), the last descendant of the Caodong-lineage passed on his dharma-transmission via Fushan Fayuan, a teacher from the Linji school, to Fayuan's student Touzi Yiqing (1032-1083), who was born five years after Jingxuan's death.

During the Northern Song (960–1127) the Caodong was not successful in the social elite. The Linji school and Yunmen school dominated Chán. It was Touzi Yiqing's student Furong Daokai (1043–1118) who was a successful monastic, and revived the Caodong school.

His dharma "grandson" Hongzhi Zhengjue (1091–1157) became very successful among elite literati in the Southern Song (1127–1279), when the Imperial Court decreased their influence on society, and Chán schools became dependent on elite literati for support. Under Hongzhi and Zhengzie Qingliao, the Caodong school was revived and became one of the major traditions of Song dynasty Chan.

These Song era teachers taught a practiced termed "silent illumination" or "serene reflection" (Ch: 默照禅) which relied on the doctrine of inherent enlightenment and buddha-nature. Since Buddha was seen as something already present in the mind, all that one needed to do was to let go of all striving and this was achieved by silently sitting in meditation.

The success of the revived Caodong school drew opposition from Linji school figures like Dahui Zonggao, who promoted the Hua Tou method of koan practice, and attacked silent illumination as quietistic.

In 1227 Dōgen Zenji, a former Tendai student, studied Caodong Buddhism under Tiantong Rujing, and returned to Japan to establish the Sōtō sect. His lineage incorporates not only the dharma-transmission via Fushan Fayuan, but also Linji dharma-transmissions via Eisai and his student Myozen, a teacher of Dogen, and the Linji dharma-transmission of Dahui Zonggao via the Nōnin school.

== Influence ==
=== Korea ===
Caodong school was introduced to Korea at the end of Silla, through Seon master Ieom (利嚴, 869–936). He arrived China in 894 and studied under teaching of Yunju Daoying. He returned to Silla in 911 and then established Sumi-san (須彌山) school to expand Caodong's teaching. He had several hundred students, his sect is one of Nine mountain schools. Later, the Nine mountain schools had been unified to Jogye Order by Jinul and Taego Bou.

=== Japan ===
In the 13th century, Dōgen Zenji studied the Caodong tradition and brought the teachings and techniques over to Japan, where it became known as Sōtō Zen. Today, there are over 14,000 Sōtō temples in Japan and Dōgen is regarded alongside Keizan as the Japanese tradition’s ancestors.

=== Vietnam ===
Caodong school is called "Tào Động tông" in Vietnamese. It was brought to the north Vietnam in the late of 17th century by Thiền master Thông Giác Thủy Nguyệt (通覺水月, 1637-1704), a disciple of Yiju Zhijiao (一句智教). Chan master Zhijiao is the 4th generation after Zhanran Yuancheng (湛然圓澄, 1561-1626) - one of Caodong school's famous revivers in late Ming period.

== Lineage chart ==
via Shitou the Caodong traces back its origins to Huineng.

Six Patriarchs

Huineng (638-713)
(WG: Hui-neng. Jpn: Enō)

Qingyuan Xingsi (660-740)
(WG: Tch'ing yüan Hsing-ssu. Jpn: Seigen Gyōshi)

Shitou Xiqian (700-790)
(WG: Shih-t'ou Hsi-ch'ien. Jpn: Sekitō Kisen)

Yaoshan Weiyan (ca.745-828)
(Yao-shan Wei-yen, Jpn. Yakusan Igen)

Yunyan Tansheng (780-841)
(Yün-yen T'an-shen, Jpn. Ungan Donjō)
Linji lineage
Linji school
0
Dongshan Liangjie (807-869)
Tung-shan liang-chieh, Jpn. Tōzan Ryōkai)
Linji Yixuan
1
Caoshan Benji (840-901)
(Ts'ao-shan Pen-chi, Jpn. Sōzan Honjaku)
Yunju Daoying (d.902)
(Yün-chü Tao-ying, Jpn. Ungo Dōyō)
Xinghua Cunjiang
2

Tongan Daopi (Daopi)
Nanyuan Huiyong
3

Tongan Guanzhi (Tongan)
Fengxue Yanzhao
4

Liangshan Yuanguan
Shoushan Xingnian
5

Dayang Jingxuan (942-1027) (Dayang)
Shexian Guixing

Fushan Fayuan (Rinzai-master))
6

Touzi Yiqing (1032-1083) (Touzi)

7

Furong Daokai (1043-1118) (Daokai)

8

Lumen Zijue (d.1117)
Danxia Zichun (1064-1117) (Danxia)

9

Puzhao Yibian (1081-1149)
Hongzhi Zhengjue (1091-1157)

Zhenxie Qingliao (Wukong)

10

Lingyan Sengbao (1114-1171)
Tiantong Zongjue (Zongjue)

11

Yushan Shiti
Xuedou Zhijian (Zhijian)

12

Xueyan Huiman (d.1206)
Tiantong Rujing (Rujing)

13

Wansong Xingxiu (1166-1246)
Dōgen

14

Xueting Fuyu (1203-1275)
Soto-lineage

Soto school

15

Lingyin Wentai (d.1289)

16

Huanyuan Fuyu (1245-1313)

17

Chunzuo Wencai (1273-1352)

18

Songting Ziyan

19

Ningran Liaogai (1335-1421)

20

Jukong Qibin (1383-1452)

21

Wufang Kecong (1420-1483)

22

Yuezhou Wenzai (1452-1524)

23

Zongjing Zongshu (1500-1567)

24

Huanxiu Changrun (d.1585)

25

Cizhou Fangnian (d.1594)

26

Yunmen Yuancheng (1561-1626)

27

Ruibai Mingxue (1584-1641)

28

Poan Jingdeng (1603-1659)

29

Guqiao Zhixian

30

Jiantang Dejing (1614-1691)

31

Shuoan Xingzai

32

Minxiu Fuyi (d.1790)

33

Biyan Xiangjie (1703-1765)

34

Jizhou Chengyao (d.1737)

35

Juchau Qingheng

36

Xingyuan Juequan

37

Moxi Haiyin

38

Yuehui Liaochan

39

Liuchang Wuchun

40

Jiehang Daxu

41

Yunfan Changzhao

42

Fenping Zhaoci

43

Dejun Zijue

44

Jitang Jiatai

45

Zhiguang Wenjue (1889-1963)

46

Dongchu Denglang (1861-1939)

47

Huikong Shengyan (1930-2009)

49

Chi Chern (b. 1955)
Zhengzhan Guoru (1951-2024)
Huimin (b.1954)
Guo Huei (b.1958)
Guo Dong (b.1955)
Guo Pin
Guojing
Guo Goang
Guo Zhao
Guo Yi (b. 1980)
Zhengli Guoyuan (b.1948)
Zhengyan Guojun (b.1969)
Zhengjue Guoxing (b.1961)
John Crook (19302011)
Simon Child (b.1956)
Max Kälin (1943-)
Žarko Andričević (1955-)
Gilbert Gutierrez (1951-)

== See also ==
- Dongshan Liangjie
- Index of Buddhism-related articles
- Schools of Buddhism
- Five Houses of Chán
- Linji school
- Sōtō
- Zazen
- Shikantaza

== Sources ==
- Buswell, Robert E.; Lopez, Donald S. (2014), The Princeton dictionary of Buddhism, Honolulu: Princeton University Press, ISBN 9781299951082
- Cleary, Thomas (1990), Transmission of Light, Zen in the Art of Enlightenment by Zen Master Keizan. Translated and introduction by Thomas Cleary, San Francisco: North Point Press, ISBN 0-86547-433-8
- Bodiford, William M. (Winter 1991). "Dharma Transmission in Soto Zen: Manzan Dohaku's Reform Movement". Monumenta Nipponica. 46 (4). Sophia University: 423–451. doi:10.2307/2385187. ISSN 0027-0741. JSTOR 2385187.
- Ferguson, Andrew E. (2009). Zen's Chinese heritage : the masters and their teachings (Illustrated ed.). Boston: Wisdom Publications. ISBN 978-0-86171-163-5.
- Ferguson, Andy (2011), Zen's Chinese Heritage. The Masters and their Teachings, Wisdom publications
- Poceski, Mario (2007), Ordinary Mind as the Way: the Hongzhou School and the Growth of Chan Buddhism, Oxford University Press, ISBN 978-0-19-531996-5
- Schlütter, Morten (2008), How Zen became Zen. The Dispute over Enlightenment and the Formation of Chan Buddhism in Song-Dynasty China, Honolulu: University of Hawai'i Press, ISBN 978-0-8248-3508-8
