= Tiantong Zongjue =

Chinese monk

Tiantong Zongjue 天童宗珏
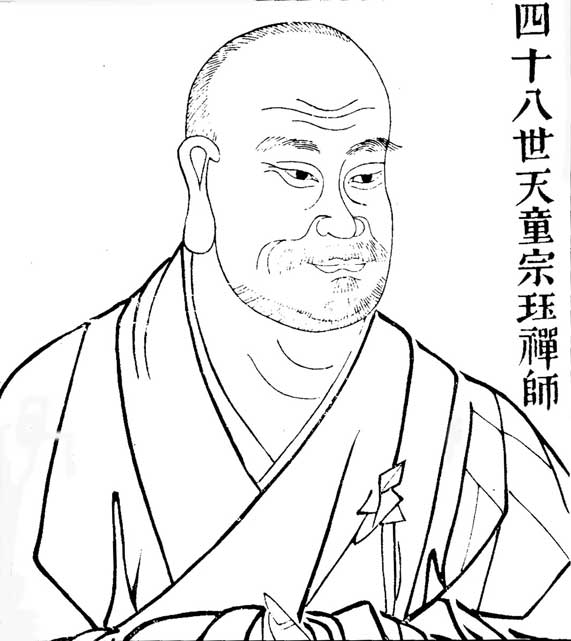
- Title: Chán master

Personal life
- Born: 1091 Hezhou, China
- Died: 1162 (aged 70–71)

Religious life
- Religion: Buddhism
- Denomination: Chán/Zen
- School: Caodong/Sōtō

Senior posting
- Teacher: Zhenxie Qingliao
- Predecessor: Zhenxie Qingliao
- Successor: Xuedou Zhijian
- Students: Xuedou Zhijian

Tiantong Zongjue (Chinese: 天童宗珏; Japanese: Tendō Sōkaku), was a Chinese Chan (Zen) Buddhist monk during the Song Dynasty. He was born in Hezhou, but left home to practice Buddhism at the age of sixteen. His ordination took place two years later. Zuzhao Daohe of the Yunmen School was his first teacher. However, Daohe retired and was replaced by Zhenxie Qingliao of the Caodong/Sōtō School, who became the teacher that gave Zongjue dharma transmission. In 1132, Zongjue became the abbot of Yuelin Temple where he served for 23 years. After this period, his abbacy switched to Mt. Xuedou. He remained there for four years before becoming the abbot of Tiantong Monastery near the modern city of Ningbo in 1159. He was replacing the former abbot, the famous Hongzhi Zhengjue, who died there in 1157. It was from this final temple, where Zongjue died in 1162, that he took his name. Tiantong temple was the same monastery where Eihei Dogen studied under Tiantong Rujing before bringing the teaching back to Japan and founding the Sōtō School.

Buddhist titles
| Preceded by Zhenxie Qingliao | Caodong Chan/Sōtō Zen patriarch | Succeeded by Xuedou Zhijian |
