= Zhenxie Qingliao =

Buddhist monk (1088–1151)

Zhenxie Qingliao 真歇清了
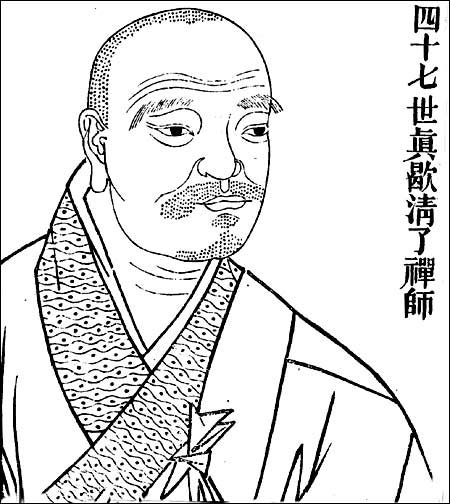
- Title: Chán master

Personal life
- Born: 1088 China
- Died: 1151 (aged 62–63)

Religious life
- Religion: Chán/Zen
- School: Caodong/Sōtō

Senior posting
- Teacher: Danxia Zichun
- Predecessor: Danxia Zichun
- Successor: Tiantong Zongjue
- Students: Tiantong Zongjue

Zhenxie Qingliao (Chinese: 真歇清了; pinyin: Zhēnxiē Qīngliǎo; Japanese: Shinketsu Seiryō; Korean: Chinhŏl Ch'ŏngnyo; Vietnamese: Chân Yết Thanh Liễu), also known as Changlu Qingliao (Chinese: 長蘆清了; pinyin: Chánglú Qīngliǎo; Japanese: Chōro Seiryō), was a Chinese Chan/Zen Buddhist monk during the Song Dynasty.

== Early life ==
He was born in Anchang, an ancient city in what is now Sichuan Province. According to traditional biographies, he became a monk at the age of eleven. The scholar Morten Schlütter calls Qingliao, along with his fellow student Hongzhi Zhengjue, "the most illustrious representative of the Caodong tradition in the Song [Dynasty]."

Multiple sources contain a story about Qingliao regarding an event that took place after he received dharma transmission from his teacher Danxia Zichun.

After leaving his teacher, he became the head monk at a monastery on Mt. Changlu, whose abbot was Zuzhao Daohe of the Yunmen school. Daohe offered to allow Qingliao to become the abbot of the monastery, inherit his robe, and serve as his heir. Qingliao said he would become abbot, but could not be Daohe's heir since Zichun had already given him dharma transmission.

Daohe later left the monastery without passing on his position, but ultimately Qingliao was instructed by a fiscal commissioner named Chen to take charge of the monastery. The students there apparently were amazed at his degree of loyalty to his original teacher. This story has historical significance because it suggests that Qingliao could have accepted Daohe’s offer to essentially switch heirs, indicating that teacher-student transmission was probably more flexible than often thought. Zhenxie Qingliao is also remembered as the initial target of the koan advocate Dahui Zonggao's attacks on silent illumination-style meditation.

Buddhist titles
Preceded by Danxia Zichun	Caodong Chan/Sōtō Zen patriarch	Succeeded by Tiantong Zongjue
