= Book of Equanimity =

Jin-dynasty book of koans

Book of Equanimity or Book of Serenity or Book of Composure (Chinese: 從容錄, Cóngróng lù; Japanese: 従容錄, Shōyōroku) is a book compiled by Wansong Xingxiu (1166–1246), and first published in 1224. The book comprises a collection of 100 koans written by the Chan Buddhist master Hongzhi Zhengjue (1091–1157), together with commentaries by Wansong. Wansong's compilation is the only surviving source for Hongzhi's koans.

The full title is The Record of the Temple of Equanimity With the Classic Odes of Venerable Tiantong Jue and the Responsive Commentary of Old Man Wansong (萬松老評唱天童覺和尚 頌古從容庵錄, Wansong Laoren Pingchang Tiantong Jue Heshang Songgu Congrong An Lu, Taisho Tripitaka Vol. 48, No. 2004).

Along with The Gateless Barrier, the Book of Equanimity is considered one of the two primary compilations of Zen dialogue. Shohaku Okumura has called the collection "a classic text that is still studied by Zen students today." Reb Anderson has called it "an auspicious peak in the mountain range of Zen literature, a subtle flowing stream in the deep valleys of our teaching, a treasure house of inspiration and guidance in studying the ocean of Buddhist teachings." Gerry Shishin Wick, who published a translation of Book of Equanimity in 2005, says "although it was collected by a master in the Soto lineage, The Book of Equanimity, they are treated as Koans in the Rinzai, some Rinzai schools, and the Soto school studied them, but more as liturgy, rather than as Koans."

== Kōans included in Book of Equanimity ==
1. The World-Honored One Ascends the Rostrum
2. Bodhidharma's "Vast and Void"
3. The Indian King Invites the Patriarch
4. The World-Honored One Points to the Ground
5. Seigen's "Price of Rice"
6. Master Ba's "White and Black"
7. Yakusan Ascends the Rostrum
8. Hyakujō and the Fox
9. Nansen Kills a Cat
10. An Old Woman near Taizan
11. Unmon's "Two Diseases"
12. Jizō Plants the Rice Field
13. Rinzai's "Blind Donkey"
14. Attendant Kaku Offers Tea
15. Kyōzan Thrusts His Hoe into the Ground
16. Mayoku Shook the Ring-Staff
17. Hōgen's "Hairsbreadth"
18. Jōshū's Dog
19. Unmon's "Mt. Sumeru"
20. Jizō's "Most Intimate"
21. Ungan Sweeps the Ground
22. Gantō's Bow to the Kaatz
23. Roso Faces the Wall
24. Seppō's "Look at the Snake"
25. Enkan's "Rhinoceros Fan"
26. Kyōzan Points to Snow
27. Hōgen Points to the Bamboo Blinds
28. Gokoku's "Three Disgraces"
29. Fuketsu's "Iron Ox"
30. Daizui's "Kalpa Fire"
31. Unmon's "Pillar"
32. Kyōzan's Mind and Objective World
33. Sanshō's "Golden Scales"
34. Fuketsu's "Speck of Dust"
35. Rakuho's Obeisance
36. Master Ba Is Ill
37. Isan's "Karma-Consciousness"
38. Rinzai's "True Person"
39. Jōshū's "Wash Your Bowls"
40. Unmon's "White and Black"
41. Rakuho at His Deathbed
42. Nan'yō and the Water Jug
43. Razan's "Appearing and Disappearing"
44. Kōyō's "Suparnin"
45. Four Phrases from the Engaku Sutra
46. Tokusan's "Study Accomplished"
47. Jōshū's "Oak Tree in the Garden"
48. Vimalakirti's "Not-Two"
49. Tōzan and the Memorial Service
50. Seppō's "What Is This?"
51. Hōgen's "Boat or Land"
52. Sōzan's "Dharma-body"
53. Ōbaku's "Drinkers"
54. Ungan's "Great Mercy"
55. Seppō in Charge of Cooking
56. Misshi and the White Rabbit
57. Gon'yō's One "Thing"
58. "Getting Despised" in the Diamond Sutra
59. Seirin's "Deadly Snake"
60. Tetsuma, the Cow
61. Kempō's "One Line"
62. Beiko's "Enlightenment"
63. Shishō's "Succession"
64. Jōshū Asks about "Death"
65. Shuzan's "Bride"
66. Kyūhō's "Head and Tail"
67. The Wisdom in the Kegon Sutra
68. Kassan Brandishes the Sword
69. Nansen's "Cats and Foxes"
70. Shinsan Asks about Nature
71. Suigan's "Eyebrows"
72. Chūyū's "Monkey"
73. Sōzan's Filial Fulfillment
74. Hōgen's "Form and Name"
75. Zuigan's "Everlasting Principle"
76. Shuzan's Three Verses
77. Kyōzan: As His Profession Requires
78. Unmon's "Rice Cake"
79. Chōsa Takes a Step
80. Suibi and the Chin Rest
81. Gensha Reaches the Province
82. Unmon's "Voice" and "Color"
83. Dōgo's Nursing the Ill
84. Gutei's One Finger
85. The National Teacher's Gravestone
86. Rinzai's Great Enlightenment
87. Sozan: With or Without
88. "Non-Seeing" in the Ryōgon Sutra
89. Tōzan's "Place of No Grass"
90. Kyōzan Speaks Out
91. Nansen and the Peonies
92. Unmon's "One Treasure"
93. Roso Does Not Understand
94. Tōzan Unwell
95. Rinzai Draws a Line
96. Kyūhō Does Not Acknowledge
97. Emperor Dōkō's Helmet Hood
98. Tōzan's "Intimate with It"
99. Unmon's "Bowl and Pail"
100. Rōya's "Mountains and Rivers"

== Translations ==
- Cleary, Thomas. The Book of Serenity: One Hundred Zen Dialogues. Shambhala Publications. ISBN 9781590302491.
- Wick, Gerry Shishin. The Book Of Equanimity: Illuminating Classic Zen Koans. Wisdom Publications. ISBN 9780861713875.

== See also ==
- 101 Zen Stories
- The Gateless Barrier
- Blue Cliff Record
