= Xuedou Zhijian =

Xuedou Zhijian 雪竇智鑑
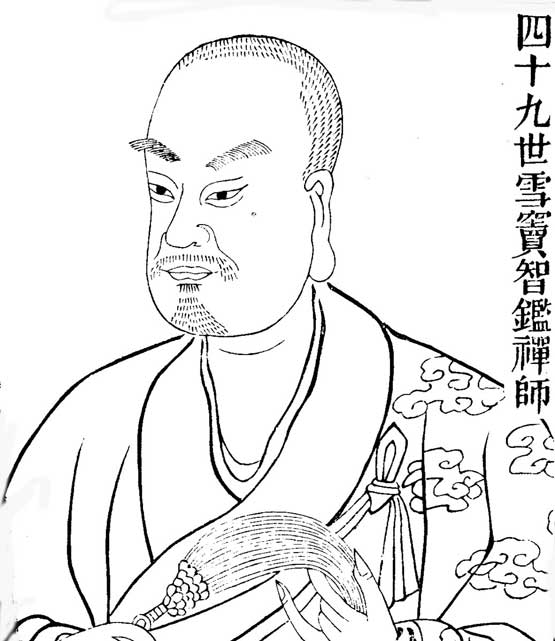
- Title: Chán master

Personal life
- Born: 1105 Chuzhou, Northern Song dynasty
- Died: 1192 (aged 86–87)

Religious life
- Religion: Buddhism
- Denomination: Chan/Zen
- School: Caodong/Sōtō

Senior posting
- Teacher: Tiantong Zongjue
- Predecessor: Tiantong Zongjue
- Successor: Tiantong Rujing
- Students: Tiantong Rujing

Xuedou Zhijian (simplified Chinese: 雪窦智鉴; traditional Chinese: 雪竇智鑑; pinyin: Xuědòu Zhìjiàn; Japanese: Setchō Chikan), was a Chinese Chan (Zen) Buddhist monk of the Song dynasty. He was born in Chuzhou, in modern-day Anhui Province. The details of his life have not survived in great detail. In 1154, he is known to have become the abbot of Xizhen Temple near modern Hangzhou. He moved again in 1184 to Mount Xuedou, where he was said to have many students. In the years leading up to his death in 1192, he apparently lived in seclusion in a cottage to the east of his temple. According to the Conglin shengshi (Glorious matters from the monasteries), written in 1199 by Guyue Daorong, Zhijian wrote a popular verse that poked fun at the renowned teacher Hongzhi Zhengjue. The verse is: “Obtaining one Zong, losing one Chong; Joining his palms in front, beating his chest in back.” "Zong" refers to a well-known student of Hongzhi named Sizong, while "Puchong" is a reference to Yetang Puchong, a student who studied under Hongzhi, but later left to study under Caotang Shanqing, a teacher of the rival Rinzai/Linji school.

Buddhist titles
Preceded by Tiantong Zongjue	Caodong Chan/Sōtō Zen patriarch	Succeeded by Tiantong Rujing
