= Gerry Shishin Wick =

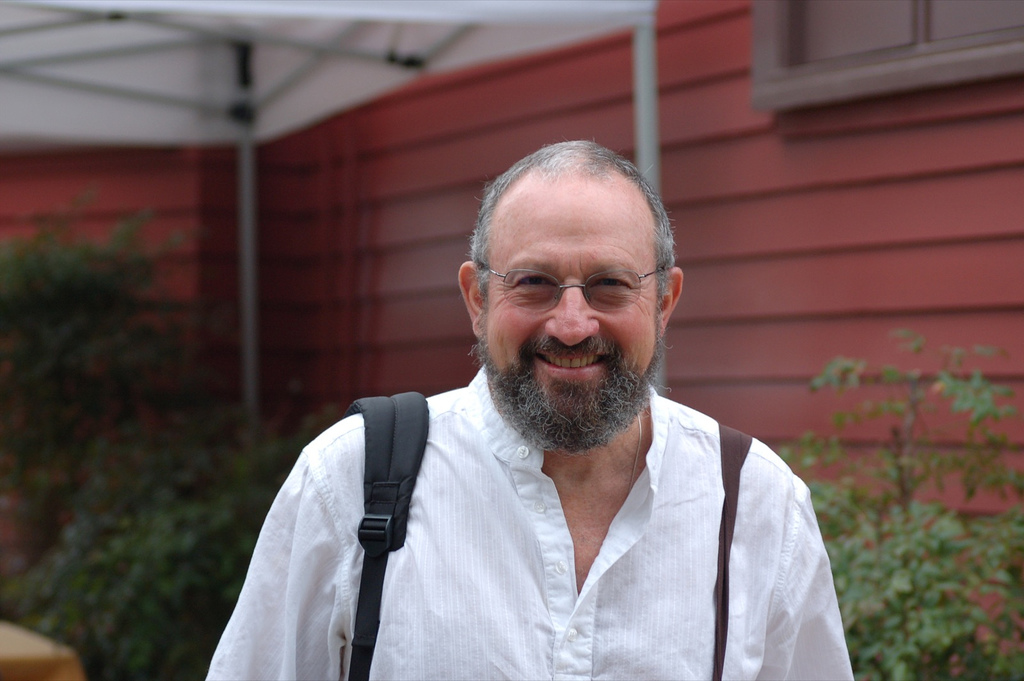
- Gerry Shishin Wick in 2007
- Title: Roshi

Personal life
- Born: United States
- Education: University of California, Berkeley
- Website: gmzc.org

Religious life
- Religion: Zen Buddhism
- School: Harada-Yasutani
- Lineage: White Plum Asanga

Senior posting
- Predecessor: Taizan Maezumi

Gerry Shishin Wick is a Soto Zen roshi, author, oceanographer and abbot of Great Mountain Zen Center in Berthoud, Colorado, which he founded in 1996. He is one of the twelve Dharma Successors of the late Taizan Maezumi, receiving Dharma transmission and a Denkai (precept transmission) from him in 1990. Prior to it, for 24 years he underwent Zen training with Maezumi, Shunryu Suzuki Roshi and Sochu Suzuki Roshi. He remained the president of White Plum Asanga, a Zen school in the Hakuyu Taizan Maezumi lineage, from 2007 to 2014.

He has a Ph.D. in physics from the University of California, Berkeley, and has held a variety of jobs in the scientific community as well as an adjunct teaching position at Naropa University in Boulder, Colorado. He also administered the Zen Center of Los Angeles and the Kuroda Institute for the Study of Buddhism and Human Values from 1978 to 1986. In 2006, Wick received inka from Bernard Glassman. He was acknowledged as a roshi in 2000 at White Plum Asanga, where he remained the president from 2007 to 2014, when he retired as an elder.

== See also ==
- Timeline of Zen Buddhism in the United States

== Bibliography ==
- Wick, Gerald L (1967). Test of time reversal invariance in beta decay of neon-19 and beta decay asymmetries. Thesis (Ph.D. in Physics)--Univ. of California, Berkeley, Sept. 1967.
- Wick, Gerry Shishin. Salt Power: Is Neptune's Ole Salt a Tiger in the Tank?
- Wick, Gerald L. (1981). Harvesting ocean energy/ edited by Gerald L. Wick and Walter R. Schmitt; with the assistance of Robin Clarke. Paris: The Unesco Press.
- Wick, Gerry Shishin; Hongzhi Zhengjue (2005). The Book of Equanimity: Illuminating Classic Zen Koans. Wisdom Publications. ISBN 0-86171-387-7.
- Wick, Gerry Shishin; Ilia Shinko Perez (2006). The Great Heart Way: How to Heal Your Life and Find Self-Fulfillment. Wisdom Publications. ISBN 9780861715138.
