= Danxia Zichun =

Zen Buddhist monk (1064-1117)

Danxia Zichun 丹霞子淳
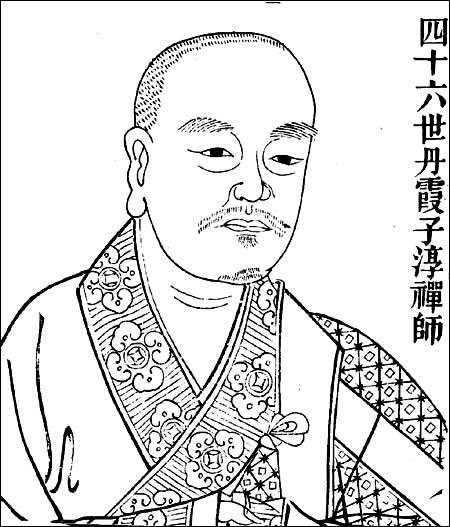
- Title: Chán master

Personal life
- Born: 1064 Zitong, China
- Died: 1117 (aged 52–53)

Religious life
- Religion: Buddhism
- Denomination: Chán/Zen
- School: Caodong/Sōtō

Senior posting
- Teacher: Furong Daokai
- Predecessor: Furong Daokai
- Successor: Zhenxie Qingliao
- Students: Hongzhi Zhengjue Zhenxie Qingliao Huizhao Qingyu

Danxia Zichun (1064–1117) (Chinese: 丹霞子淳; Wade–Giles: Tan-hsia Tzu-ch'un; Hànyǔ pīnyīn Dānxiá Zichún; Japanese: Tanka Shijun) was a Chan (Zen) Buddhist monk during the Song Dynasty.

== Life and legacy ==
Danxia was born in a city called Zitong, which is in modern Sichuan Province. He is buried in south of Mt Hong near the modern city of Wuhan.

While not a particularly notable monk himself, Danxia's three students, Hongzhi Zhengjue, Zhenxie Qingliao, Huizhao Qingyu, were each especially famous during their lifetimes. He is the only student of Furong Daokai that has a collection of recorded sayings that has survived to the present. In these sayings, he advocated a silent illumination approach to seated meditation. For example, he is recorded as saying, "You must completely let go of all worldly concerns and sit totally still in the dry wood hall. You must die a turn and then in this death establish everything in the whole universe."

Buddhist titles
Preceded by Furong Daokai	Caodong Chan/Sōtō Zen patriarch	Succeeded by Zhenxie Qingliao
