= Guo Jun =

Singaporean Buddhist monk

Ven. Guo Jun
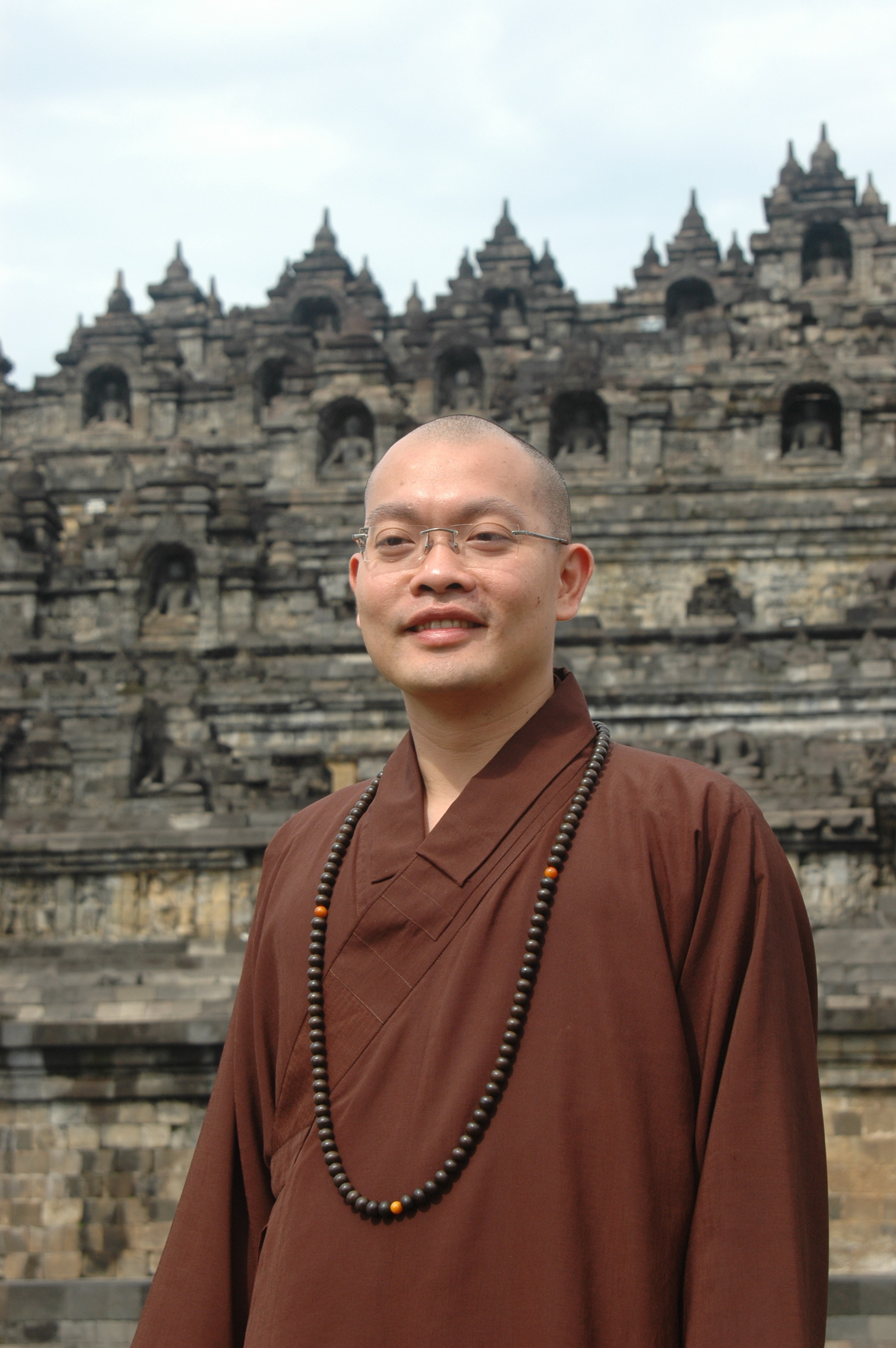
- Guo Jun in 2009
- Title: Chan master

Personal life
- Born: Lai Meau Shin/Lai Miaoxin; 2 November 1974 (age 51) Singapore

Religious life
- Religion: Chan Buddhism
- School: Caodong, Linji, Shingon

Senior posting
- Teacher: Sheng-yen, Song Nian, Wei Li

Ven. Guo Jun (果峻; Pinyin: Guǒjùn) (born 1974) is a Buddhist monk in Singapore, and one of the youngest Dharma heirs of Chan Master Sheng-yen. His complete Dharma name is Zhengyan Guojun (正彥果峻). He has published three books: Essential Chan Buddhism, Chan Heart, Chan Mind and Falling is Flying: The Dharma of Facing Adversity together with Ajahn Brahm.

== Education ==
Before and after his ordination, Guo Jun earned degrees in various fields of study. He has a diploma in biotechnology from Ngee Ann Polytechnic, Singapore. Guo Jun also earned his degree in Buddhist philosophy from Fu Yan Buddhist Institute, Taiwan, Bachelor of Arts in Psychology and Sociology from Monash University, Australia, and Master of Buddhist Studies from University of Sydney, Australia.

== Life and religious training ==
Guo Jun started practicing meditation intensely in 1997. He studied various traditions of Buddhist practice, from Tibetan Buddhism, Theravada Buddhism, and also Mahayana tradition, including Chan Buddhism under the guidance of Sheng-yen. He entered solitary retreat in 1999 in Korea at Hwa Gye Sa Buddhist Monastery and Song Kwang Sa Buddhist Monastery.

After learning under personal tutelage of Sheng-yen from Dharma Drum Mountain, Taipei, Taiwan, Guo Jun got dharma transmission. In 2005 he received lineage transmission as the 58th generation Dharma heir of Linji Chan school and 53rd generation Dharma heir of Caodong Chan School of Chinese Buddhism. Guo Jun also got dharma transmission from Qinying from Fuhui Monastery, Taipei, Taiwan and received transmission as the 42nd generation of Dharma heir of Xianshou Huayan and Cien East Asian Yogācāra schools of Chinese Buddhism. On 28 August 2013, Hsing Yun, the founder of Fo Guang Shan, held the passing of doctrines ceremony for the 69 from the second generation of disciples at Tathagata Hall and Guo Jun was one of them.

Guo Jun is a member of Australian Psychological Society. He is also a spiritual and guiding teacher of Chan Community Canada, and Dharmajala Indonesia. He was the abbot of Dharma Drum Retreat Center in Pine Bush, New York from 2005 to 2008. Guo Jun was the abbot of Mahabodhi Temple in Singapore until 2017. In February 2017, Guo Jun stepped down as abbot of the Mahabodhi Monastery and now the president of the monastery's management committee. Jing Yao replaced him as the abbot, witnessed by senior monks from various countries.

== Controversies ==
=== Court cases ===
Businessman Lee Boon Teow, who was also a trustee of the Mahabodhi Monastery and former vice-president of its management committee, has filed three lawsuits against Guo Jun.

The two were in a dispute over the ownership of a Buddhist sculpture valued around over $1 million. Lee had sued the monk for defamation over a series of group chat messages that the former abbot had shared with other management committee members, where Guo Jun had allegedly implied that Lee's company was in financial difficulties and questioned if his cancer relapse was affecting his judgement and decision-making. Lee claimed that Guo Jun discredited him as he had uncovered the monk's alleged impropriety. Guo Jun countersued Lee, claiming ownership of the sculpture and asked for its return. The sculpture was returned to Guo Jun in December 2017.

On 24 October 2017, a settlement was reached over the defamation lawsuit, with Guo Jun offering to pay $30,000 to Lee to settle the case, without admitting to any defamation or guilt.

In November 2017, Lee sued Guo Jun for return of A$240,000 which Lee had given Guo Jun to study for a doctorate in Australia. Guo Jun did not pursue the studies but used part of the money to buy property in Australia, which was subsequently sold for a profit. Guo Jun believed that the money had been given to him as a gift for his own use, in a Buddhist practice known as dana. The court dismissed Lee's legal action.

=== Financial management ===
During the court proceedings for the lawsuits faced, Guo Jun disclosed that he has at least A$3 million in assets in 2009, and that he has a "different interpretation" of Buddhist concepts of austerity; he believes he should manage his own financial assets and expenditure, without disclosing them to the monastery or its management committee.

=== CPIB report ===
Lee had also filed a Corrupt Practices Investigation Bureau (CPIB) report against Guo Jun. Guo Jun in an email interview with Lianhe Zaobao, replied that he had not been summoned by the police over the report.

=== Guo's press statement ===
In October 2017, Guo Jun released a statement that in the past few years, he had been smeared and falsely accused which caused harm to the Mahabodhi Monastery and Buddhism and apologised for it. In order to protect the reputation, he had spent time and money to safeguard the reputation. In view of that, he would not respond to any rumors anymore.

== See also ==
- Buddhism in Singapore
- Dharma Drum Mountain
- Dharma Drum Retreat Center
