= Furong Daokai =

Chinese Chan/Zen Buddhist monk

Furong Daokai 芙蓉道楷
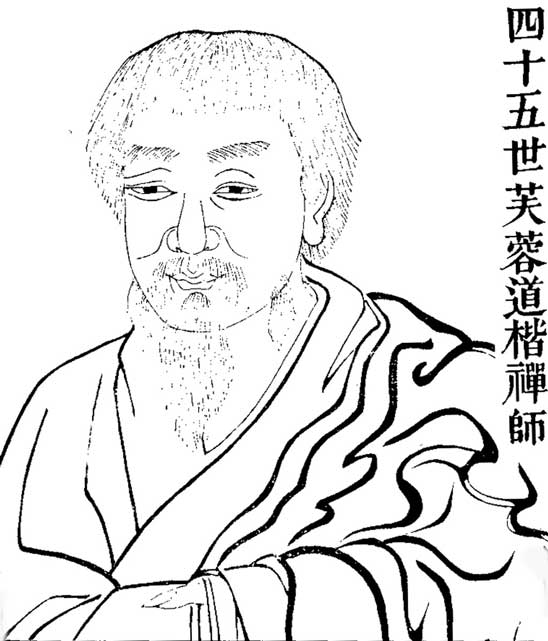
- Title: Chan master

Personal life
- Born: 1043 Yizhou, China
- Died: 1118 (aged 75)

Religious life
- Religion: Buddhism
- Denomination: Chan/Zen
- School: Caodong/Sōtō

Senior posting
- Teacher: Touzi Yiqing
- Predecessor: Touzi Yiqing
- Successor: Danxia Zichun
- Students: Kumu Facheng Dayong Qilian Lumen Fadeng Jingyin Zijue Shimen Yuanyi Baofeng Weizhao Danxia Zichun

Furong Daokai (1043-1118) (Chinese: 芙蓉道楷; Japanese: Fuyō Dōkai; Korean: Puyong Togae; Vietnamese: Phù Dung Đạo Khải), was a Chan/Zen Buddhist monk during the Song Dynasty. He was born in a city known at the time as Yizhou, which is the present-day city of Linyi in the southern part of Shandong Province. Along with his fellow student Dahong Baoen, Daokai is considered to have returned the Caodong Chan/Sōtō Zen lineage to prominence after its near extinction a generation earlier. He was so prominent, in fact, that an extensive biography appeared in the Xudeng lu, a compendium of biographies of prominent monks, in 1101, before he had even reached the height of his career, which was quite unusual for such biographies. The earliest full account of his life appears in Juefan Huihong's biographical compilation of 1119, the Chanlin sengbao zhuan (Chronicle of the Sangha Treasure in the Groves of Chan). This source speaks very highly of Daokai, despite the fact that its author was a member of the competing Linji/Rinzai school. According to his funerary inscription of 1127, he ordained 93 students during his life, and many of these went on to become prominent teachers themselves.

== Biography ==
According to the Chanlin sengbao zhuan (Chronicle of the Sangha Treasure in the Groves of Chan) of 1119, Daokai's first spiritual practices were centered on Daoism, specifically those aimed at achieving immortality. To this end, he did not eat grain and went to live in the mountains as a hermit. Eventually, he gave this up and began practicing Zen at Shutai Temple outside the old capital city of Kaifeng, in modern Henan Province. He later became a student of Touzi Yiqing and received dharma transmission from him. He left Touzi in 1082 and took a position at a public monastery, but was later assigned to the well-known White Horse Temple and Longmen Temple. After this he served at Dayang Jingxuan's former monastery on Mount Dayang in Yingzhou. He again moved, this time to Dahong in Suizhou around 1103. In 1104, the Emperor Huizong ordered Daokai to become the abbot of Shifang Jingyin Temple in the capital, Kaifeng. In 1107 he moved to a different temple, Tianning Wanshou, in the same city. This temple was known as a Chongning temple, which were set up by the Emperor so that its residents would pray for his long life. While Daokai did not have a choice in the matter, he later refused to accept a purple robe given to him by the emperor in protest of this system, and he was exiled as a result to Zizhou near modern Jinan in his home province. Huihong's biography claims that crowds of people mourned as he left the city. The following year, however, the emperor ceased his punishment after Daokai sent a poem explaining his thoughts on the matter to an individual named Wang Songnian, who was in contact with the emperor. At this point, Daokai apparently wished to go to Zhejiang to spread his teaching, but decided to stay in his hometown after finding his father in old age. A wealthy government official named Liu Fengshi patronized the construction of a small monastery for Daokai at Lake Furong near his home village. In 1117, this monastery was give a plaque by the emperor giving it the name Huayan Chan Monastery, indicating the emperor's complete change of heart regarding him by that time. In 1118 Daokai died on the fourteenth day of the fifth month.

Buddhist titles
Preceded by Touzi Yiqing	Caodong Chan/Sōtō Zen patriarch	Succeeded by Danxia Zichun
