= Wansong Xingxiu =

Chinese Buddhist monk

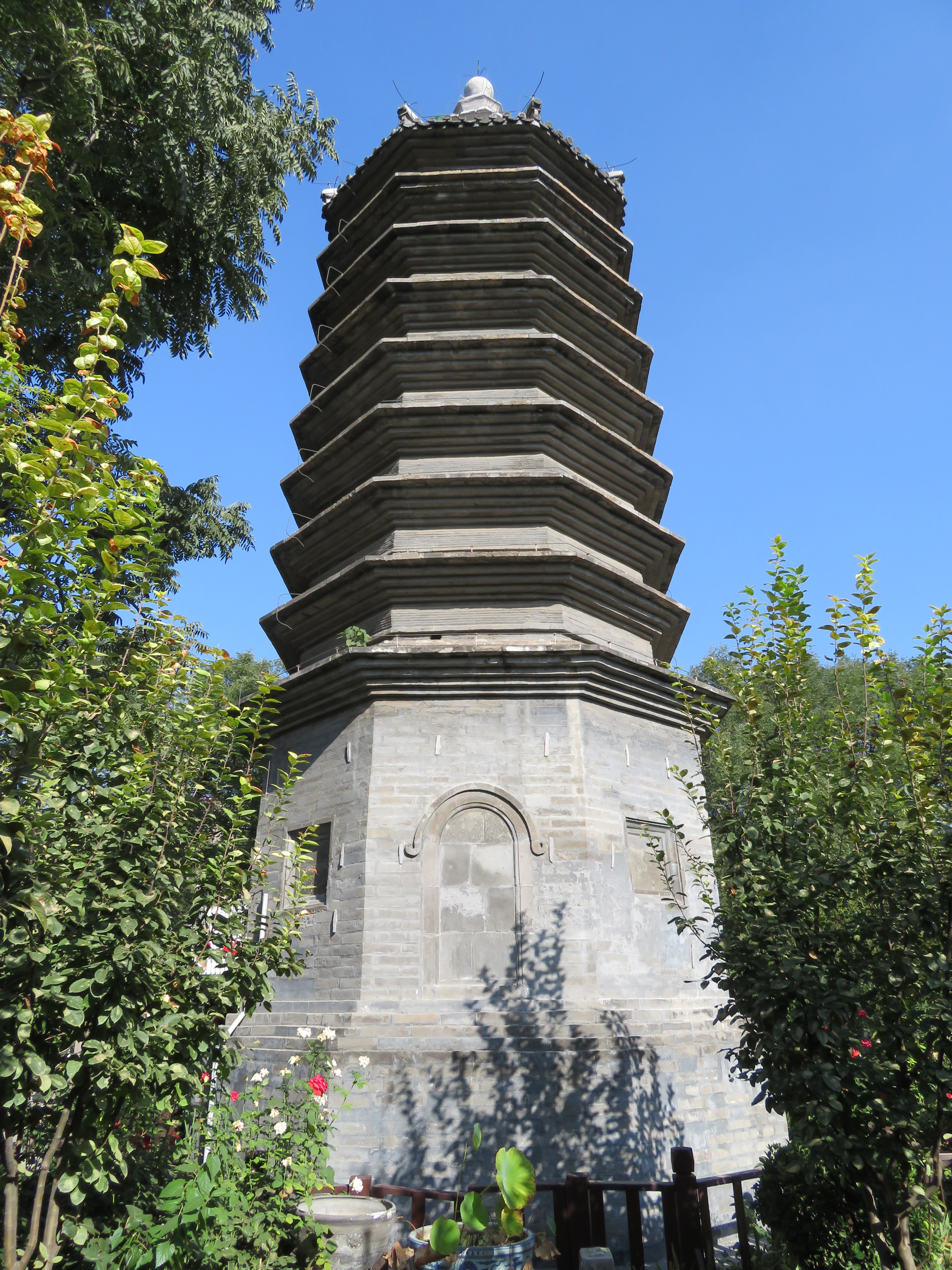
Pagoda of the Old Man of Wansong in Beijing

Wansong Xingxiu (simplified Chinese: 万松行秀; traditional Chinese: 萬松行秀; pinyin: wànsōng xíngxiù) or Wansong Yelao (simplified Chinese: 万松野老; traditional Chinese: 萬松野老; pinyin: wànsōng yělǎo) (1166–1246) was a Chinese Buddhist monk who lived under the Jin dynasty and Mongol Empire. He was an influential member of the Caodong school of Chan Buddhism.

== Biography ==
Wansong was born into the Cai family from Jie county in Hezhong (modern Yuncheng in Shanxi). At the age of fifteen he went to Xingzhou (modern Xingtai in Hebei) where he became a monk, taking the religious name Xingxiu. He then travelled to Cizhou (modern Ci County) to study under Chan Master Xueyan Huiman (雪岩慧滿禪師) (1136–1206). Later he returned to Xingzhou where he lived in the Wansong ("ten thousand pines") Studio, and called himself the "Old Man of Ten Thousand Pines" (Wansong Laoren 萬松老人).

In 1193, Wansong came to the attention of Emperor Zhangzong of Jin (reigned 1189–1208), who invited him to court in order to expound Buddhist teaching. Impressed by his knowledge the emperor presented Wansong with a brocade monk's robe, and asked him to move to the central capital Zhongdu (modern Beijing). In 1197, Wansong moved to Bao'en Temple (寶恩寺) to the west of the central capital, where he resided in the Congrong hermitage (從容庵).

In 1215, the Jin capital of Zhongdu was sacked by the Mongols, and the Jin capital was relocated to Kaifeng. However, Wansong remained at Bao'en Temple, outside the city now renamed Yanjing. In 1223, the Khitan statesman Yelü Chucai (1190–1244), who had surrendered to the Mongols in 1218, visited Wansong to receive Buddhist instruction from him, and thereafter he frequently visited Wansong to ask his advice.

In 1230, Wansong was made abbot of Wanshou Temple (萬壽寺) in Yanjjing.

Wansong died at the age of 81. Just before his death he composed a gatha: "Eighty-one years old, only this one saying; cherish and value all people, and never make a false move" (八十一年，只此一語，珍重諸人，且莫錯舉). He was succeeded as master of Bao'en Temple by Linquan Conglun (林泉從倫).

== Works ==
Wansong wrote two important commentaries on kōan compiled by Hongzhi Zhengjue (1091–1157). In 1224, at the urging of Yelü Chucai, he published a commentary to a collection of one hundred songgu (頌古) kōan by Hongzhi under the title Congrong Lu (從容錄), known in English as the Book of Equanimity or the Encouragement (Hermitage) Record. Wansong's commentary edition ensured the survival of Hongzhi's kōan, and came to be regarded as one of the seminal texts of the Caodong school. Wansong also wrote a commentary on Hongzhi's niangu (拈古) kōan, entitled Qingyi Lu (請益錄), known in English as Record of Seeking Additional Instruction. He also wrote a collection of sayings entitled Wanshou Yulu (萬壽語錄), with a preface dated 1235.

== Pagoda of the Old Man of Wansong ==
After the death of Wansong, his disciples built an octagonal seven-storeyed brick pagoda, 5 metres (16 ft) in height, in Yanjing (modern Beijing) to house his remains. In 1753, during the reign of the Qianlong Emperor of the Qing dynasty, a new nine-storeyed brick pagoda, 15.9 metres (52 ft) in height, was built around the original pagoda, and it was not until 1986 that the original Yuan dynasty pagoda was rediscovered to be still intact inside the later pagoda.

The pagoda now stands near the Xisi intersection in the Xicheng District of Beijing, next to Brick Pagoda Hutong. Until 2010 the pagoda was largely hidden by shops and residential buildings, but after redevelopment of the area for the construction of Xisi Underground Station and restoration of the pagoda it is now open to the public.
