= Guojing =

Chinese children's book author

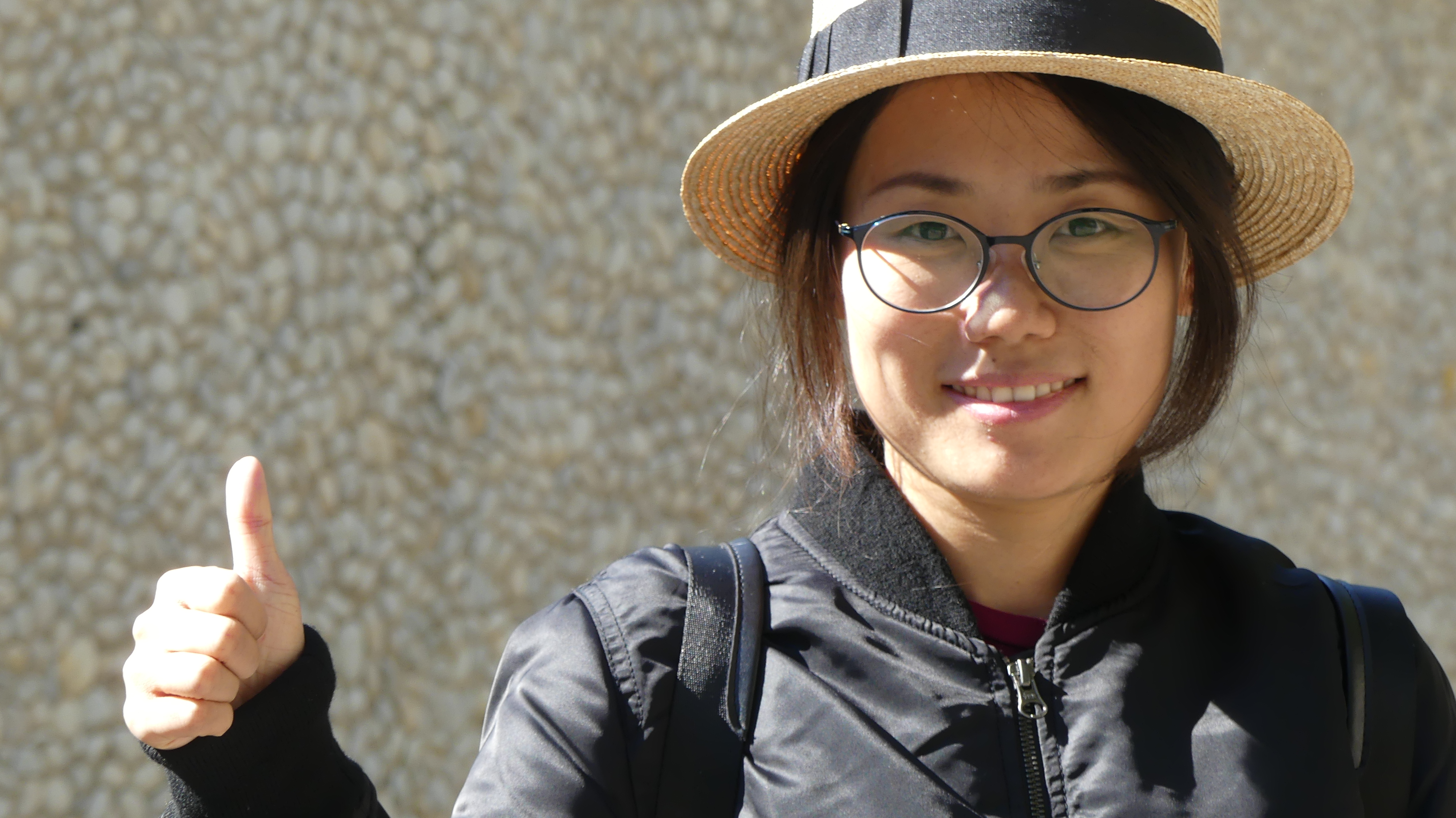
- Guojing in September 2016, during the Berlin International Literature Festival in Berlin, Germany
- Occupations: Artist, children's book author
- Writing career
- Notable works: The Only Child; Stormy; The Flamingo; Oasis
- Website: www.guojingart.com

Guojing is a Chinese author and illustrator best known for her children's books. Her debut book The Only Child, a wordless graphic novel, was selected as one of the best illustrated children's books of 2015 by The New York Times and as one of the 10 best picture books of 2015 by Publishers Weekly.

== Life and career ==
Guojing was born in Shanxi, a province in northern China. She became interested in making art thanks to an art class she took when she was ten years old. She has stated that the isolation and loneliness that she felt as she was growing up under China's one-child policy later provided inspiration for her debut book, The Only Child.

She attended Tianjin Academy of Fine Arts and graduated in 2006 with a Bachelor of Fine Arts. She has previously worked as a concept artist for animated TV shows and games, but the publication and success of The Only Child allowed her to move to working full time on her own work. She followed the publication of that book with two more books for children, Stormy in 2019 and The Flamingo in 2022. Guojing has stated that The Flamingo, a nearly wordless graphic novel for children, was inspired in part by her experiences during the COVID-19 pandemic, including the death of her grandmother and the birth of her first child. Her 2025 children's book, Oasis, was a finalist for the Governor General's Award for English-language Young People's Literature - Illustrated Books. She now lives in Vancouver, Canada and has stated that she is working on a science fiction graphic novel about artificial intelligence.

== Bibliography ==
- The Only Child (2015)
- Stormy: A Story About Finding a Forever Home (2019)
- The Flamingo (2022)
- Oasis (2025)
