= Touzi Yiqing =

Touzi Yiqing 投子義青
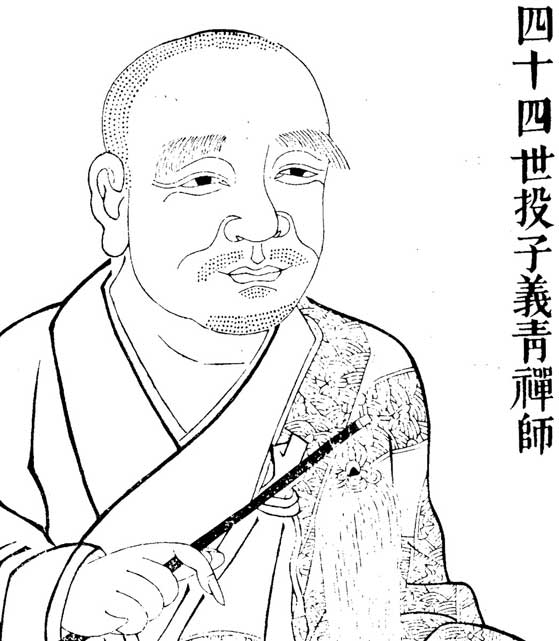
- Title: Chán master

Personal life
- Born: 1032 Yanshi, China
- Died: 1083 (aged 50–51)

Religious life
- Religion: Buddhism
- Denomination: Chán/Zen
- School: Caodong/Sōtō

Senior posting
- Teacher: Fushan Fayuan
- Predecessor: Dayang Jingxuan
- Successor: Furong Daokai
- Students: Furong Daokai Dahong Baoen Puxian Biao

Touzi Yiqing (Chinese: 投子義青; Japanese: Tōsu Gisei; Korean: T'uja Ŭich'ŏng; Vietnamese: Đầu Tử Nghĩa Thanh), sometimes also Touzi Qing Huayan, was a Chan (Zen) Buddhist monk during the early Song Dynasty.

== Biography ==
Touzi Yiqing was born in a city known at the time as Qingshe, which is near the present-day city of Yanshi in Henan Province. An account of his life from the Wudeng Huiyuan (Compendium of Five Lamps), and early 13th century collection of Buddhist biographies, claims he left his parents at the age of seven to study Buddhism at Miaoxing Temple, which was part of the Consciousness-only tradition. Eventually, however, he is said to have found the density of the teachings unhelpful, and so he left to study in the Huayan school instead.

While studying in that tradition, he supposedly came to the realization that any attempt to teach Buddhism through the study of words could not succeed. He again left, this time settling on the Zen practitioner Fushan Fayuan, also known as Yuanjian, as his teacher. While Touzi's predecessor was said to be the last remaining teacher in the Caodong Chan/Sōtō Zen tradition, the lineage flourished with Touzi's devoted students, recovering much of its former prominence.

== Indirect dharma-transmission ==
Touzi Yiqing is a significant figure in the lineage of Caodong Chan/Sōtō Zen because he did not actually study under the man commonly regarded as his predecessor, namely Dayang Jingxuan. This is a unique exception to an otherwise steadfast rule that a lineage must involve direct teacher-to-student dharma transmission in order to be considered valid.

Juefan Huihong's biographical compilation of 1119, the Chanlin sengbao zhuan (Chronicle of the Sangha Treasure in the Groves of Chan), claims that Touzi Yiqing was the "true son" of Dayang Jingxuan. The Xudeng lu of 1101 lists Touzi and nine others as disciples of Dayang. However, it also explains that Touzi did not actually ever meet Dayang, let alone receive dharma transmission from him. Instead, Touzi received dharma transmission from Fushan Fayuan, who had been a student of Dayang, but had himself had not received dharma transmission from Dayang either. In fact, Fushan had already received dharma transmission in the Linji tradition, and thus could not receive it again.

The scholar Morten Schlütter notes that this form of lineage transfer "has no real parallel in early Chan literature". This refers to the fact that Touzi was able to be considered the immediate heir to Dayang's lineage without having met him, and that Fayuan was able to hold Dayang's lineage "in trust" without actually being a bona fide heir. Schlütter further interprets Huihong's likely embellished account as an attempt to strengthen the rather weak link between Touzi and Dayang, who was the last Caodong monk recorded in the prestigious Transmission of the Lamp, in order to solidify the legitimacy of the lineage.

Buddhist titles
Preceded by Dayang Jingxuan	Caodong Chan/Sōtō Zen patriarch	Succeeded by Furong Daokai
