= Shikantaza =

Japanese translation of a Chinese term for zazen

Sōtō teacher Kōdō Sawaki in shikantaza meditation.

In Zen Buddhism, Shikantaza (只管打坐) is the practice of "just sitting." It is Dōgen's Japanese translation of the Chinese phrase zhǐguǎn dǎzuò (只管打坐 / 祇管打坐). (Note: Charles Muller, Dictionary of Buddhism, 2010.) The phrase was used by Dōgen's teacher Rujing, a monk of the Caodong school of Chan Buddhism, to refer to the meditation practice called "silent illumination" (mozhao, Chinese: 默照), or "serene reflection," famously taught by the Caodong master Hongzhi Zhengjue (1091–1157).

In Japan, the practice is associated with the Sōtō school, Dōgen's offshoot of Caodong. Some practitioners teach that shikantaza means that one should not focus attention on a specific object (such as the breath), instead "just sitting" in a state of conscious awareness. As the modern Sōtō Zen teacher Shohaku Okumura explains, "We don’t set our mind on any particular object, visualization, mantra, or even our breath itself. When we just sit, our mind is nowhere and everywhere." (Note: Similarly, according to the famous East Asian śāstra, the Awakening of Faith, one does not concentrate on the breath: "Should there be a person who desires to practice “cessation,” he should stay in a quiet place and sit erect in an even temper. [His attention should be focused] neither on breathing nor on any form or color, nor on empty space, earth, water, fire, wind, nor even on what has been seen, heard, remembered, or conceived.")

According to Buswell and Lopez, the Sōtō school presents shikantaza as a radical simplification of practice which is necessary in the degenerate age of the Dharma, or mappō. That is, rather than try to master a range of concentration techniques, such as breath counting or the investigation of koans, by simply adopting the posture of the buddhas and ancestors, the practitioner becomes identical to them in body and mind. In this way, one stabilizes oneself in "a state of full clarity and alertness, free from any specific content," which is also described as the state of "body and mind dropping off" (shinjin datsuraku). However, contemporary Sōtō authorities note that Eihei Dōgen himself explicitly rejected the fatalistic theory of mappō, viewing shikantaza not as a simplified concession for a degenerate era, but as the supreme, timeless expression of buddha-nature.

== Etymology ==
The term shikantaza is the Sino-Japanese reading of Zhǐguǎn dǎzuò (只管打坐 / 祇管打坐) "just sitting", "nothing but sitting", "meditation of just sitting", "just mind [yourself] sitting". Zhǐguǎn dǎzuò (只管打坐 / 祇管打坐) translates as follows:

- zhǐguǎn (只管, J. shikan; or 祇管, with 祇 [zhǐ] serving as a variant of 只 [zhǐ]), "by all means; merely, simply; only concerned with", "to focus exclusively on";
- dǎzuò 打坐, [Buddhism/Daoism] "sit in meditation", "to squat, sit down cross-legged", which corresponds with Sanskrit utkuṭuka-stha;

James Ishmael Ford states that "some trace the root of this word [shikantaza] to the Japanese pronunciation of Sanskrit vipassana, though this is far from certain." Shikan 只管 ("only", "just") is also not to be confused with shikan 止観 ("concentration and observation" (Note: Watanabe Toshirō (渡邊敏郎), Edmund R. Skrzypczak, and Paul Snowden, eds. (2003), Kenkyusha's New Japanese-English Dictionary (新和英大辞典), 5th edition, Kenkyusha, 1125. This bilingual dictionary lists 止観 and 21 other words pronounced shikan (e.g., 仕官 "government service" and 弛緩 "relaxation") but not shikan 只管.)) which is a practice of the Tendai sect, and translates the Sanskrit śamatha and vipaśyanā, the two basic forms or components of Buddhist meditation. (Note: The term shikan (止観) is derived from Chinese zhǐguān (止觀, "[Buddhism] keep mental calm while observing the universe" (cf. the Mohe Zhiguan)DeFrancis (2003, p. 1267)), which compounds shi or zhǐ (止 ("stop", "stabilize", "śamatha") and kan or guān (觀, "observe", "contemplate", "vipaśyanā"). An instance of the confusion of 止観 for 只管 is Steve Hagen's claim that "shi [Hagen is referring to Dōgen's '只'] means tranquility [= '止'], kan [Hagen is referring to Dōgen's '管'] means awareness [= '観'], ta means hitting exactly the right spot (not one atom off), and za means to sit."Hagen (2007, p. 189))

== Background ==
The phrase zhǐguǎn dǎzuò ("just sitting") was used by Dōgen's teacher Tiantong Rujing (1162–1228) for silent illumination (Chinese mòzhào 默照; Japanese mokushō). Koten Benson explains mòzhào (or "mo chao," according to the Wade-Giles romanization) as follows:

The first character, mo, has an element in it that means black or darkness, making the whole character signify "dark, secret, silent, serene, profound" and also "to close the lips, to become silent". The second character, chao, has as element meaning "the brightness of the sun". The whole character translates as "to reflect light, to shine on, to illume or enlighten", as well as "to reflect upon, to look upon, to have insight into". The whole term thus becomes "serene reflection", "silent illumination" or "luminescent darkness".

The centrality of this teaching within the Sōtō tradition derives from a pivotal episode reportedly occurring sometime in the early 1220s (Song dynasty) at Tiantong Mountain Monastery (天童寺, also known as Jingde Monastery 景德寺, east of modern-day Ningbo) depicting an exchange between the eminent Chinese Caodong teacher Rujing and his disciples. It is of particular importance for its account of an awakening experience by one of Rujing's Japanese disciples, Dōgen, who would later found the Sōtō Zen sect:

Then, one day during late night seated meditation, Reverend Jing entered the hall and admonished the great assembly for sleeping, saying:

"Inquiring into Zen is the sloughing off of body and mind [身心脱落]. There is no need for burning incense, making prostrations, recollecting buddhas, practicing repentances, or reading sūtras. Just sit [祇管に打坐]; only then will you attain it."

At that time, hearing this, the Master [Dōgen] immediately had a great awakening...

This exchange between Rujing and his disciples indicates that high-flung ceremony and study are unnecessary and irrelevant, and that "just sitting" is sufficient.

== Practice ==
=== Classical sources ===
"Silent illumination" or "silent reflection" was the hallmark of the Chinese Caodong school of Chan. (Note: Muller, A. Charles, ed.: The Digital_Dictionary_of_Buddhism, ed. of 04/03/2008, Chinese Readings Index (Pinyin System)) The first Chan teacher to articulate the concept of silent illumination was the Caodong master Hongzhi Zhengjue (1091—1157), who wrote an inscription entitled "silent illumination meditation" (Mokushō zen 默照禅 or Mòzhào chán 默照禪). Sheng-yen explains that

In silent illumination, "just sitting" is only the first step. While you maintain the sitting posture, you should also try to establish the "silent" state of the mind. Eventually you reach a point where the mind does not move and yet is very clear. That unmoving mind is "silent," and that clarity of mind is "illumination." This is the meaning of "silent illumination."

With the phrase shikantaza, Dōgen means "doing only zazen whole-heartedly" or "single-minded sitting." According to Merv Fowler, shikantaza is described best as "quiet sitting in open awareness, reflecting directly the reality of life." According to Austin, shikantaza is "an alert condition, performed erect, with no trace of sluggishness or drowsiness." Fred Reinhard Dallmayr writes,

Regarding practice, Dogen counseled a distinctly nonattached or nonclinging kind of action, that is, an activity completely unconcerned with benefits or the accomplishment of ulterior goals: the activity of 'just sitting' or 'nothing-but-sitting' (shikantaza) whereby self-seeking is set aside in a manner resembling a resolute 'dropping off of body and mind.'

=== Modern sources ===
Zen master John Daido Loori describes shikantaza as a challenging practice in spite of its name's simplicity. Mental strength (joriki) is not achieved through sustained concentration as in breath meditation, but through awareness of the flow of mind, without actively attempting to let go of a thought. The user must watch their thoughts, "without analyzing them, judging them, attempting to understand or categorize them," being only aware of them. According to him, this helps mental activity move on and produce samadhi.

When you're doing shikantaza you don't try to focus on anything specifically, or to make thoughts go away. You simply allow everything to be just the way it is. Thoughts come, thoughts go, and you simply watch them, you keep your awareness on them. It takes a lot of energy and persistence to sit shikantaza, to not get caught up in daydreaming. But little by little, thoughts begin to slow down, and finally they cease to arise. When the thought disappears, the thinker disappears.

Commenting on Loori's words, meditation expert Eric Harrison likens shikantaza to a psychological process of extinction, in which repeated reduction of a behavioral response eventually leads to no response.

Loori describes awareness as the one thing necessary to the practice of shikantaza. This requires a heightened state of mental alertness, which he warns cannot be maintained for extended periods of time. He recommends to practice shikantaza half an hour to an hour, then stand up and practice kinhin in order to relax the mind before sitting down and continuing.

Shunryū Suzuki states about shikantaza, "do not try to stop your mind, but leave everything as it is. Then things will not stay in your mind for so long. Things will come as they come and go as they go. Eventually your clear, empty mind will last fairly long." For his part, describing the practice's goal as being simply aware of thoughts without getting caught by them, Sean Murphy cites Taizan Maezumi as advising to "regard our thoughts as if they were clouds, watching them as they drift from one end of the mind to the other, but making no attempt to hold onto them - and when they pass over the horizon, as they inevitably will, making no attempt to grasp after them.

Jundo Cohen warns that its meaning of "just sitting" must not be taken too literally, and underlines the importance of awareness. When faced against strong emotions or anxious thoughts, Cohen instructs to simply observe them with equanimity, "treating them like passing weather clouds." At the same time, he stresses not to play with and be pulled in by thoughts. He compares shikantaza to "the children's puzzle of Chinese finger cuffs, which are escaped not by forceful effort, but by non-resistance." Only by dropping the hunt for enlightenment, accepting everything without grasping or avoiding, can enlightenment be found.

==== Similar techniques ====
A modern technique described as similar to shikantaza is called "Do Nothing Meditation" by Shinzen Young. The user is instructed to let go of all mental intentions, without trying to meditate or concentrate in any way. Any distraction or thought is allowed, unless the user feels they are intentionally thinking or doing something, in which case they must stop this intention and let it go, including any possible struggle at it. As a result, "eventually the mind feels very spacious, open, and relaxed, but also bright, clear, and vivid".

Another similar description comes from Sri Nisargadatta Maharaj, in I Am That, where he recommends "letting thoughts flow and watching them and to keep the mind quiet. The state of freedom from all thoughts will happen suddenly and by the bliss of it you shall recognize it."

Osho also described his method of meditation as, "don’t do anything... just watch whatever the mind is doing. Don't disturb it, don't prevent it, don't repress it; don't do anything at all on your part. You just be a watcher, and the miracle of watching is meditation."

== See also ==
- Buddha-nature
- Abhāvanā
- Dzogchen
- Turiya

== Sources ==
Printed sources

- Austin, James H. (1998). Zen and the Brain: Toward an Understanding of Meditation and Consciousness. MIT Press. ISBN 0-262-51109-6.
- Akishige, Yoshiharu (1977). Psychological Studies on Zen. Komazawa University Zen Institute. OCLC 5052397.
- Benson, Koten (1989), "Serene Reflection", The Journal of the Order of Buddhist Contemplatives, 4 (1): 33–35
- Buswell Jr., Robert E.; Lopez Jr., Donald S. (2014), The Princeton Dictionary of Buddhism, Princeton University Press
- Cohen, Jundo (2020). The Zen Master's Dance: A Guide to Understanding Dogen and Who You Are in the Universe. Wisdom Publications. ISBN 978-1614296461.
- Dallmayr, Fred Reinhard (1996). Beyond Orientalism: Essays on Cross-Cultural Encounter. State University of New York Press. ISBN 0-7914-3069-3. OCLC 42330289.
- Davis, Bret W. (2022). Zen Pathways: An Introduction to the Philosophy and Practice of Zen Buddhism. Oxford University Press. ISBN 978-0197573686.
- DeFrancis, John, ed. (2003). ABC Chinese-English Comprehensive Dictionary. University of Hawaii Press.
- Fischer-Schreiber, Ingrid; Schuhmacher, Stephan; Woerner, Gert (1989). The Encyclopedia of Eastern Philosophy and Religion: Buddhism, Hinduism, Taoism, Zen. Shambhala Publications. ISBN 0-87773-980-3.
- Ford, James Ishmael (2006). Zen Master Who?: A Guide to the People and Stories of Zen. Wisdom Publications. ISBN 0-86171-509-8.
- Fowler, Merv (2005). Zen Buddhism: Beliefs and Practices. Sussex Academic Press. ISBN 1-902210-42-5.
- Hagen, Steve (2007). Meditation Now Or Never. HarperOne. p. 189. ISBN 978-0-06-114329-8.
- Harrison, Eric (2017). The Foundations of Mindfulness: How to Cultivate Attention, Good Judgment, and Tranquility. Hachette. ISBN 978-1615192571.
- Leighton, Taigen Dan (2000), Cultivating the Empty Field: The Silent Illumination of Zen Master Hongzhi, Tuttle
- Loori, John Daido (2002). The Eight Gates of Zen: A Program of Zen Training. Shambhala Publications. ISBN 978-0834823907.
- Loori, John Daido (2005). Art of Just Sitting: Essential Writings on the Zen Practice of Shikantaza. Wisdom Publications. ISBN 978-0861719495.
- Shaner, David Edward (1985). The Bodymind Experience in Japanese Buddhism: A Phenomenological Perspective of Kūkai and Dōgen. State University of New York Press. ISBN 0-88706-061-7. OCLC 59254799.
- Shengyen (2008). The Method of No-Method: The Chan Practice of Silent Illumination. Shambhala. ISBN 978-1-59030-575-1.

Web-sources
