= Rujing =

Caodong Buddhist monk

Tiāntóng Rújìng 天童如淨
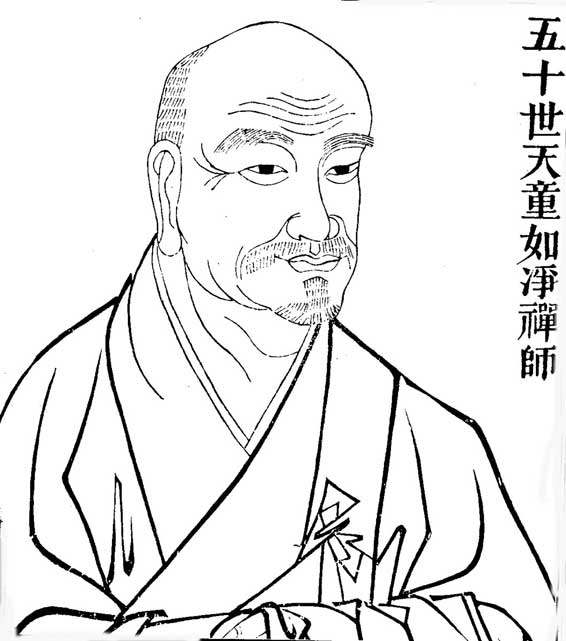
- Title: Chán master

Personal life
- Born: 8 August 1163
- Died: 18 August 1228 (aged 65)

Religious life
- Religion: Buddhism
- School: Caodong/Sōtō

Senior posting
- Teacher: Xuedou Zhijian
- Predecessor: Xuedou Zhijian
- Successor: Eihei Dōgen
- Students: Eihei Dōgen Jakuen Wuwai Yiyuan

Rujing

Chinese name
- Chinese: 天童如淨
Transcriptions
Standard Mandarin
- Hanyu Pinyin: Tiāntóng Rújìng
Wu
- Wugniu: thie^{1} don^{2} zyu^{2} zin^{4}
Yue: Cantonese
- Jyutping: tin^{1} tung^{4} jyu^{4} zing^{6}

Japanese name
- Shinjitai: 天童如浄
Transcriptions
- Romanization: Tendō Nyojō

Tiantong Rujing (1163–1228) was a Caodong Buddhist monk living in Jingde Temple (pinyin: Jǐngdé Sì; romaji: Keitokuji) on Tiantong Mountain (Chinese: 天童山; pinyin: Tiāntóng Shān; romaji: Tendōzan) in Yinzhou District, Ningbo. He taught and gave dharma transmission to Sōtō Zen founder Dōgen as well as early Sōtō monk Jakuen (Chinese: 寂圓; pinyin: Jìyuán).

His teacher was Xuedou Zhijian (Chinese: 雪竇智鑑; pinyin: Xuědòu Zhìjiān, 1105–1192), who was the sixteenth-generation dharma descendant of Huineng.

According to Keizan, when Ruijing became a leader, he didn't put himself above the other monks. He wore the black surplice and robe of a monk. He was given a purple vestment of honor by the emperor of China, but he declined it. Even after reaching enlightenment, he was willing to clean the bathroom.

He is traditionally the originator of the terms shikantaza and shinjin-datsuraku ("casting off of body and mind").

Buddhist titles
Preceded by Xuedou Zhijian	Caodong Chan/Sōtō Zen patriarch 1192–1227	Succeeded by Dōgen
