= Dayang Jingxuan =

Dayang Jingxuan 大陽警玄
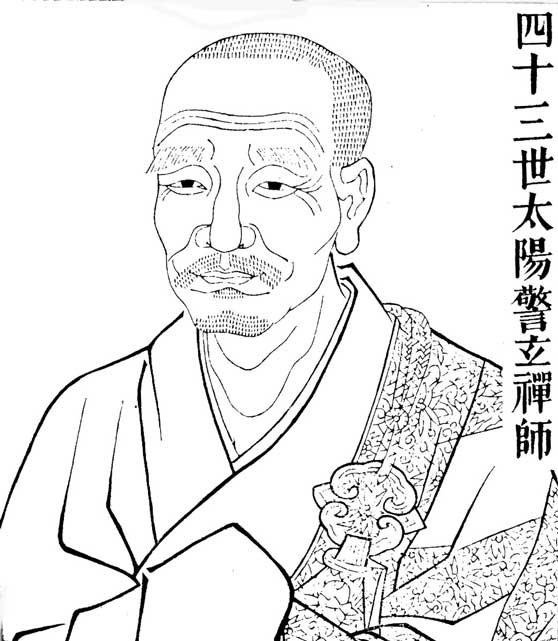
- Title: Chán master

Personal life
- Born: 943 Jiangxia, China
- Died: 1027

Religious life
- Religion: Chán/Zen
- School: Caodong/Sōtō

Senior posting
- Teacher: Liangshan Yuanguan
- Predecessor: Liangshan Yuanguan
- Successor: Touzi Yiqing
- Students: Fushan Fayuan Yinyang Qingpou

Dayang Jingxuan (simplified Chinese: 大阳警玄; traditional Chinese: 大陽警玄; Japanese: Taiyo Keigen) was a Chan (Zen) Buddhist monk during the early Song dynasty. During his life, he was apparently the only living teacher representing Caodong/Sōtō school, and he was the last monk of that tradition to be mentioned in the influential Transmission of the Lamp, compiled in 1004. However, as that work was compiled during his lifetime, it lacked biographical information. A biography did not appear until the Xudeng lu of 1101. He left his birth city to become a monk at Chongxiao Temple in Jinling. His teacher there was named Zhitong, but Dayang soon left when he was 19. He studied with Yuanjiao Liaoyi for a time, but eventually moved on, finally settling on Liangshan Yuanguan as his teacher.

Dayang Jingxuan is an important figure in the Caodong/Sōtō Zen lineage because he was apparently the only remaining representative of the Caodong/Sōtō tradition during his lifetime. Furthermore, he is significant because the lineage effectively died out with him, but through highly unusual means, the lineage was passed on to someone he had never met. Juefan Huihong's biographical compilation of 1119, the Chanlin sengbao zhuan (Chronicle of the Sangha Treasure in the Groves of Chan), suggests that Touzi Yiqing was the "true son", or student, of Dayang. The Xudeng lu of 1101 lists Touzi and nine others as disciples of Dayang. However, it explains that Touzi did not actually receive dharma transmission from Dayang, but from Fushan Fayuan. Fushan had been a student of Dayang, but he himself had not received dharma transmission from Dayang either. The scholar Morten Schlütter notes that this form of lineage transfer "has no real parallel in early Chan literature". This refers to the fact that Touzi was able to be considered the immediate heir to Dayang's lineage without having met him, and that Fayuan was able to hold Dayang's lineage "in trust" without actually being a bona fide heir. Schlütter further interprets Huihong's likely embellished account as an attempt to strengthen the rather weak link between Touzi and the last Caodong monk recorded in the Transmission of the Lamp in order to solidify the legitimacy of the lineage.

Buddhist titles
Preceded by Liangshan Yuanguan	Caodong Chan/Sōtō Zen patriarch	Succeeded by Touzi Yiqing
