= Hongzhi Zhengjue =

Chinese Buddhist monk (1091–1157)

Hongzhi Zhengjue 宏智正覺
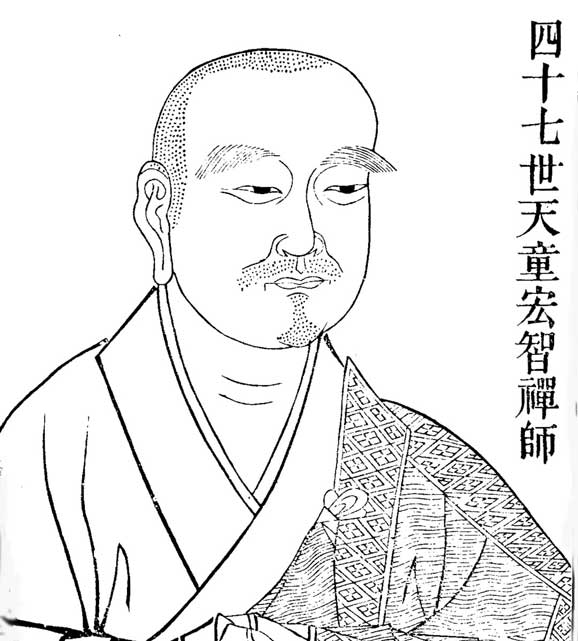
- Title: Chan master

Personal life
- Born: 1091 Xizhou (now in Shanxi Province), China
- Died: 1157 (aged 65–66)

Religious life
- Religion: Buddhism
- School: Chan

Senior posting
- Teacher: Danxia Zichun
- Predecessor: Danxia Zichun

Hongzhi Zhengjue (Chinese: 宏智正覺; pinyin: Hóngzhì Zhēngjué; Wade–Giles: Hung-chih Cheng-chueh, Japanese: Wanshi Shōgaku), also sometimes called Tiantong Zhengjue (Chinese: 天童正覺; pinyin: Tiāntóng Zhēngjué; Japanese: Tendō Shōgaku) (1091–1157), was an influential Chinese Chan Buddhist monk who authored or compiled several influential texts. Hongzhi's conception of silent illumination is of particular importance to the Chinese Caodong Chan and Japanese Sōtō Zen schools. Hongzhi was also the author of the Book of Equanimity, an important collection of kōans.

== Life ==
According to the account given in Taigen Dan Leighton's Cultivating the Empty Field, Hongzhi was born to a family named Li in Xizhou, present-day Shanxi province. He left home at the age of eleven to become a monk, studying under Caodong master Kumu Facheng (枯木法成), among others, including Yuanwu Keqin, author of the famous kōan collection, the Blue Cliff Record.

In 1129, Hongzhi began teaching at the Jingde monastery of the Tiantong Temple, where he remained for nearly thirty years, until shortly before his death in 1157, when he ventured down the mountain to bid farewell to his supporters.

== Texts ==
The main text associated with Hongzhi is a collection of one hundred of his kōans called the Book of Equanimity (Chinese: 從容録; pinyin: Cóngróng Lù; Japanese: 従容録; rōmaji: Shōyōroku). This book was compiled after his death by Wansong Xingxiu (1166–1246) at the urging of the Khitan statesman Yelü Chucai (1190–1244), and first published in 1224, with commentaries by Wansong. This book is regarded as one of the key texts of the Caodong school of Zen Buddhism. A collection of Hongzhi's philosophical texts has also been translated by Leighton.

Hongzhi is often referred to as an important exponent of Silent Illumination Chan (Chinese: 黙照禅, pinyin: Mòzhào chán, rōmaji: Mokushō zen). A number of English translations exist of his influential inscription on silent illumination Mozhao Ming (黙照铭). (Link below.)

Eihei Dōgen—the founder of the Sōtō school of Zen in Japan—quotes Hongzhi in his work more than any other Zen figure.

== Sources ==
- Cultivating the Empty Field: The Silent Illumination of Zen Master Hongzhi. Edited and translated by Taigen Dan Leighton. Tuttle Library of Enlightenment. Boston; Rutland, Vermont; Tokyo: Tuttle Publishing, 2000 (revised, expanded edition). ISBN 0-8048-3240-4
- The Book of Equanimity: Illuminating Classic Zen Koans. Translation and commentary by Gerry Shishin Wick. Boston: Wisdom Publication[s], 2005. ISBN 978-0-86171-387-5
- The Book of Serenity. Translated by Thomas Cleary. Hudson, New York: Lindisfarne Press, 1990.
- Guo Gu (果谷 Guǒ Gǔ), Silent Illumination: A Chan Buddhist Path to Natural Awakening. Boulder, Colorado: Shambhala, 2021. ISBN 978-1-61180-872-8. Contains translations of passages from Hóngzhì Zhēngjué's writings on Silent Illumination (默照, mòzhào; Japanese: mokushō).
