= Bassui Tokushō =

Mediaeval Japanese Buddhist monk

- Title: Rōshi

Personal life
- Born: 1327 Kanagawa Prefecture, Japan
- Died: 1387 (aged 59–60)

Religious life
- Religion: Buddhism
- School: Rinzai

Bassui Tokushō (抜隊 得勝; 1327–1387) was a Rinzai Zen Master born in modern-day Kanagawa Prefecture who had trained with Sōtō and Rinzai Zen-masters. Bassui was tormented by the question "Who is the one that sees, hears, and understands?" This question was also central in his teachings, and still inspires present-day Zen-practitioners.

== Biography ==
=== Birth and early childhood ===
Bassui was born in 1327 in Sagami (today's Kanagawa Prefecture) during a time of civil war in Japan. These were the ruling years of Emperor Go-Daigo, who had begun reclaiming control of the country back from the Hōjō clan of the Kamakura shogunate. He was abandoned by his mother and left alone in a field, after she had a dream during her pregnancy in which she had a premonition that her baby would be born a demon. A servant of the family retrieved the infant and raised him, though it is plausible his mother left him there knowing the servant would come to get him, making the ritual of abandoning the newborn a formality in which evil spirits were dispelled.

=== Start of religious quest ===
At the age of seven his father died, and Bassui became tormented by the question "What is a soul?", which turned into the question "Who is the one that hears, sees and understands?" These are questions he would struggle with for a good portion of his life. He would pursue this style of inquiry in meditation, one day realizing that there's nothing that can be called a "soul." This insight lifted his burden for a while, but his question was reinvigorated when he read the phrase "The mind is host, the body is guest," realizing that this host must then be the one who hears, sees and understands, but not knowing what exactly this would be then.

When Bassui was twenty he undertook training at Jufukuji Temple under a Zen Master Oko, but did not ordain as a monk until nine years before becoming one. Once a monk he would not wear a monk's robes or recite the sutras as everyone was doing, but just practiced meditation.

At the end of his stay at Jufukuji, Bassui sought to find the hermit monk Tokukei Jisha whom he heard lived amongst the mountains. Upon first meeting each other Tokukei appeared taken aback by Bassui's appearance (a shaved head yet regular clothing). Tokukei asked Bassui why he was not wearing his robes, to which Bassui explained he had no need for them. Bassui then expressed the true purpose of his quest, about his desire to attain enlightenment for the benefit of others. This endeared Bassui to Tokukei, and the two developed a strong friendship following this initial encounter.

=== Break-through and confirmation ===
Around the age of 30 he had a breakthrough, which was confirmed in 1358 by Kozan Mongo, when Bassui was 31 years old. Around this time Bassui finally started to wear Buddhist robes. After spending a year with Tokukei doing intensive zazen, Bassui set out to meet Koho Kakumyo, a renowded teacher who had studied in China under Zhongfeng Mingben, and also with the renowned Soto-teacher Keizan Jokin. Studying with Koho, Bassui had another, profound awakening, which was confirmed by Koho at the age of 32. After this, Bassui started to wander again, and built a hermitage at Nanasawa.

In 1361, thirty-five years old, Bassui left for a hermitage in Kii province but was sidetracked at Eigenji temple, where he met the Zen master and haiku poet Jakushitsu Genkō. In 1362 he met the Soto-teacher Gasan Jōseki, who recognized Bassui's understanding, but Bassui declined to receive dharma-transmission from Gasan. For many years after this Bassui lived in many hermitages all over Japan, where his reputation as a clear teacher spread by word of mouth.

=== Final years ===
In 1378 Bassui settled for a bit in Kai province, but by now the audience coming to see him was growing so fast that it became hard to continue living his life as a hermit. So Bassui moved to Enzan, where he founded a temple called Kogakuan at which he lived and taught for the remainder of his life. Bassui never did like referring to Kogakuan as a temple or monastery, however, and would often just refer to it as a hermitage. At Kogakuan, Wadeigassi, "Mud and water", consisted of talks to his students, was recorded, which was published in 1386, a year before his death. He developed a great faith in Kannon, the bodhisattva of compassion. In the Wadeigassui he refers to Kannon as characterized in the Suramgama Sutra: "He was a person who for every sound he heard contemplated the mind of the hearer, realizing his own nature." (Note: Compare Hakuins "sound of a single hand," which is also a reference to Kanzeon. Ken Holmes, Chenrezik - Bodhisattva of Compassion: "The Suramgama Sutra tells how, in ages long gone by, the bodhisattva followed a certain Buddha Avalokitesvara, from whom he took his name, who instructed him to focus his meditation on the faculty of hearing. By analysing what at first seemed to be two things - external sound and the inner faculty of hearing - the bodhisattva soon recognised their inseparability; their non-duality. Neither could be found to have existence on its own and hence each was devoid of existence. By then pursuing this voidness, with direct awareness rather than intellectual analysis, the bodhisattva understood the whole question of consciousness and attained successive degrees of enlightenment, thereby acquiring extraordinary powers to help others. We find these powers, which are embodied in his mantra Om mani padme hung, also mentioned in the Lotus Sutra. They enable him to manifest to anyone, in forms having direct relevance to their needs.)

In 1387 (at the age of 61), as Bassui was sitting in zazen meditation among his followers, he turned to them and said twice to his students: "Look directly. What is this? Look in this manner and you won't be fooled." He then died.

== Teachings ==
Bassui had a preference for reclusiveness and small hermitages, avoiding the large monasteries. In this, he seems to have been influenced by teachers who had a connection with the Chinese Zen master Chuho Myohon (Zhongfeng Mingben, 1263–1323).

In the Wadeigassi, great stress is placed on the question "Who is hearing the sound?", equivalent to seeing into [one's] nature. While not part of any of the great koan-collections, it has repeatedly been treated as such. Yamada Koun, dharma heir of Hakuun Yasutani, used it for his practice after he had completed formal koan-study. It is a practice, or quest, which is also pointed to in older Buddhist sources, 'turning the light within', or'turning back the radiance', seeing one's nature, e.g. sunyata or Buddha-nature.

Bassui was critical of koans, warning that they should only be studied once one had gained some insight in their inherent nature.

== See also ==
- Buddhism in Japan
- List of Rinzai Buddhists
- Hakuin Ekaku
- Matsuo Bashō
- Ryōkan

== Sources ==
- Braverman, Arthur (2002), Mud and Water: The Teachings of Zen Master Bassui, Wisdom Publications, ISBN 0-86171-320-6
- Hoffman, Yoel (1998). Japanese Death Poems: Written by Zen Monks and Haiku Poets on the Verge of Death. Tuttle Publishing. ISBN 978-0-8048-3179-6.
- Kapleau, Philip (1989). The three pillars of Zen.
