= Kōan (Muromachi period) =

Japanese era (1361–1362)

Kōan (康安) was a Japanese era name (年号, nengō, lit. year name) of the Northern Court during the Era of Northern and Southern Courts after Enbun and before Jōji. This period spanned the years from March 1361 through September 1362. The emperor in Kyoto was Go-Kōgon-tennō (後光厳天皇). Go-Kōgon's Southern Court rival in Yoshino during this time-frame was Go-Murakami-tennō (後村上天皇)

== Nanboku-chō overview ==
The Imperial seats during the Nanboku-chō period were in relatively close proximity, but geographically distinct. They were conventionally identified as: Northern capital : Kyoto; Southern capital : Yoshino.

During the Meiji period, an Imperial decree dated March 3, 1911 established that the legitimate reigning monarchs of this period were the direct descendants of Emperor Go-Daigo through Emperor Go-Murakami, whose Southern Court (南朝, nanchō) had been established in exile in Yoshino, near Nara.

Until the end of the Edo period, the militarily superior pretender-Emperors supported by the Ashikaga shogunate had been mistakenly incorporated in Imperial chronologies despite the undisputed fact that the Imperial Regalia were not in their possession.

This illegitimate Northern Court (北朝, hokuchō) had been established in Kyoto by Ashikaga Takauji.

== Change of era ==
- 1361, also called Kōan gannen (康安元年): The new era name was created to mark an event or series of events. The previous era ended and the new one commenced in Embun 6.

In this time frame, Shōhei (1346–1370) was a Southern Court equivalent nengō,

== Events of the Kōan era ==
- 1361 (Kōan 1, 6th month): Snowfall was unusually heavy; and there was also a disastrous fire in Kyoto as well as a violent earthquake.
- 1361 (Kōan 1): Eigen-ji, a Zen Buddhist temple located in modern-day Shiga prefecture, was founded by Sasaki Ujiyori. Its first Abbot was Jakushitsu Genko.
- 1362 (Kōan 2): Hosokawa Kiyouji and Kusunoki Masanori attack Kyoto, Ashikaga Yoshiakira flees, but regains the capital in twenty days.

== Notes ==
Preceded by Embun	Era or nengō Kōan; 1361–1362	Succeeded by Jōji
