= Muqi =

Chinese painter

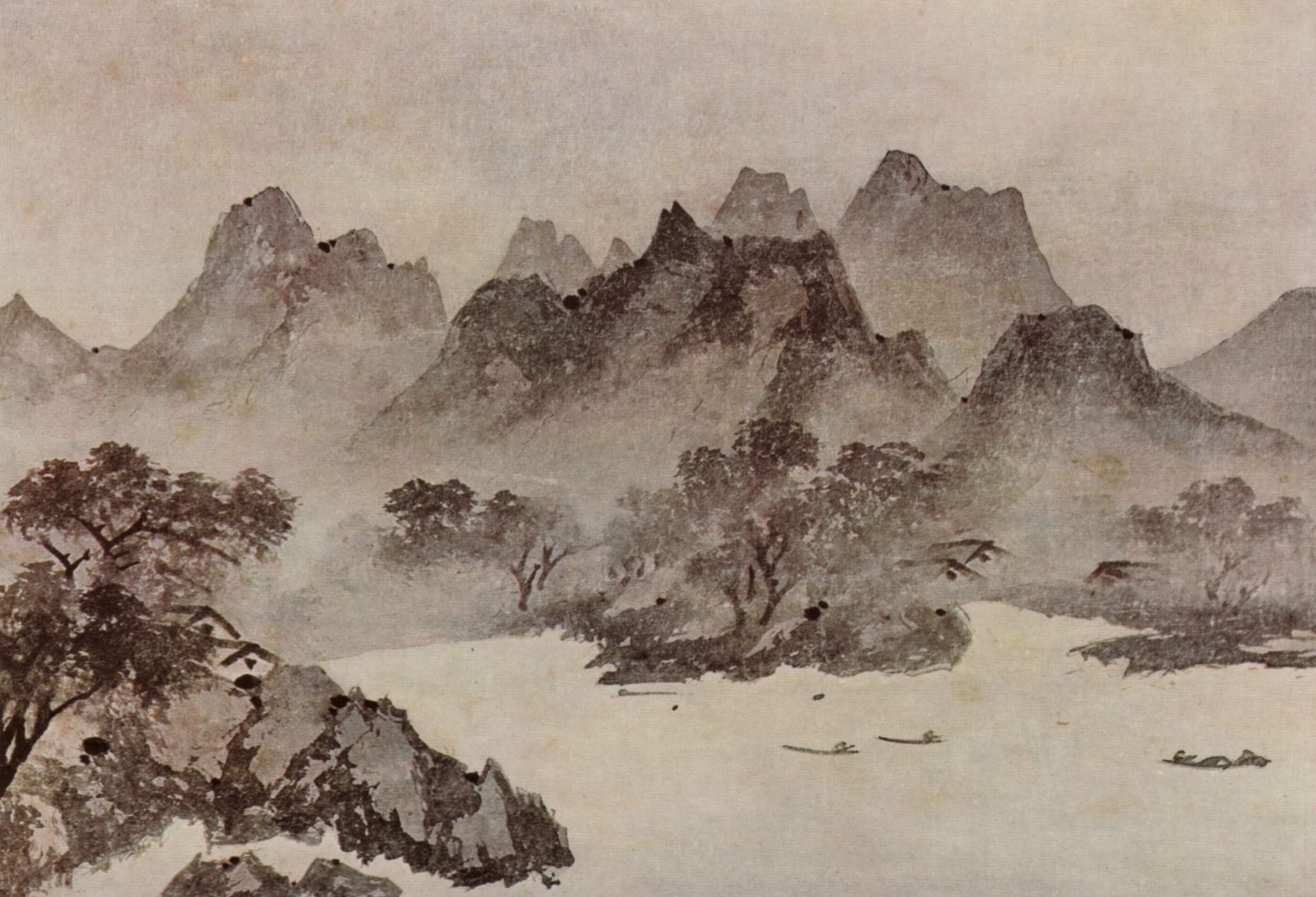
Muqi, Detail of dusk over fisher's village, from the handscroll "Eight Views of Xiao and Xiang", circa 1250, Collected in Nezu Art Museum

Muqi or Muxi (Chinese: 牧谿; Japanese: Mokkei; 1210?–1269?), also known as Fachang (Chinese: 法常), was a Chinese Chan Buddhist monk and painter who lived in the 13th century, around the end of the Southern Song dynasty (1127–1279). Today, he is considered to be one of the greatest Chan painters in history. His ink paintings, such as the Daitokuji triptych and Six Persimmons are regarded as essential Chan paintings. Muqi's style of painting has also profoundly impacted painters from later periods to follow, especially monk painters in Japan.

According to Chinese secondary sources, Muqi's surname was thought to be Li. "Muqi" was his art name, and "Fachang" was his formal name in the monastery system.

== Biography ==
Muqi was born in the early 13th century, approximately around 1200–1210, toward the end of Southern Song Dynasty in China. According to Dr. Aaron Rio, specific life details of Muqi are commonly unknown. However, the scholar stated that Muqi was initially from Sichuan, China, which is known from his signature, "The monk from Shu [Sichuan], Fachang, respectfully made this," (蜀僧法常瑾制) on one of his most renowned paintings, Guanyin, Crane, and Gibbons. Muqi was also identified as the disciple of the esteemed Chan master, Wuzhun Shifan (1177–1249), who was also from Sichuan. The apprenticeship was established at a temple in Mount Qingcheng in Sichuan.

After starting his early life as a monk in the monastery in Sichuan, Muqi later moved to the capital city of Southern Song Dynasty, Hangzhou. He was actively involved in monastery events, including the reformation of the Liu Tong (六桐) Monastery near the West Lake area. Although Muqi was often associated with Liutong Temple, no primary sources have been found to support the specific monastery Muqi once lived. Nevertheless, Muqi's memorial portrait was placed on Changxiang Lane where the Liutong Temple was located and prospered. According to the tradition of storing the monk's memorial portrait at the temple of his closest association, Liutong Temple, therefore, became closely related to Muqi. The exact date of Muqi's death is unknown but it is thought to be during the Zhiyuan era from 1264 to 1294.

== Paintings attributed to Muqi ==
Significant works attributed to Muqi are listed as follows—presently in the Daitokuji in Kyoto are a triptych of Guanyin, Crane, and Gibbons; Tiger; Dragon; and the much-reproduced Six Persimmons. Other works sometimes attributed to Muqi or as being "in the style of Muqi" include various nature studies, for example, the four scenes from the landscape painting Eight Views of Xiao and Xiang, and a Luohan painting in the Seikado Museum.

=== The Triptych: Guanyin, Crane, and Gibbons ===
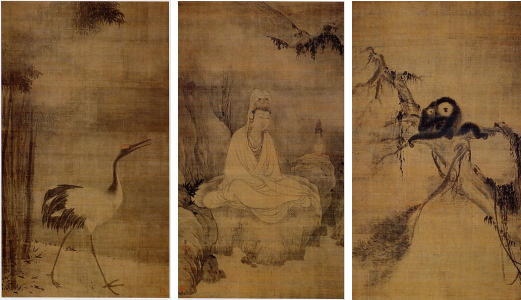
Muqi, Guanyin, Crane, and Gibbons, S. Song (Chinese), 13th century, set of three hanging scrolls, ink and color on silk, H: 173.9-174.2 cm., Collected in Daitokuji, Kyoto, Japan. Designated National Treasure

Muqi's triptych of Guanyin, Crane, and Gibbons at Daitokuji in Kyoto, Japan, is considered as one of Muqi's iconic works. The white-robed Guanyin was depicted from a three-quarter perspective as the centerpiece of the triptych. Sitting against a cliff with hands and legs covered by loosely folded draperies of the robe, Guanyin is wearing lavishly decorated headwear and jewelry to show her status as a Bodhisattva. The willow tree twig is placed on his left side. The image of Muqi's "white-robed Guanyin" has also conveyed a unique situation when Guanyin was sitting by the water under the moon. Muqi's signature "respectfully made by the monk Fachang of Shu [Sichuan]" was signed on the lower left corner of the painting along with the seal of "Muqi". The crane is portrayed in the left painting of the triptych with its body leaning forward to the right. It is galloping loudly with its head lifted, neck stretched, and beaks widely open. On the other side of the Guanyin painting rests the Gibbons painting. A mother gibbon is sitting on a withered tree branch, holding a baby gibbon in her right arm while grasping the tree branch with her left.

No specific arrival dates of the three paintings has been recorded when they were shipped from China to Japan. The three artworks were first mentioned as a triptych in the Inryoken Nichiroku (蔭涼轩日録), the daily record of events and activities taking place in the Inryoken pavilion, in 1466. Later in the 16th century, the paintings were donated by Taigen Soshin to Daitokuji. They were considered to have been initially painted as a set by Muqi evident by the poem cited by Wuzhun on the Guanyin painting. Nevertheless, other than the fourth verse, only Guanyin and the gibbons were mentioned in the poem. Hence, according to scholars, Wuzhun's poem seems to have weakened the theory of the three paintings being created as a triptych. Moreover, as Nancy Wei mentioned, since the Guanyin painting is more severely damaged than the other two, the three works may actually be produced during different time periods. However, the art historian, Fukui, has pointed out the correspondence of the environmental settings in the three paintings, which may become evidence to support the paintings been created as a triptych from the very beginning.

=== Six Persimmons ===
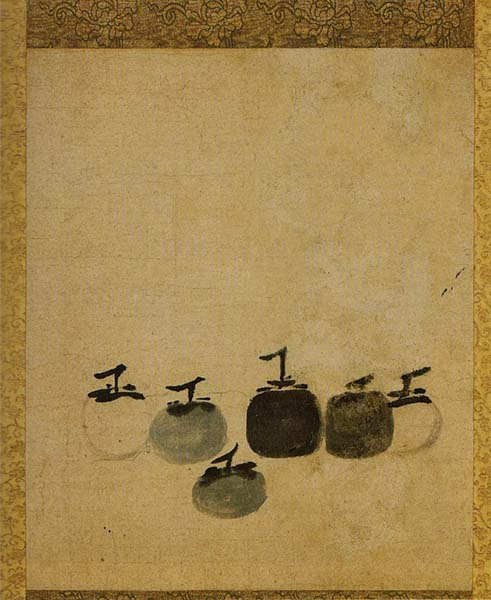
Muqi, Six Persimmons, 13th century, Southern Song (Chinese), Collected in Daitokuji, Kyoto, Japan

The Six Persimmons is perceived as another major work of Muqi's. Information on the painting is rarely found before it was given to the Ryoko-in, a sub-temple of Daitokuji, as a gift for the temple's establishment in 1606 during the Momoyama period. Since tea ceremonies were often held in Ryoko-in, the painting has been entirely associated with tea events consequently. Meanings behind the painting are related with the number "six" associated with tastes, thoughts, wisdom, ways, and patriarchs of the Chan school. As the art historian, Laurence Sickman stated, the painting has given great emphasis to the meaning behind the persimmons aligning with the fundamental nature of Buddhism. It has captured the instantaneous vision of the world from the painter. In the 20th century, prints of Six Persimmons were frequently produced as book covers and wall posters. In the meantime, Six Persimmons, together with other Zen Buddhism paintings, has brought the wave of Zen fascination to the West. Perceived as a masterpiece of Chan art embodying the essence of Chan philosophy, Six Persimmons has been analyzed by multiple scholars from the West. Arthur Waley, the English orientalist and sinologist who contributed to the translation of Chinese and Japanese poetry into English, has described the painting as the "passion... congealed into a stupendous calm."

== Muqi's reception in China and Japan ==
Muqi is honored as the originator of Chan painting. His works are considered among the most expressive of the genre, and his celebrated Six Persimmons has been called "the most quintessentially Chan painting."

Modern critics consider Muqi prominently among the painters who transmitted the tradition of monochrome ink Song literati paintings to the subsequent Yuan dynasty (1271–1368). In his own time, however, Muqi was ignored by mainstream Song society, and received mainly negative comments in the Yuan period. His paintings represented Song "naturalism," which contradicted the trend back to classicism led by Zhao Mengfu in the later Yuan. His style was criticized as "sketchy, unsophisticated, and coarse" and "inappropriate to be displayed in monasteries" by Yuan critics like Xia Wenyuan.

By contrast, Muqi found a more appreciative audience in Japan. His works were extensively collected and brought from China to Japan since the 14th century. They are listed in Japanese Zen temple inventories, such as Myoshinji and Engakuji, as well as in the Ashikaga shogunate collection. Perceived as the most prominent transmitter of Chinese culture and art, Muqi was admired and followed by a large crowd of Japanese painters—for example, the Zen painter Mokuan Reien. Muqi was the best known and the most celebrated Chan painter during the Kamakura period (1185–1333) and the Nanbokucho period (1336–1392). Known as "Mokkei" or "the Reverend" in Japan, Muqi and his style deeply affected a whole generation of Japanese painters in the use of brushstrokes and motifs. The ink bird-and-flower screen, an important motif during the Muromachi period (1336–1573), was popularized by Muqi with his triptych painting Guanyin, Crane, and Gibbons. The "Muqi mode", his boneless style of painting without ink outlines, was widely used by Japanese painters and was tied to the Zen idea of naturalism and spontaneous enlightenment.

== Works by Muqi ==
- Dragon; Tiger, 1250-1279, collection of the Cleveland Museum of Art

== Bibliography ==
=== Books ===
- Barnhart, Richard M., 1934. 1997. Three Thousand Years of Chinese Painting. Beijing; New Haven; Yale University Press, ISBN 9780300094473.
- Lachman, Charles. 2005. Art. In Lopez, Donald S. Critical Terms for the Study of Buddhism. University of Chicago Press, ISBN 9780226493145.
- Levine, Gregory P. A. 2017. Long Strange Journey. University of Hawaii Press, ISBN 9780824858056.
- Loehr, Max. 1980. The Great Painters of China. 1st U.S. ed. New York: Harper & Row, ISBN 9780064353267.
- Teisuke, Toda. 1973. Mokkei and Gyokkan, Great Compendium of India Ink Paintings, vol. 3, Kodansha.

=== Dissertations ===
- Rio, Aaron M. 2015. Ink Painting in Medieval Kamakura. ProQuest Dissertations Publishing.
- Wey, Nancy. 1974. Mu-chʻi and Zen Painting. University of Chicago.
- Wu, Xiaojin. 2011. Metamorphosis of Form and Meaning: Ink Bird-and-flower Screens in Muromachi Japan. ProQuest Dissertations.
