= Tessō Keishū =

Tessō Keishū (鉄叟 景秀; 1496–1580) was a monk of the Sengoku–Shokuho period.

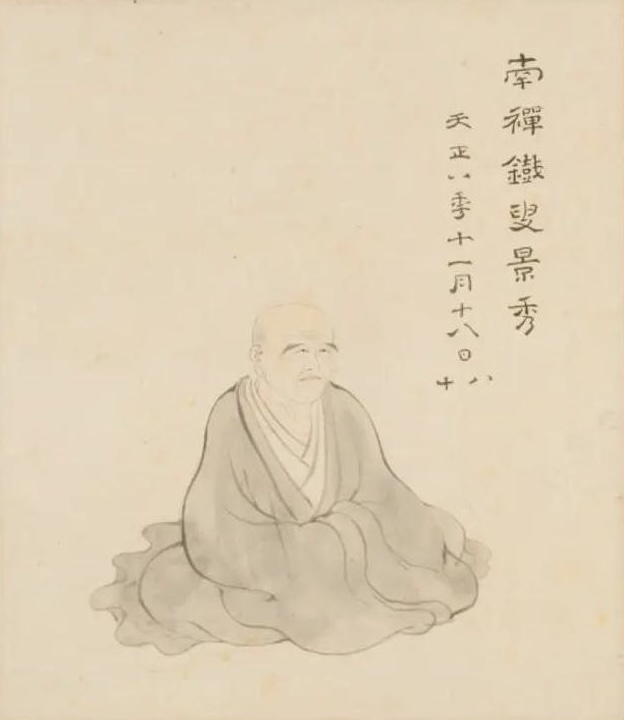

Born in 1496, he belonged to the Rinzai sect of Zen Buddhism. He succeeded to the Dharma of Reichū Zen'ei of Eigen-ji in Ōmi. He served as abbot of Kennin-ji and Nanzen-ji in Kyoto, the top of Rinzai Zen establishment known collectively as the Five Mountains (Gosan). At one point he resided at Shōmyō-ji in Hino. In 1579, at the age of 84 and already deaf, he was appointed chief judge by Oda Nobunaga. He also served as judge at the Azuchi religious debate, later confessing to Nobunaga that he had not even heard it. He died on the 18th day of the 11th month of 1580, at the age of 85.
