= Meihō Sotetsu =

Meihō Sotetsu 明峰素哲
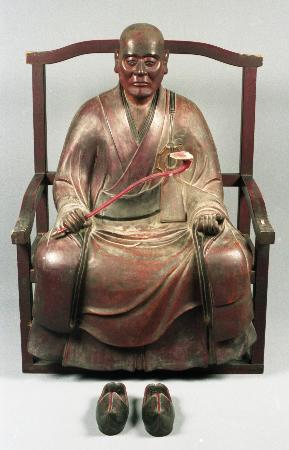
- Wooden statue of Meihō Sotetsu held at the temple Yōkōji in Ishikawa Prefecture. It is believed to have been made during the Northern and Southern Courts Period (1336-1392). It was designated an Ishikawa Prefecture Cultural Property in 1993.
- Title: Zen Master

Personal life
- Born: 1277
- Died: 1350 (aged 72–73)

Religious life
- Religion: Buddhism
- School: Sōtō

Senior posting
- Teacher: Keizan Jōkin; Tettsū Gikai
- Predecessor: Keizan Jōkin
- Successor: Daichi Sokei; Shugan Dōchin
- Students: Daichi Sokei Shugan Dōchin

Meihō Sotetsu (明峰素哲) (1277-1350) was a Japanese Sōtō Zen monk who lived during the late Kamakura period and early Muromachi period. He practiced with Keizan Jōkin, often considered the second most important figure in Sōtō Zen after Eihei Dōgen, for twenty-nine years and ultimately became his primary successor.

Meihō began his time with Keizan in 1294 at the temple Daijōji in Kanazawa. Keizan's teacher, Tettsū Gikai, remained abbot of Daijōji until 1298, when the abbotship passed to Keizan. Though retired, Gikai remained at Daijōji until his death in 1309. Gikai had familial ties with the Togashi family that patronized Daijōji; when he died, frictions apparently ensued between the Togashi family and Keizan. About two years after Gikai's death, in the tenth month of 1311, Keizan gave the abbotship of Daijōji to Meihō, along with Dōgen's okesa that had been handed on to him from Gikai in 1295. He claimed that Meihō had been Gikai's true choice for the position. Keizan left to found the temple Yōkōji on the nearby Noto Peninsula. However, for an unknown reason, Meihō was forced to leave the position at the insistence of Daijōji's lay patrons. He was replaced by the Rinzai monk Kyōō Unryō. It is not entirely clear when Kyōō took over, however, and the whereabouts of Meihō are not mentioned until 1323, when he arrived at Yōkōji after coming from Kyoto, where he had recently performed memorial services for Eisai, one of Dōgen's teachers, at Kennin-ji.

Meihō became the abbot of Yōkōji in the eighth month 1325, just one week before Keizan's death. Keizan had instructed that his disciples take turns holding the position of abbot of Yōkōji, so Meihō left the position to Mugai Chikō (d. 1351), another of Keizan's students, around the year 1339. At that time, Meihō was able to return to Daijōji. Meanwhile, after each of Keizan's primary disciples (the others being Gasan Jōseki and Kōan Shinkan) had taken a turn as abbot of Yōkōji, they each began rotating their own disciples through the abbotship, again in accordance with Keizan's instructions. However, the system had broken down by 1379, and from that year the next ten abbots of Yōkōji were all descendants of Meihō's lineage. This appears to have been part of a heated rivalry for control of the Sōtō school between Meihō's line with the temples Yōkōji and Daijōji under their control on the one hand, and Gasan Jōseki's line, which control the temple Sōjiji, on the other.

Sōjiji would ultimately prove to be the more influential temple, as students in Gasan's lineage fanned out across Japan, founding many new temples that proved long-lived and successful. Meihō's successors, on the other hand, mostly stayed in the north-central region of the country around Yōkōji and Daijōji. There was one notable exception; Daichi Sokei founded a temple in the Higo Province of Kyushu in southern Japan. However, his lineage proved short lived after also losing the support of his patrons.

Meihō was given an elaborate funeral in 1350 in which some seventy-two items were used to decorate his cremation pyre, suggesting an increase in wealth at the main Sōtō temples since the time of Dōgen. The funeral also displayed an increase in the use of esoteric rituals, such as the chanting of the Nīlakaṇṭha Dhāraṇī, Śūraṅgama mantra, and Mantra of Light. These were each chanted by a group of 100 monks who did so continuously with multiple shifts. After his death, Meihō continued to be invoked as a posthumous preceptor during ordination ceremonies so that he would continue to accrue merit from the rituals.
