= Zhongfeng Mingben =

Chinese Chan Buddhist master

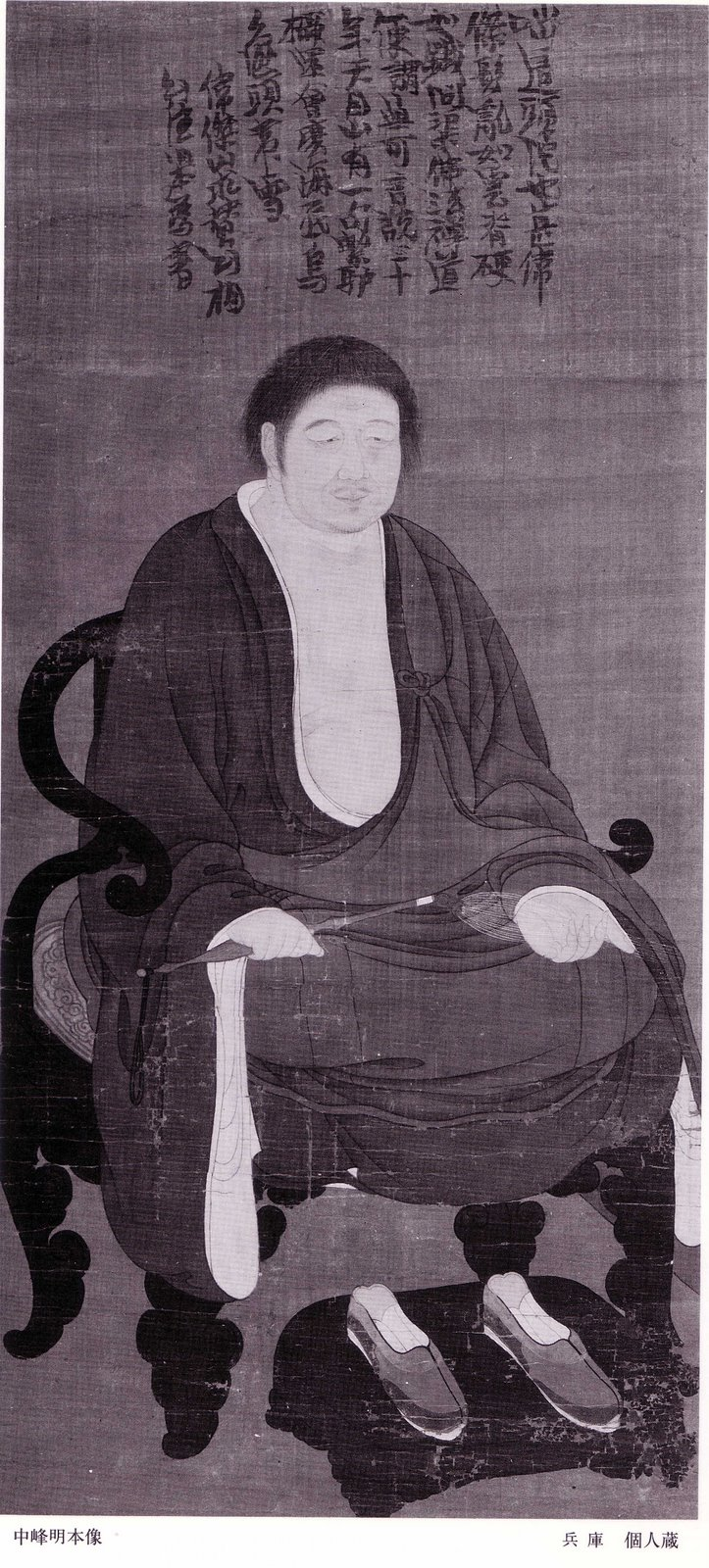

Personal life
- Born: 1263
- Died: 1323 (aged 59–60)
- Other name: Chung-feng Ming-pen (Wade Giles)

Religious life
- Religion: Buddhism
- School: Linji

Senior posting
- Teacher: Gaofeng Yuanmiao
- Students: Kosen Ingen, Kohō Kakumyō, Jakushitsu Genkō,

Zhongfeng Mingben (Chinese: 中峰明本; Wade–Giles: Chung-feng Ming-pen; Japanese: Chūhō Myōhon), 1263–1323 was a Chan Buddhist master who lived at the beginning of Yuan China. He adhered to the rigorous style of the Linji school and influenced Zen through several Japanese teachers who studied under him.

== Biography ==
Zhongfeng Mingben's family name was Sun. He was the youngest of seven children. His mother died when he was nine years old. Already in his teenage years he wanted to become a monk. From fifteen he observed the layman's Five Precepts. His left hand became mutilated when, in his youth he burned the little finger as a sacrifice to the Buddha. This may have been inspired by chapter 23 of the Lotus Sutra:

If there is one, opening up his thought, wishes to attain Anuttarā samyaksaṃbodhi, if he can burn a finger or a toe as an offering to a Buddhastupa, he shall exceed one who uses realm or walled city, wife or children, or even all the lands, mountains, forests, rivers, ponds, and sundry precious objects in the whole thousand-million-fold world as offerings.

In 1287 Zhongfeng Mingben received tonsure at Shiziyuan Monastery on Tianmu Mountain. In 1288 he was ordained as a monk. Contrary to the norm, he grew long hair in (presumed) accordance with his teacher, Gaofeng Yuanmai.

As a young man he was appointed to succeed the abbot of the monastery on Tianmu Mountain, but fled the monastery in a search for solitude.

As an adult he had an "overpowering physical build". He was called "The old Buddha south of the sea", an allusion to Mazu Daoyi, (709–788) one of the most influential teachers of Chan Buddhism, who lived during the Tang dynasty (618–907), the "golden age of Zen". Zhongfeng Mingben declined a number of titles, appointments and positions, temporarily choosing instead a life of wandering and solitary meditation. He turned down an invitation of Ayurbarwada Buyantu Khan to come to the Yuan court.

== Teachings ==
=== Illusion ===
In Zhongfeng Mingben's Huanzhu Jiaxun, "Family instructions of Illusory Abiding", he describes himself as "the illusionary man", alluding to the play of Maya and the ability of tricksters to create an illusionary world. Zhongfeng Mingben states that this world is illusory, but that there is no alternative to this illusion. Students have to realize the pervasiveness of this illusion, and learn to act within it. The alternative for this illusionary or relative world, the absolute truth, is not to be regarded as an enduring phenomenon.

Zhongfeng Mingben relies on the Sutra of Perfect Enlightenment in his teachings on how to overcome this illusion. This sutra gives metaphors connected to illusion to explain the insubstantial nature of ignorance, such as dreams or flowers in the sky. (Note: "Flowers in the sky" is translated in Japanese as "Kuge" (ch. 19; "Shobogenzo"). Sky stands for "empty" thus "Flowers in the empty". This corresponds to the principle of the insubstantiality (one of the three seals of Buddhism) thus that everything exists and nothing is real, in the sense that nothing has its own fixed reality, fixed measure, fixed form, nothing that is alive, has its own nature or independent, autonomous substantiality. (Note: Cultural association "Flowers in the Sky")) (Note: The Sutra of Perfect Enlightenment says: "What is ignorance? Good sons, all sentient beings fall into various inverted views without beginning. Just like a disoriented person who confuses the four directions, they mistakenly take the Four Elements as the attributes of their bodies and the conditioned shadows of the Six Objects as the attributes of their mind. It is just like when our eyes are diseased and we see flowers in the sky, or a second moon. Good sons, the sky actually has no flowers—they are the false attachment of the diseased person. And because of this false attachment, not only are we confused about the self-nature of the sky; we are also mixed up about the place where real flowers come from. From this, there is the falsely existent transmigration through life and death. Therefore it is called "ignorance." (Note: The Sutra of Perfect Enlightenment (Yuanjue jing), translated by Charles Muller Archived October 15, 2014, at the Wayback Machine)) Illusory phenomena emerge from an intrinsically pure ground. (Note: The Buddha nature, or the Aālayavijñāna) Since the illusions are not real in themselves, their disappearance will not change this pure ground. But the disappearance itself is also illusionary since the mind is enlightened or pure from the beginning. This makes it impossible to speak of either being enlightened or unenlightened, a position which is clearly at odds with basic Buddhist teachings. This is "cured" by overcoming "the discriminating thought processes that posit terms like illusion and real".

=== Physical practice ===
Illusion is also created by relying on words. There are alternative, non-discursive ways of relating to words, one of them being k'an-hua, "observing the key phrase", the method of kōan study introduced by Dahui Zonggao (1089–1163). Insight must be based in bodily experience rather than mere intellectual discrimination.

Another physical practice is calligraphy, the writing of characters. This writing is a bodily act. The writing of a character is not an intellectual inquiry, but "a performance of it". Zhongfeng Mingben was a celebrated calligraphy artist.

=== Pure Land ===
Zhongfeng Mingben merged Chan with Pure Land teachings. Together with Yongming Yanshou (904–975), who lived three centuries earlier, he was an influential proponent of this dual practice.

== Influence ==
=== Monastic discipline ===
Zhongfeng Mingben lived after the "golden age of Chan" of the Tang and the proliferation of Chan during the Tang. His age was regarded as an age of mofa ("Degenerate age of the Law"). Zhongfeng Mingben attributed this to a lack of monastic discipline and a lack of personal dedication by monks, and tried to counter this by writing a monastic code, the Huan-chu ch'ing-kuei (Jpn. Genju shingi), in 1317. This work influenced Musō Soseki, a contemporary of Zhongfeng Mingben, when he wrote his guidelines for monasteries and monks, the Rinsen kakun.

=== Gong-an ===
Zhongfeng Mingben was the first to compare the sayings and teachings of the 'masters of the old' with the public cases of the court, the gong-an.

According to Zhongfeng Mingben gōng'àn abbreviates gōngfǔ zhī àndú (公府之案牘, Japanese kōfu no antoku – literally the andu "official correspondence; documents; files" of a gongfu "government post"), which referred to a "public record" or the "case records of a public law court" in Tang-dynasty China. (Note: Assertions that the literal meaning of kung-an is the table, desk, or bench of a magistrate appear on page 18 of Foulk 2000. See also) Kōan/gong'an thus serves as a metaphor for principles of reality beyond the private or subjective opinion of one person and a teacher may test the student's ability to recognize and understand that principle.

=== Japanese Zen ===
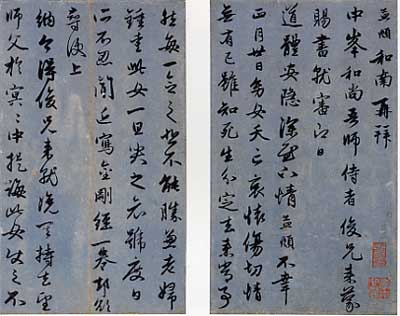
Epistle to Zhongfeng Mingben (与中峰明本尺牘, yochūhō myōhon sekitoku) One of six letters, ink on paper; Seikadō Bunko Art Museum, Tokyo

Several Japanese Buddhists came to China to study with Zhongfeng Mingben on Mount T'ien-mu. They formed the Genjū line of the Rinka monasteries, the more independent monasteries outside the cities and the Five Mountain System of government-approved temples. Kosen Ingen was the most important of these Japanese students. (Note: (1295–1374) Founding priest of Hōkizan Chōju-ji temple, Kenchoji School, Rinzai) Other students include Kohō Kakumyō, a teacher of Bassui Tokushō, and Jakushitsu Genkō (1290–1367), the founder of Eigen-ji.

Although they never met, Zhongfeng Mingben had a close affinity with Musō Soseki, via the Japanese students who studied with him.

=== Wild fox slobber ===
Hakuin's warning against "wild fox slobber" can be traced back to Zhongfeng Mingben. The term "wild fox" points to teachers who lead students astray by giving wrong information. The term wild fox is also the name of the Wild fox koan. Whereas Zhongfeng Mingben warns against the impossible attempt of totally silencing the mind, Hakuin uses the term in a more positive sense, to denote the workings of koans, which "possess the power to cause sudden death in students, raising the great doubt in their minds that will lead them to the 'great death' and the rebirth of satori and enlightenment".

== Criticism ==
Zhongfeng Mingben's teachings mark the beginning of a development in Chinese Chan which made it vulnerable in the competition with other teachings:

[T]he tradition came to be increasingly anti-intellectual in orientation and, in the process, reduced its complex heritage to simple formulae for which literal interpretations were thought to be adequate.

This development left Chinese Chan vulnerable for criticisms by neo-Confucianism, which developed after the Song dynasty. Its anti-intellectual rhetoric was no match for the intellectual discourse of the neo-Confucianists.

== Works ==
- Huanzhu Jiaxun, "The family instructions of "Illusory Abiding".
- Zhongfeng huai Qingtu shi, "Poem of Zhongfeng's love for the Pure Land".
- Admonition on filiality.
- Sanshi xinian, "Apprehending the thought [of Amithaba Buddha] within the Three Divisions of the Day".

- T'ien-mu Chung-feng Ho-shang Kuang-lu, "The Comprehensive Record of Chung-feng"; includes his writings and recorded sayings (goroku) compiled by Po-T'ing T'zu-chi for the last Yuan emperor, Shun-ti and presented in 1334.

== Sources ==
- Chen, Pi-Yen (2010), Fanbai. Chinese Buddhist Monastic Chants, A-R Editions, Inc., ISBN 9780895796721
- Baroni, Helen J. (2002), The Illustrated Encyclopedia of Zen Buddhism, Rosen Publishing Group, ISBN 0823922405
- de Bary, Theodore; Bloom, Irene (2000), Sources of Chinese Tradition, Volume 1, Columbia University Press, ISBN 9780231109390
- Dumoulin, Heinrich (2005a), Zen Buddhism: A History. Volume 1: India and China, World Wisdom Books, ISBN 9780941532891
- Dumoulin, Heinrich (2005b), Zen Buddhism: A History. Volume 2: Japan, World Wisdom Books, ISBN 9780941532907
- Foulk, T. Griffith (2000), "The form and function of kōan literature. A historical overview", in Steven Heine; Dale S. Wright (eds.), The Kōan. Texts and contexts in Zen Buddhism, Oxford University Press, ISBN 0195117492
- Hakuin (2009), Hakuin's Precious Mirror Cave: A Zen Miscellany, Counterpoint Press, ISBN 9781582434759
- Heller, Natasha (December 2009a), "The Chan Master as Illusionist: Zhongfeng Mingben's Huanzhu Jiaxun" (PDF), Harvard Journal of Asiatic Studies, 69 (2): 271–308, doi:10.1353/jas.0.0020, S2CID 170819511
- Lauer, Uta (2002), A Master of His Own: The Calligraphy of the Chan Abbot Zhongfeng Mingben (1262–1323), Franz Steiner Verlag, ISBN 9783515079327
- McCausland, Shane (2011), Zhao Mengfu: Calligraphy and Painting for Khubilai's China, Hong Kong University Press
- McRae, John (2003), Seeing Through Zen. Encounter, Transformation, and Genealogy in Chinese Chan Buddhism, The University Press Group Ltd, ISBN 9780520237988
- Patry Leidy, Denise (2009), The Art of Buddhism: An Introduction to Its History and Meaning, Shambhala Publications, ISBN 9781590306703
- Payne, Richard Karl; Tanaka, Kenneth Kazuo (2004), Approaching the Land of Bliss: Religious Praxis in the Cult of Amitābha, University of Hawaii Press, ISBN 9780824825782
- Sasaki, Ruth Fuller (1965), "Introduction", in Isshu Miura; Ruth Fuller Sasaki (eds.), The Zen Kōan, Harvest/HBJ
- Wright, Dale S. (2000), "Koan History. Transformative Language in Chinese Buddhist Thought", in Steven Heine; Dale S. Wright (eds.), The Koan. Texts and Contexts in Zen Buddhism, Oxford: Oxford University Press, ISBN 0195117492
