= Dragon; Tiger =

Zen (Chan) Painting of Dragon and Tiger by Muqi

- Chinese: 龍虎圖
- Artist: Muqi
- Year: 1250-1279
- Medium: hanging scroll
- Dimensions: 125.2 cm × 57.2 cm (49 5/16 in × 22 1/2 in)
- Location: Cleveland Museum of Art, Cleveland
- Accession: 1958.427
- Website: https://www.clevelandart.org/art/1958.427

Dragon, Tiger (Chinese: 龍虎圖) are a set of two hanging scroll paintings on silk, painted by the Chan (Zen) artist Muqi Fachang during the Southern Song dynasty, contemporary to that of the Kamakura period. Now housed at the Cleveland Museum of Art, the painting was exported from China to Japan soon after its creation, where it enjoyed long time ownership under the Ashikaga shogunate.

Like the painting Six Persimmons, held by Daitoku-ji, Kyoto, Muqi's paintings has long been considered popular in Japan.

== Description ==
The dragon and tiger are a common motif in Chinese art, both representing yin and yang, polar yet complementary energies. The paintings utilize the dynamic by having the dragon in a darker background, head emerging out. Meanwhile, the tiger is done on a lighter background, taking up a good portion of the scrolls, licking its paw, tail curled.

Currently displayed as a diptych, the original painting would be a triptych when on display in the temple, like an image of Kannon.

The silk has faded along with the red ink, which would have been applied on the tiger's nose and tongue.

== Provenance ==
Muqi is well received in Japan, but contemporary at the time, his reception was mixed in China.

His ink play works are coarse and vulgar and do not follow the ancient rules - Tang Hou, Huajian (1328)

Additional contemporary reviews included a piece by Xia Wenyan.

He likes to paint dragons and tigers, monkeys and cranes, reeds and geese, landscapes, trees and rocks, as well as figures. All of his works are done with sketchy strokes and dots of ink. His conceptions are simple, and he doesn't decorate - Tuhui baojian (1365)

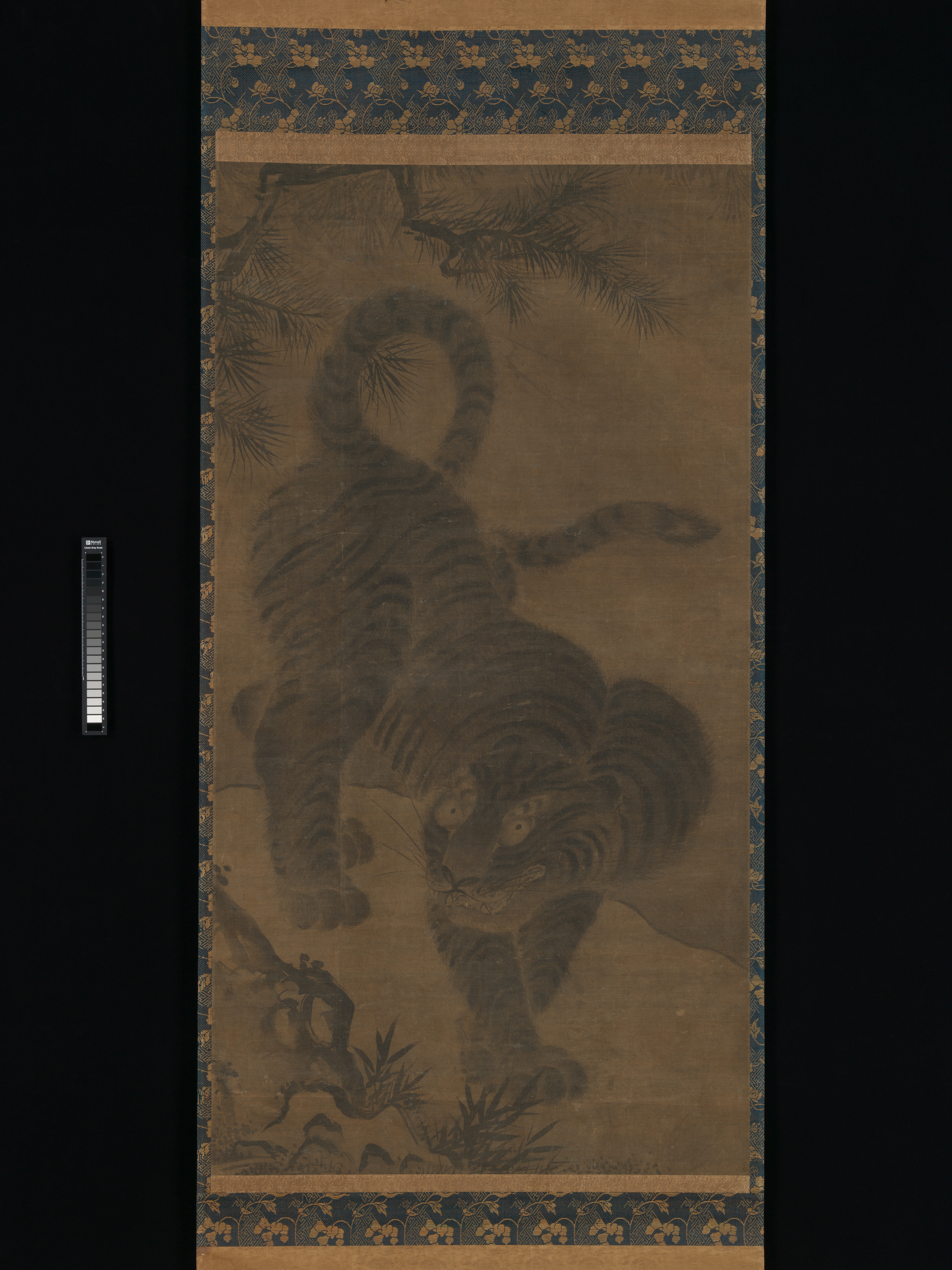
Tiger, in the style of Muqi (MET Museum 12.123.1)

Art critics of the Yuan dynasty, such as Xia Wenyuan, Wu Taisu, Zhaung Su, do note Muqi's tendencies towards the "dragon and tiger" motif.

Dragon; Tiger would end up being exported to Japan soon after its creation. The earliest datable ownership derives from the seal inscription: 道有 (Japanese: Dōyū), indicating ownership by the shogun Ashikaga Yoshimitsu (1358-1408).

Additional owners who imprinted their seals on the painting include Ashikaga Yoshinori and Tokugawa Iemitsu. In the 19th century, the painting went under the ownership of the Sakai clan from the late Edo period to early Meiji era. Subsequently arriving in the United States, whereupon on 20 July 1959, the painting was acquired by Monuments Men and former Far Eastern and Near Eastern art curator Howard C. Hollis, who established his own art dealership in 1949.

== Legacy ==
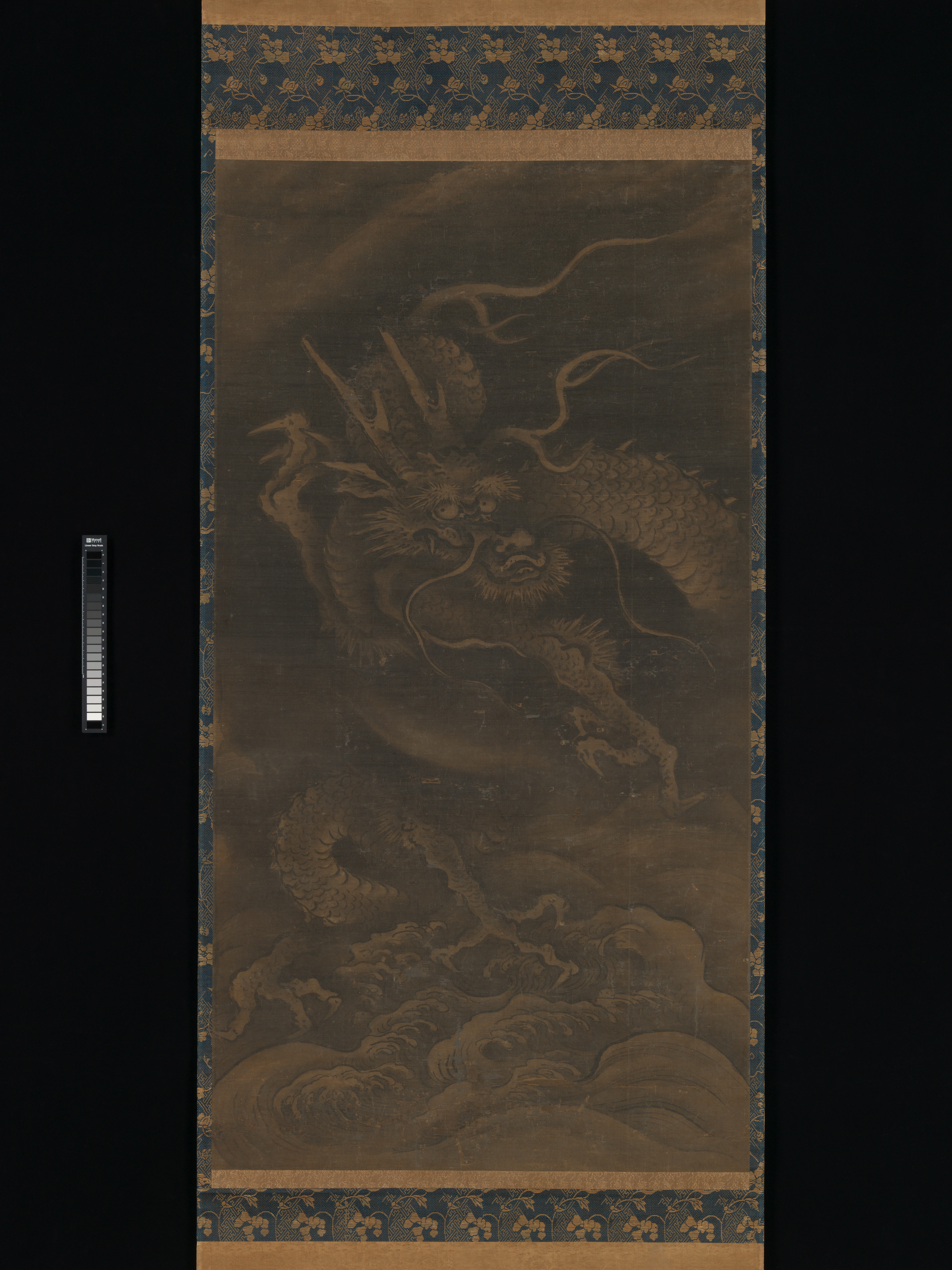
Dragon, in the style of Muqi (MET 12.123.2)

The movement that Muqi would be a part of, Zenga, would have a major influence in Japanese art over the course of centuries, reflecting on works from subsequent artists, such as Sesson Shukei, Nagasawa Rosetsu, and so on.

Another painting initially attributed to Muqi, acquired by the Metropolitan Museum of Art in 1912 (12.123.1 and 12.123.2), though later determined not to be of his hand (dated tot the 16th-17th centuries), may be of Japanese or Korean origin, and also indicative of the sphere of influence that he is a part of.
