= Baisan Monpon =

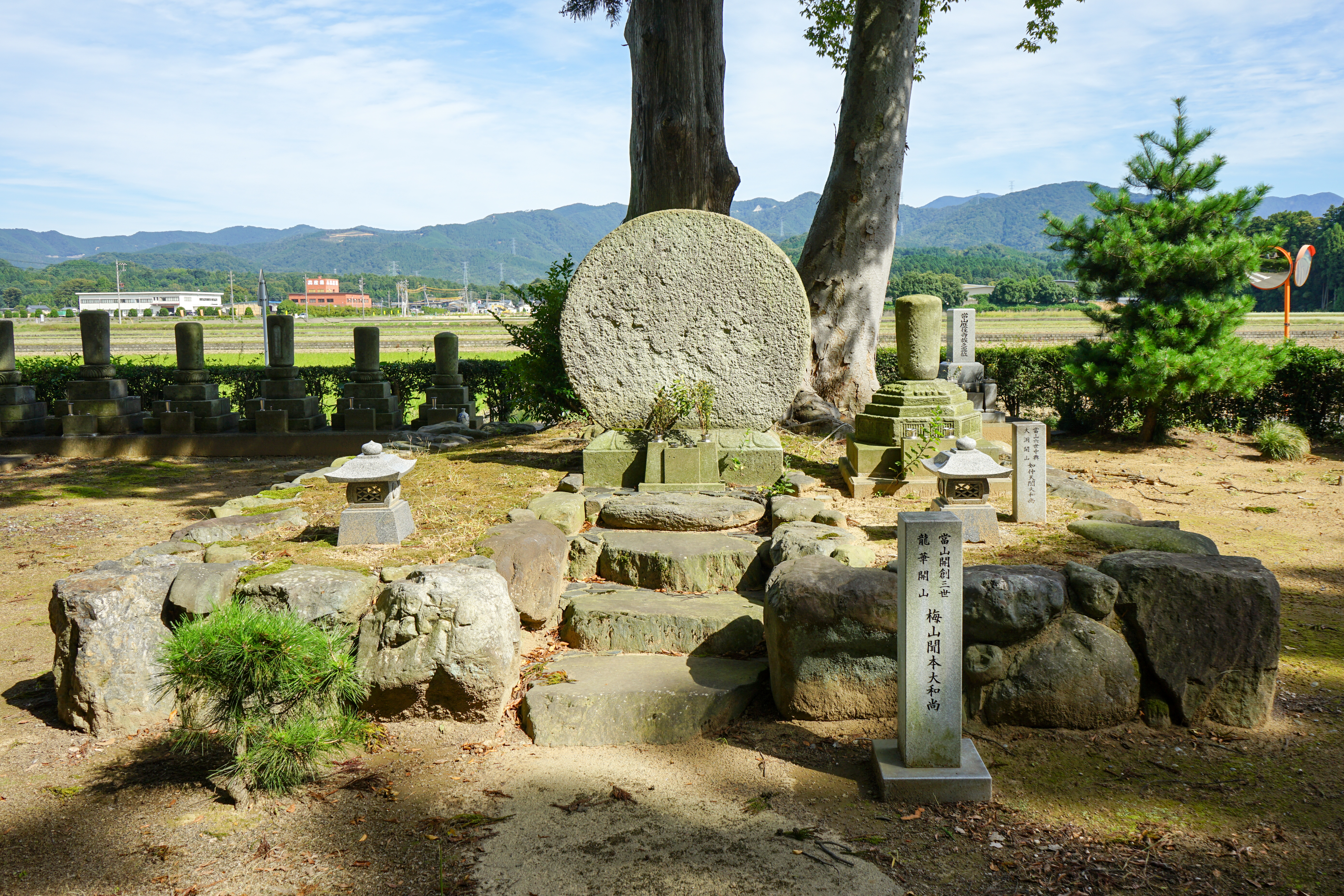
Tomb of Baisan Monpon (Awara-shi, Fukui Prefecture, Japan)

Baisan Monpon (梅山聞本, died 1417) was a Sōtō Zen monk. He received dharma transmission from Gasan Jōseki and is considered a patriarch by the Sōtō school. He authored the Zenkai-ron (Treatise on Zen Precepts).

His disciple Jochū Tengin (如仲天誾), who founded Akiba Souhonden Kasuisai in 1394, is considered his successor in the line of patriarchs. His other disciples included Taisho (太初継覚) and Ketsudo Nosho (傑堂能勝), who founded Kōun-ji Temple in 1394.
