= Jochū Tengin =

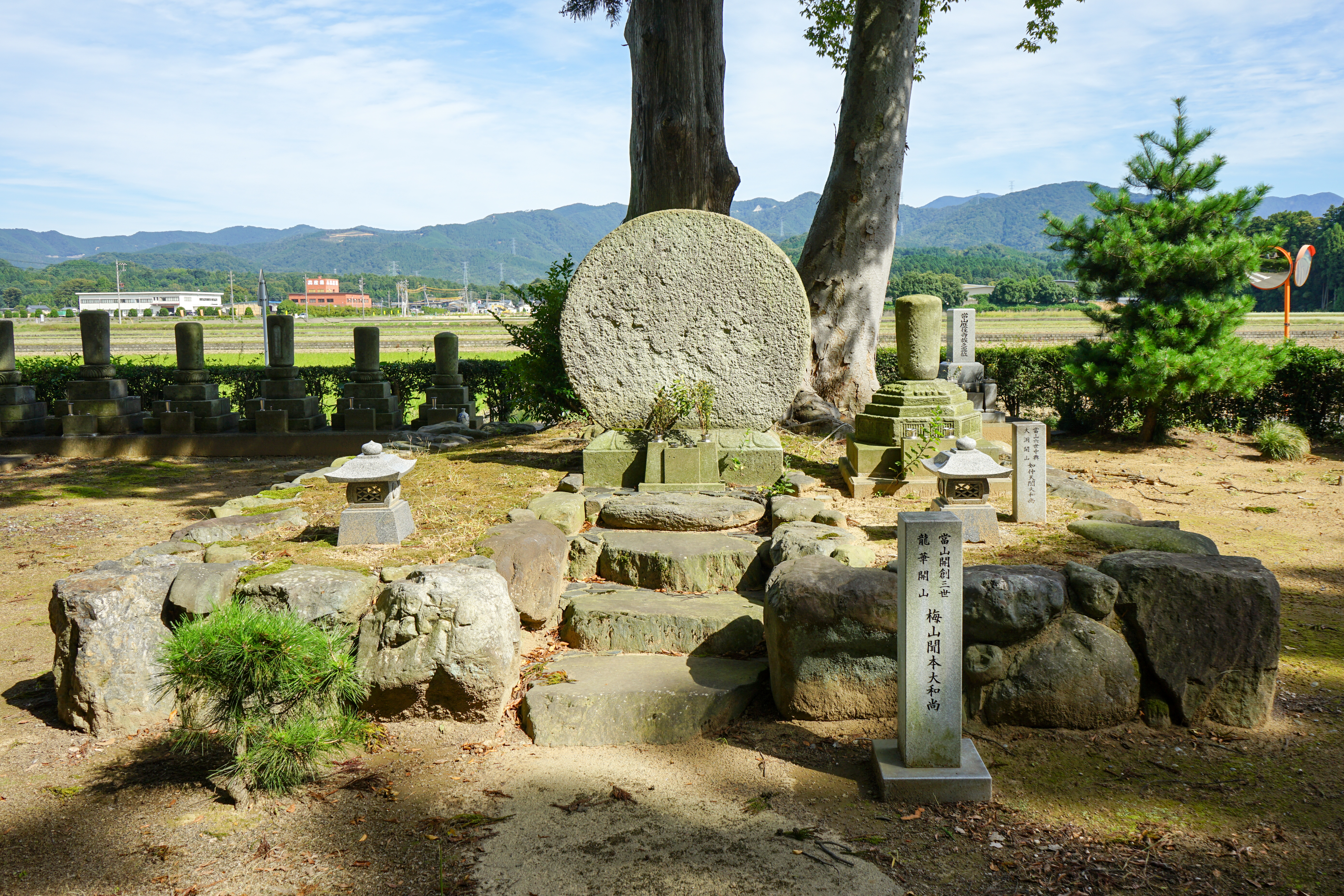
Tombs of Jochū Tengin and Baisan Monpon (Awara-shi, Fukui Prefecture, Japan)

Jochū Tengin (如仲天誾, also 恕仲天誾; 1363-1437) was a Sōtō Zen monk. He received dharma transmission from Baisan Monpon and is considered a patriarch by the Sōtō school.

By the time of Jochū, the institution and organization of the Keizan line of Sōtō Zen was complete. His disciples, Kisan Shōsan and Shingan Dōkū, started separate dharma lineages that are honored in different temples within the school.
