= Sōji-ji =

Head temples of the Sōtō school of Zen Buddhism

Sōji-ji 總持寺
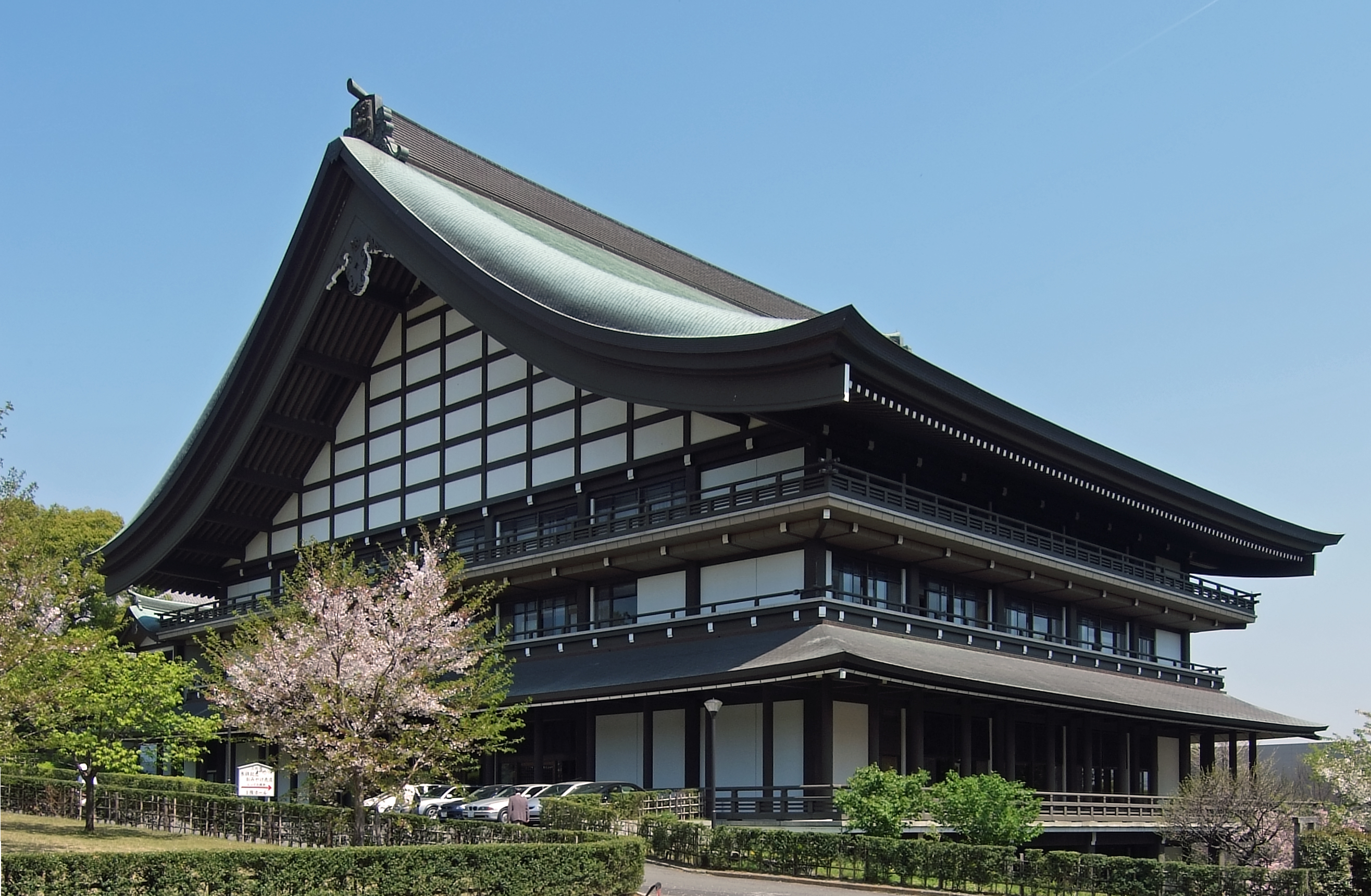
- Sanshōkaku (三松閣), visitors' center

Religion
- Affiliation: Sōji-ji Sōtō
- Deity: Shaka Nyorai (Śākyamuni)
- Status: Head Temple

Location
- Location: 2-Chōme 1-1 Tsurumi, Tsurumi-ku, Yokohama, Kanagawa Prefecture
- Country: Japan
- Interactive map of Sōji-ji 總持寺
- Coordinates: 35°30′25.16″N 139°40′17.25″E

Architecture
- Founder: Gyōki (acc. legend); Keizan (conversion)
- Completed: Nara period (acc. legend); 1911 (relocation)

Website
- http://sojiji.jp/

Sōji-ji (總持寺) is one of two daihonzan (大本山; "head temples") of the Sōtō school of Zen Buddhism. The other is Eihei-ji temple in Fukui Prefecture. Fodor's calls it "one of the largest and busiest Buddhist institutions in Japan". The temple was founded in 740 as a Shingon Buddhist temple. Keizan, later known as Sōtō's great patriarch Taiso Jōsai Daishi, founded the present temple in 1321, when he renamed it Sōji-ji with the help and patronage of Emperor Go-Daigo. The temple has about twelve buildings in Tsurumi, part of the port city of Yokohama, one designed by the architect Itō Chūta.

== History ==
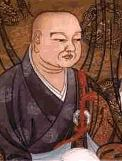
Keizan, the temple's founder

Giving it the name Morooka-dera (諸岳寺) circa 740, Gyōki (668–749) founded the temple as a Shingon Buddhist temple in Noto, a peninsula on Honshu, Japan's largest island. At that time, the temple was a small chapel within the precincts of a larger Shinto shrine called Morooka Hiko Jinja. By 1296, the temple had grown enough to support a full-time priest and a master ajari named Jōken was assigned there.

The Shrine was relocated 1321 to a new estate and Jōken went with it. Jōken entrusted the former temple to Keizan, who then changed the temple from Shingon to a Sōtō temple named Shogakuzan Sōji-ji (ji means Buddhist temple in Japanese). The first official abbot, Gasan, was installed months later. However, the original Buddhist deity enshrined, Kannon Bodhisattva, was still enshrined in the temple, and for a time esoteric rituals were still carried out for the temple's patrons. Because Keizan had originally previously founded another temple, Yōkōji, a complicated rivalry existed between the two temples, leading to open conflict during the Tokugawa period, with Sōji-ji gradually replacing Yōkōji as the head temple of Keizan and the lineage of Gikai. This ascension of Sōji-ji happened in part due to its efforts to send monks out into the countryside, and over generations these monks would often convert small, village chapels (nominally Tendai or Shingon) into full-time temples, which in turn helped Sōji-ji's network grow.

The temple was totally destroyed by fire in 1898. It was rebuilt over a period of several years and, to bring more Sōtō Zen to eastern Japan, reopened in 1911 in its present location at Tsurumi, Yokohama. Sōji-ji-soin (the "father" temple) was built on the original Noto site for monks in training. It sustained considerable damage in the 2007 Noto earthquake.

== Routine ==
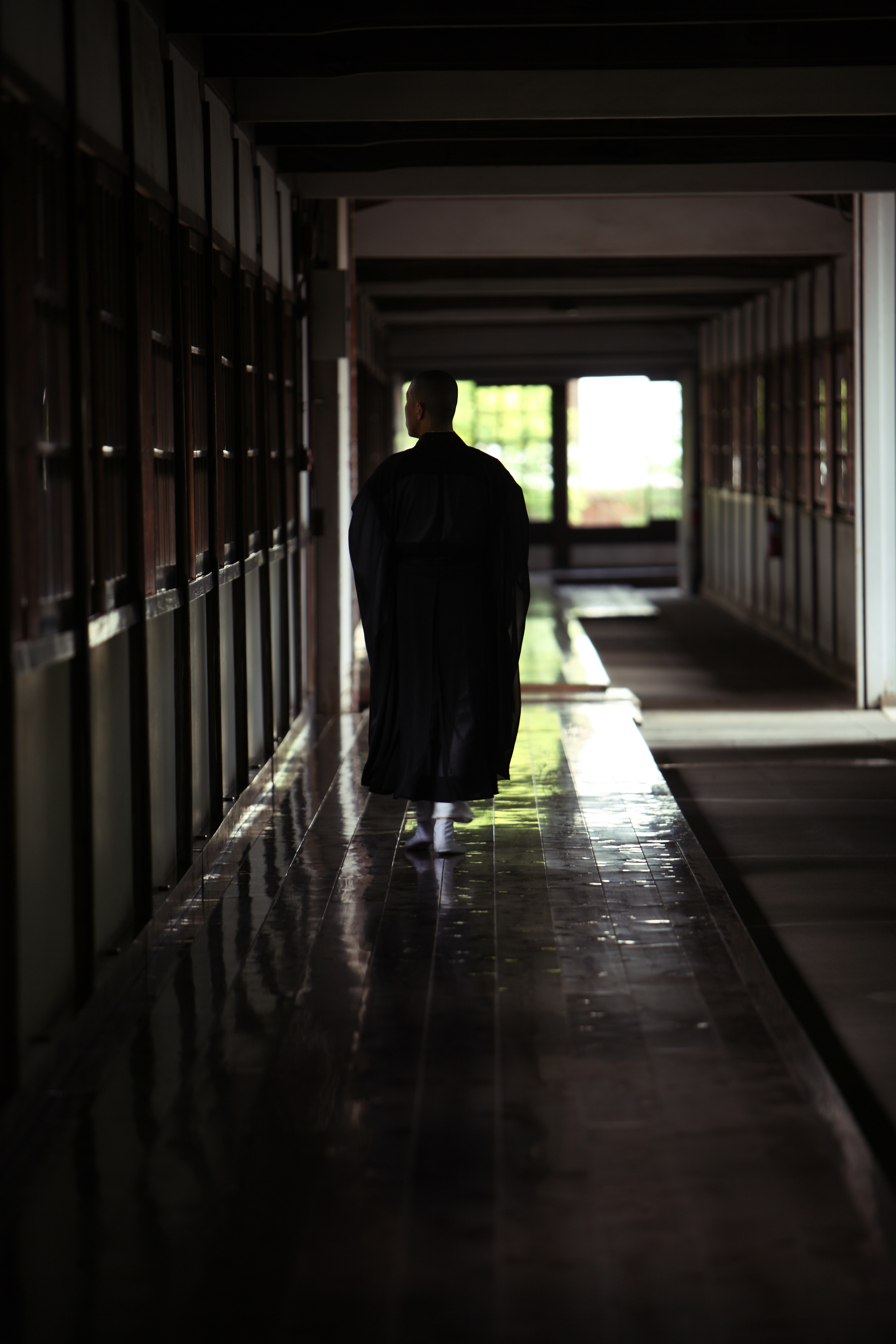
Monk in the corridor which is polished like glass twice a day

According to a mid-20th century description, the monks' day begins at 3 a.m. in summer and one hour later in winter. First they practice zazen for two hours, then attend a service and sutra reading for 75 minutes. They later eat breakfast (rice gruel, tea and pickles). Then for 90 minutes they clean the buildings and the grounds. At 8 a.m. they study Chinese poetry and the writings of Zenjis like Dōgen and Keizan. At 11 a.m. they go to the Butsuden where they perform services or read sūtras for visitors. They eat rice and vegetables for lunch and then from 1 to 3 p.m. they return to perform services for visitors. They eat rice gruel for dinner at 5 p.m. From 6 to 8 p.m. the head monk teaches them sutra reading, from 8 p.m. to 9 p.m. they return to practice zazen, and then go to sleep at 9 p.m.

== Abbot ==
The Abbot is called Zenji (English: Master of Zen), and oversees 200 monks and novices in residence. Egawa Shinzan Zenji holds the positions of Abbot of Sōji-ji Soin Training Monastery, administrator of Sōji-ji and Soji-ji Soin, and vice rector, resident priest, assistant head priest, and head priest of related organizations.

== Temple compound ==
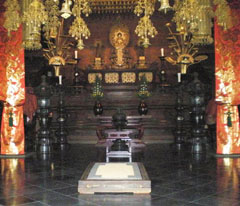
Butsuden

The core of the temple consists of seven structures forming the so-called Shichidō garan. The sanmon gate, built in 1969, is, according to the temple's pamphlet the largest such structure in Japan. Itō Chūta (1867–1954) designed the Daiso-dō or Hattō, which honors Keizan and other founders, and the Senbutsujo, the hall used as the monks' main training center and to ordain monks. The Sanshōkaku, constructed in 1990 and equipped with computers and other modern amenities, is a visitors' center for practice and workshops for lay persons aimed at fulfilling Keizan Zenji's vow to help all sentient beings. The Butsuden (Buddha Hall) enshrines a statue of Gautama Buddha (Shaka Nyorai). The Shōkurō contains the [[:ja:梵鐘|bonshō]] bell, the drum, the cloud gong or umpan, and the wooden drum (moppan), used to signal the monks' daily routine. The Hōkō-dō is used for memorial rites to ancestors of lay persons, for whom the monks perform services.

Among outreach activities, the Sōji Gakuen Academy is a school system where the students study the Buddha's teaching. The academy has a kindergarten, middle school, high school, and university. Sōji also has child care and a hospital.

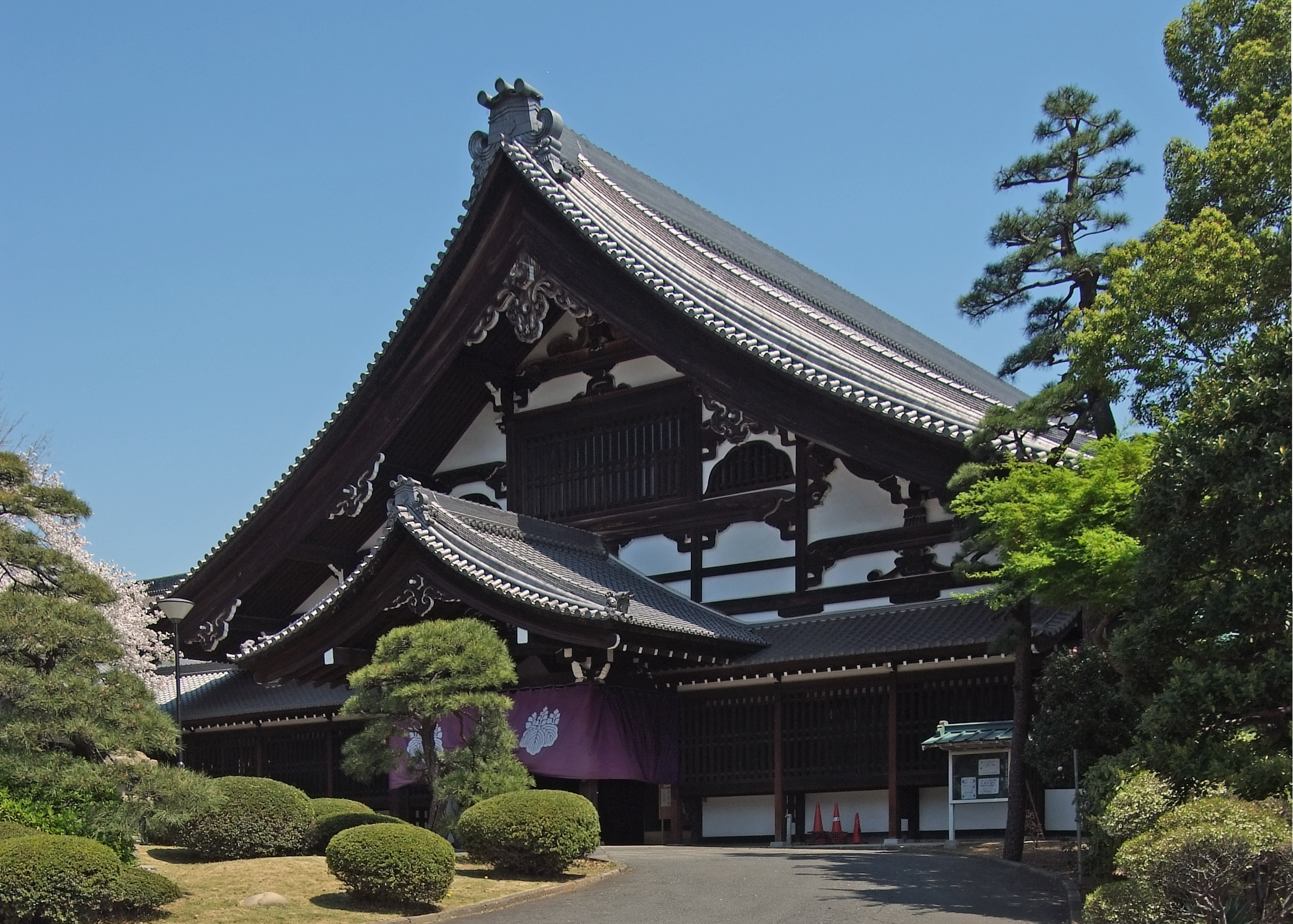
The Koshakudai building contains the kitchen.

The Koshakudai holds the monks' living quarters.

== Notable burials ==
Sōji-ji is the final resting place of several prominent Japanese figures, including Asano Sōichirō (businessman), Kiyoura Keigo (former prime minister), Antonio Inoki (wrestler), Kuroiwa Shūroku (journalist, novelist, and translator), Toshiro Mayuzumi (composer), and Toshiko Sekiya (singer and composer).

== School ==
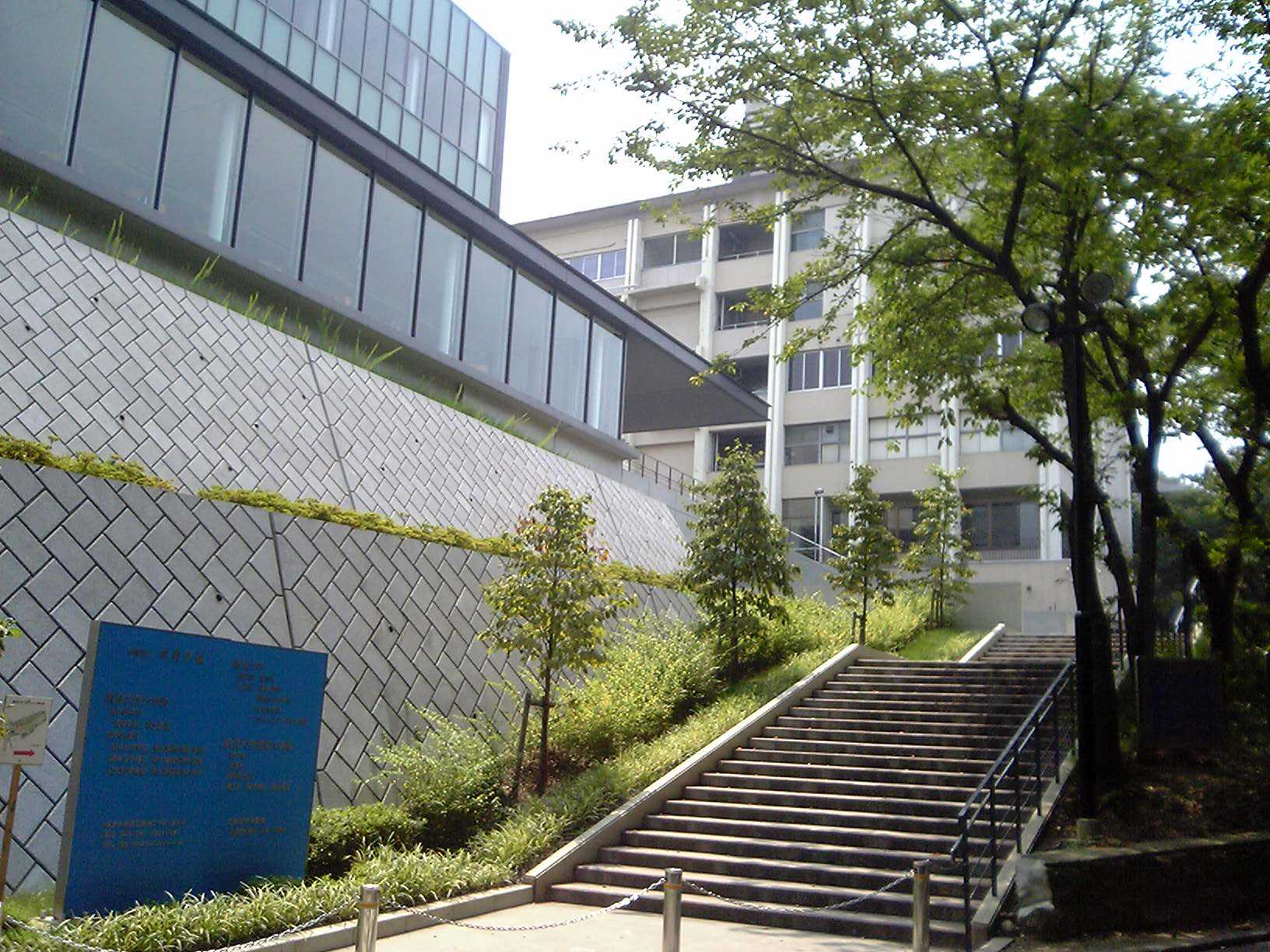
Tsurumi University

- Tsurumi University

=== Affiliates ===
- Komazawa University
- Tohoku Fukushi University
- Aichi Gakuin University
- Tsurumi University
- Komazawa Women's University
- Tomakomai Komazawa University
- Komazawa Junior College
- Komazawa Senior High School
- Komazawa Iwamizawa Senior High School
- Komazawa Tomakomai Senior High School

== Branches ==
- Sōjiji-soin (総持寺祖院) in Ishikawa Prefecture
- Hōgen-ji (法源寺), also known as the Sōjiji Hokkaidō Betsuin (総持寺北海道別院), in Matsumae

=== In the United States ===
- Zenshuji Soto Mission

== See also ==
- Eihei-ji

== Gallery ==
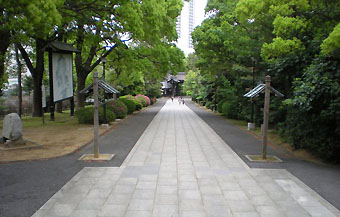
The entrance

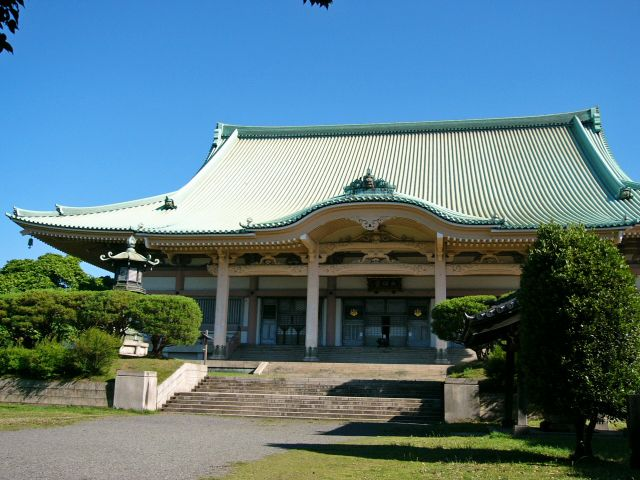
Daisō-dō or Hattō, the main training center, designed by Itō Chūta

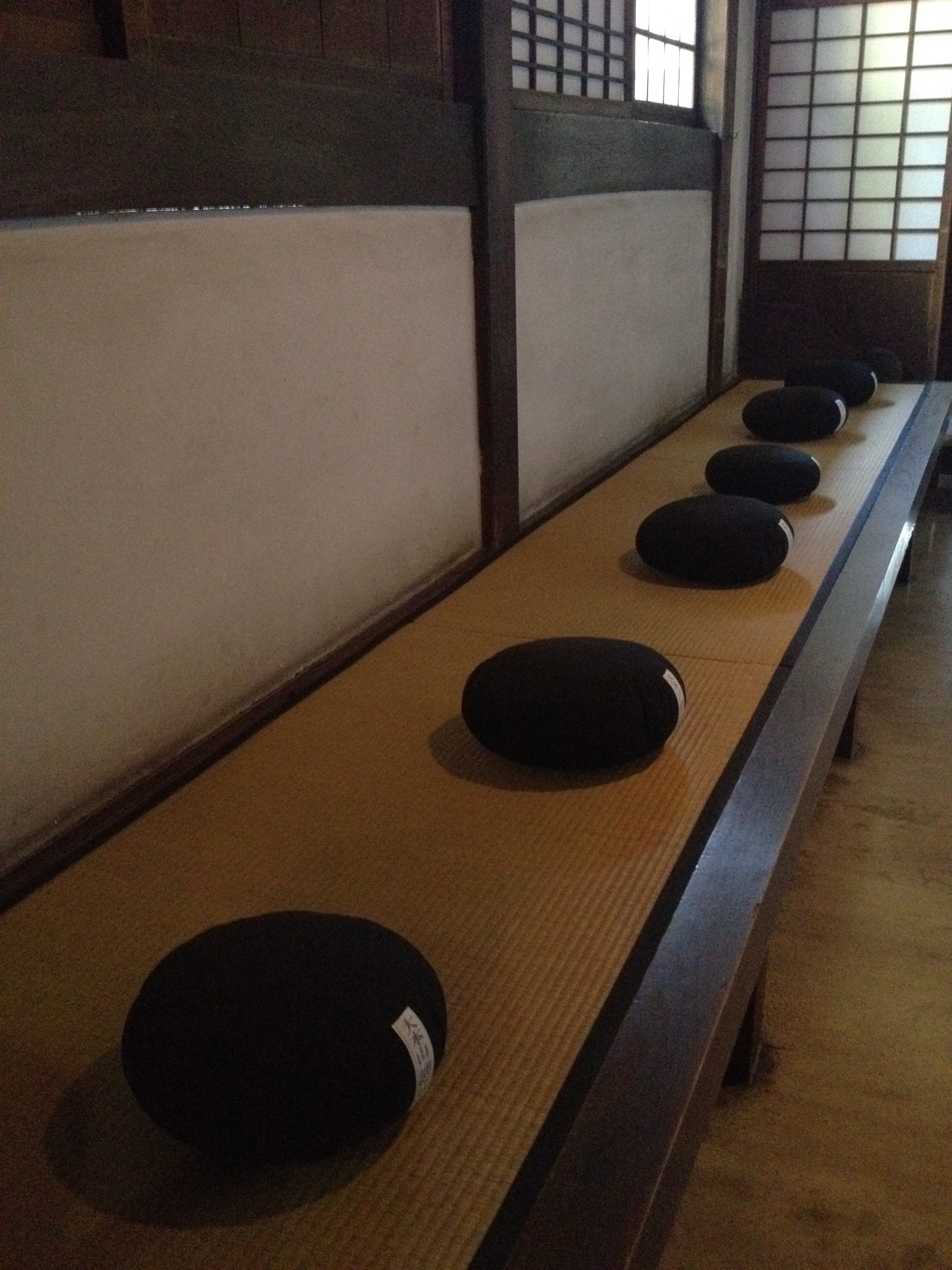
On a raised platform some of the monks' zafu, used for zazen

Sunrise 2007

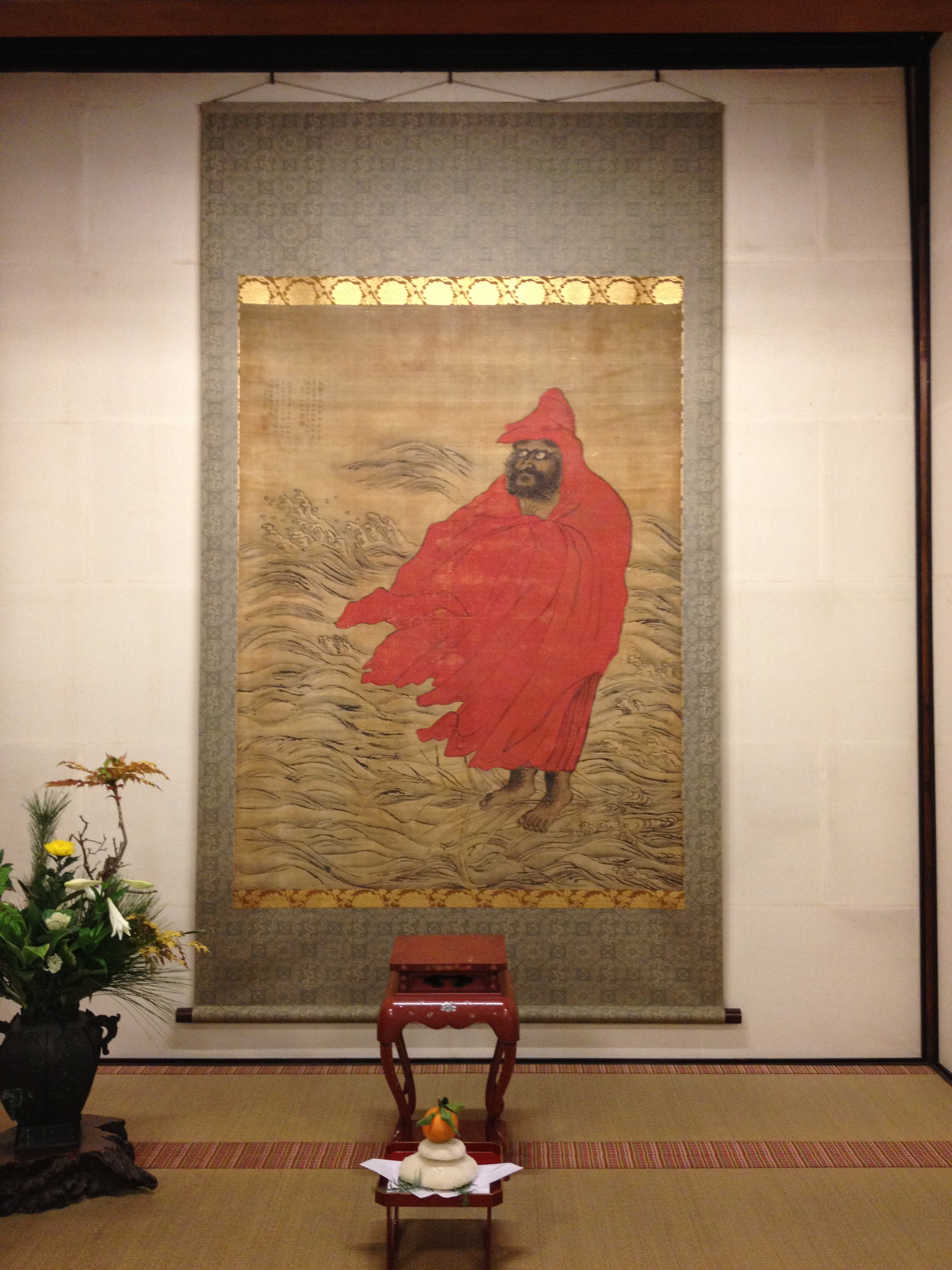
A painting of Bodhidharma in the reception hall

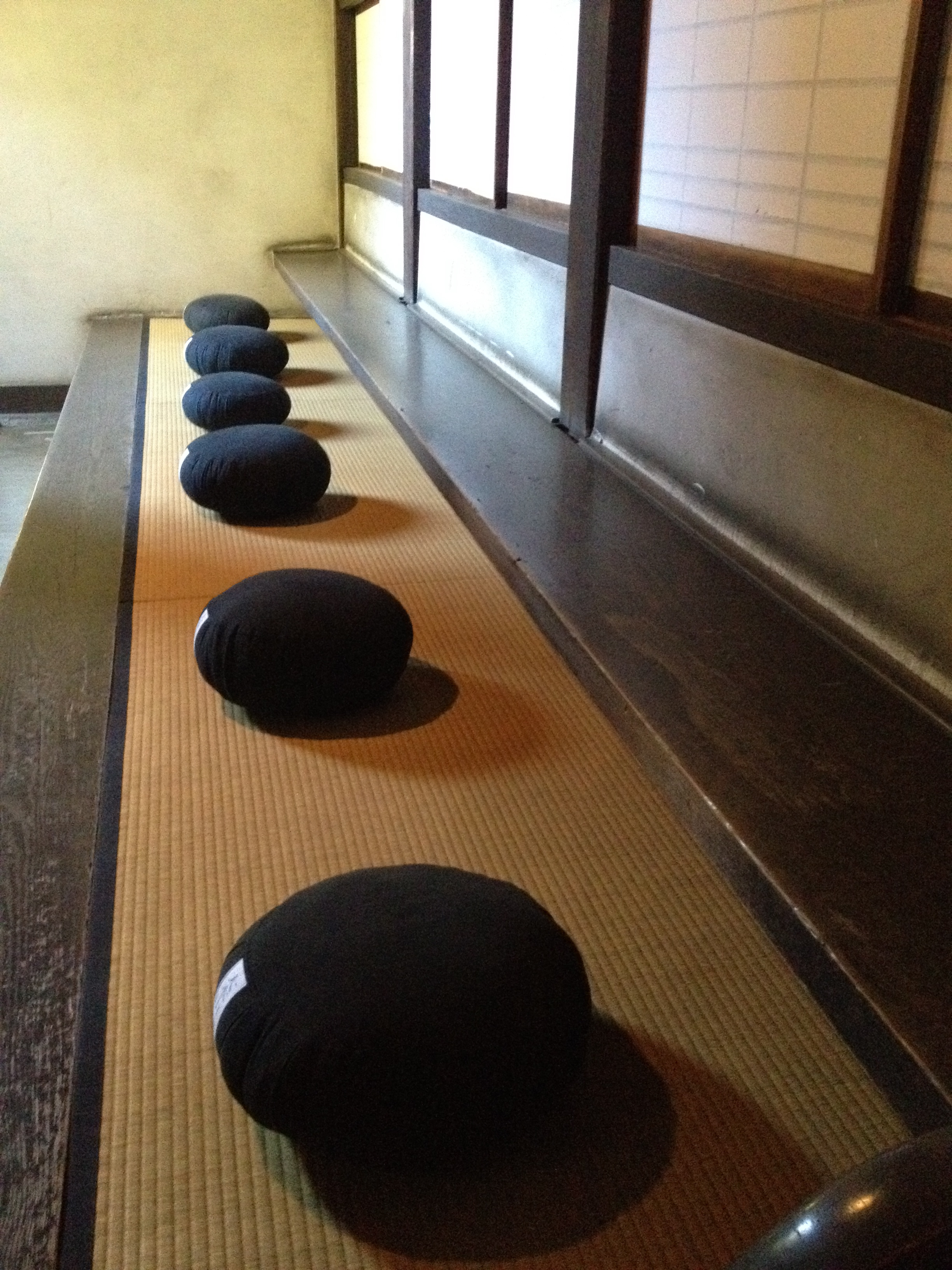
The meditation hall, or shuryō (衆寮)
