= Taigen Sōshin =

Sõtō Zen monk

Taigen Sōshin (太源宗真, died 1370) was a Sōtō Zen monk. He received dharma transmission from Gasan Jōseki and is considered a patriarch by the Sōtō school.

Buddhist titles
Preceded by Gasan Jōseki	Sōtō Zen patriarch 1366–1370	Succeeded by Baisan Monpon
