= Keizan =

Japanese Zen master

Keizan Jōkin Zenji
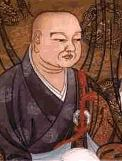
- Title: Zen Master; Daishi

Personal life
- Born: Keizan Jōkin; 1268 Japan
- Died: 1325 (aged 56–57) Japan
- Other name: Taiso Jōsai Daishi

Religious life
- Religion: Zen Buddhism
- School: Sōtō

Senior posting
- Predecessor: Tettsū Gikai
- Successor: Meihō Sotetsu
- Students: Meihō Sotetsu Gasan Jōseki Mugai Chikō Koan Shinkan Kohō Kakumyō Genshō Chinzan Genka Tekkyō Daichi Sokei

Keizan Jōkin (Japanese: 瑩山紹瑾, 1268–1325), also known as Taiso Jōsai Daishi, is considered to be the second great founder of the Sōtō school of Zen in Japan. While Dōgen, as founder of Japanese Sōtō, is known as Highest Ancestor (高祖, kōso), Keizan is often referred to as Great Ancestor (太祖, taiso).

Keizan and his disciples are credited with beginning the spread of Sōtō Zen throughout Japan, away from the cloistered monastic practice characteristic of Dōgen's Eihei-ji and towards a more popular religion that appealed to all levels of Japanese society. Keizan founded several temples during his lifetime, most notably Yōkō-ji and Daihonzan Sōji-ji (founded on the Noto Peninsula and moved to Tsurumi-ku, Yokohama in 1911). Today Sōji-ji and Eihei-ji stand together as the two principal Sōtō Zen training centers in Japan.

Keizan is also the author of several important Zen works, including the Zazen Yōjinki (Admonitions for Zazen), the Denkōroku (Transmission of the Light), and Keizan’s Rules of Purity (Keizan shingi).

== Biography ==
=== Youth and Zen-training ===
Keizan spent the first eight years growing up under the care of his grandmother, Myōchi (明智), who was one of Great Master Dōgen's first supporters on his return from China. Keizan dedicated the Kannon shrine at the temple of Yōkō-ji to her memory.

His mother was the abbess of a Sōtō monastery, Jōju-ji (成就寺) and was a teacher in her own right. It seems that his mother had a huge influence on him, both as an example of someone who encouraged the teaching of Buddhism to women and through her emphasis on the power of Kannon, the bodhisattva of compassion.

Keizan first became a novice, at the age of eight, at Eihei-ji, under the tutelage of Gikai, and he was formally ordained at age thirteen by Koun Ejō. He reached the stage of "non-backsliding" while training with Jakuen, and received dharma transmission from Tettsū Gikai at the age of thirty-two, according to his autobiography; he was the first Japanese Zen monk to describe his own life.

=== Sōji-ji ===
Keizan succeeded Gikai as the second abbot of Daijō-ji, in present-day Kanazawa.

Keizan's major accomplishment, which gave rise to his status as "second ancestor" of Sōtō Zen, was the founding of Sōji-ji, which soon overshadowed Eihei-ji as the principal Sōtō temple. Sōji-ji eventually became the institutional head of four regional networks with several thousand temples under them. By 1589, the imperial court recognized Sōji-ji as the head temple of the Sōtō school, above Eihei-ji; the two temples remained rivals for imperial support. By the time of the Meiji Restoration in 1872, they had arrived at a truce, according to the characterization that the Sōtō school followed "the maxims of the founding Ancestor, Dōgen, and the aspirations of the late teacher, Keizan."

=== Death ===
Keizan died at Yōkō-ji on the twenty-ninth day of the ninth month of 1325, at the age of fifty-eight years. Meihō Sotetsu (1277–1350) became abbot of Yōkō-ji, and Gasan Jōseki abbot of Sōji-ji; both of those lines of Dharma Transmission remain important in Japanese Sōtō Zen. (Jiyu-Kennett 2002: 97)

== Work ==
Keizan was a learned scholar-monk in the Zen tradition, yet he perceived that Zen’s future could not depend solely on monastic scholars or aristocratic patrons. As such, he worked to promote Zen in a way that could penetrate the life of fishing villages, rural temples, family homes, and the lives of lay practitioners who sought a path that was viable in their lay life. In doing so, he reshaped the social reach of Sōtō Zen in ways that would have lasting impact.

One of Keizan’s most significant contributions was his integration of ritual and devotional practices into Sōtō Zen. Whereas Dōgen emphasized zazen, Keizan understood that a tradition becomes durable when it resonates with the emotional and spiritual needs of its communities. Under his leadership, ceremonies that included chanting, bowing, memorial services, ancestor veneration, and liturgical offerings became fully woven into the rhythm of Zen temple life. Much of what practitioners today recognize as the ceremonial dimension of Sōtō Zen can be traced to Keizan.

At the institutional level, Keizan also played a decisive role. His founding of Yōkōji and especially Sōjiji provided structural stability for the Sōtō Zen tradition, establishing training systems, forms, and schedules that continue in recognizable shape to this day. Through this work, Keizan transformed Sōtō Zen from a relatively small monastic movement into a broad tradition with the capacity to train, support, and transmit Zen across generations. Nearly all contemporary Sōtō priests trace their lineage through the line that flows from his leadership at Sōjiji.

=== Support for training women ===
Apart from extending the appeal of Sōtō Zen to the rural population, Keizan made efforts to encourage the training of women in Buddhism. Keizan, in his autobiography, gave much credit to his grandmother and mother; he regarded their support as vital to his own training, and this must have influenced him.

His mother, Ekan, founded two temples, Hōō-ji and Jōju-ji, the latter as a convent of which she was abbess. Keizan's veneration of the bodhisattva Guanyin (Kannon, in Japanese)—who is customarily represented as female in East Asian Buddhism—stemmed from or was enhanced by his mother's devotion to her.

Around 1323 or 1324, Keizan named Myōshō, his cousin (his mother's niece), abbess of Hōō-ji. Following his mother's example of teaching Buddhism to women, Keizan gave the first dharma transmission to a Sōtō nun to his student, Ekyū; Keizan had helped Ekyū by giving her copies of Dōgen's writings translated into Japanese, making them easier for her to follow than Chinese.

Keizan had a nunnery constructed near Yōkō-ji (eventually making Sonin the abbess) and ensured that funds were allocated for its continuing survival (Faure 2000: 42). It is believed that five monasteries for female monks (nuns) were established by Keizan (Matsuo 2010: 143). He also named Sonin, the wife of the original donor of Yōkō-ji, as a Dharma Heir (Faure 2000: 44); Keizan claimed that Sonin was the reincarnation of Myōchi, his grandmother.

== Writings ==
Keizan was the author of a number of works, including Zazen Yōjinki (Admonitions for Zazen, an important work on zazen), and the Denkōroku (Transmission of the Light), a series of fifty-one sermons that says the Sōtō lineage runs from Gautama Buddha through the Indian Ancestors from Bodhidharma and the Chinese Ancestors, and finally to the Japanese Ancestors Dōgen and his immediate successor at Eihei-ji, Ejō.

He also wrote an important text on monastic life and discipline, the Keizan’s Rules of Purity (Keizan shingi).

=== Teachings in the Denkōroku ===
Regarding Keizan's teaching, in his introduction to the Denkōroku, Francis Cook writes that Keizan's text focuses on two main topics. The first is the importance of being totally committed to achieving awakening and "making supreme effort in Zen practice". The second key theme in the Denkōroku is the "Light" that is transmitted from Zen master to the disciple who recognizes it within themselves. This is the very transmission of the heart of Zen that began with Shakyamuni Buddha, and it is also Buddha-nature itself.

Keizen uses numerous terms and epithets for this Light, including: "True Self," “That One,” “That Person,” “The Old Fellow,” and “The Lord of the House.” This is a distinctive feature of Keizan's teaching not found in Dōgen Nevertheless, this teaching is not uncommon in classic Zen (for example, see Linji's teachings). As Francis Cook describes it, this matter which "most clearly concerned Keizan" is "the self as the brilliant light of clear and alert knowing of events". He cites various past masters who speak of it in different ways, such as the "thoroughly clear knowing” (Daman Hongren), an “alert knowing” (Qingyuan Xingsi), “a clear and distinct, constant knowing” and “a perfectly clear knowing” (Dongshan Liangjie), and “boundless clarity and brightness” and “just alertness” (Xuedou Zhijian).

=== Keizan’s Rules of Purity ===
Keizan’s Rules of Purity (Keizan shingi 瑩山清規; T 82.423c–451c) is a Zen monastic text originally composed in 1324 as a practical handbook for Yōkō Zen Monastery, outlining its liturgical schedule and ritual regulations. The text provides a comprehensive calendar of daily, monthly, and annual observances to be performed by the monastery’s monks, together with the prescribed dedications of merit (ekō 回向) and statements of purpose (sho 疏) to be chanted on each occasion. It thus functioned both as a timetable of religious activities and a liturgical manual, including procedural instructions for monastic officers.

Keizan’s work closely parallels the Rules of Purity for the Huanzhu Hermitage (Genjūan shingi 幻住菴清規), compiled in 1317 by the Chinese Chan master Zhongfen Mingben (1263–1323), and was likely modeled on that or similar Yuan dynasty precedents.

In 1678, Gesshū Sōko (月舟宗胡; 1618–1696) and his disciple Manzan Dōhaku (1636–1715)—leaders of the Sōtō school fukko (“return to the old”) reform movement republished the work under the title Reverend Keizan’s Rules of Purity (Keizan oshō shingi 瑩山和尚清規). The text soon became a standard reference work in Sōtō Zen monasteries. In both structure and content, Keizan’s Rules of Purity served as a direct antecedent to the modern Standard Observances of the Sōtō Zen School (Sōtōshū gyōji kihan 曹洞宗行持規範).

== Notes ==
Buddhist titles
Preceded by Tettsū Gikai	Sōtō Zen ancestor 1309–1325	Succeeded by Gasan Jōseki & Meihō Sotetsu
