= Moppan =

Type of musical instrument of the percussion family

A moppan (木版), also called junshō-ban (巡照板), or kai-han, is a wooden board hit with a wooden mallet. Moppans are usually placed at the entrance of meditation halls in Japanese Zen monasteries.
