= Six Persimmons =

Painting by Muqi Fachang

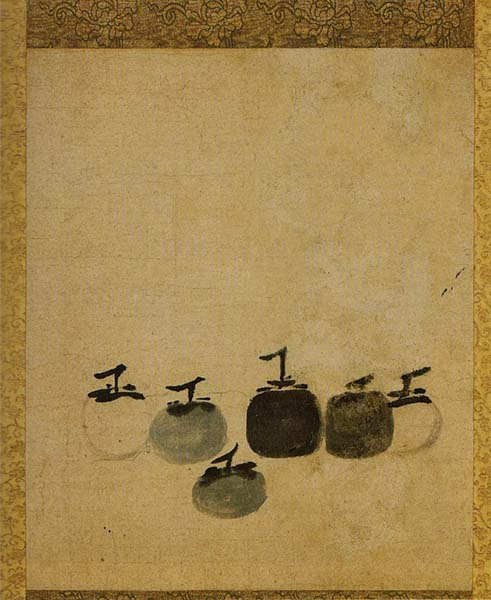
- Artist: Mu Qi
- Year: 13th Century
- Type: Ink on Paper
- Dimensions: 36.2 cm cm × 38.1 cm cm (14.25 in in × 15 in in)
- Location: Daitoku-ji, Kyoto, Japan

Six Persimmons (Chinese: 六柿圖; pinyin: liùshì tú) is a 13th-century Chinese painting by the monk Muqi Fachang. It was painted during the Song dynasty. Muqi was one of the two great exponents of the spontaneous mode of Chinese painting (the other being Liang Kai). It features six persimmons on an undefined background. It is painted in blue-black ink on paper.

The painting is often cited as an expression of Chan Buddhist ideals. The thick and thin brushstrokes that model the lightest of the persimmons make it seem to float in contrast to the darker one next to it. The treatment of the stems and leaves have been compared to Chinese characters. Professor James Cahill of the University of California Berkeley devoted a lecture to the image.

(Six Persimmons is) passion... congealed into a stupendous calm.

— Arthur Waley,

It is currently in the collection of the Juko'in subtemple of Daitoku-ji in Kyoto, Japan.

Gary Snyder referenced the image in his 2008 poem "Mu Ch'i's Persimmons".
