= Gasan Jōseki =

Gasan Jōseki 峨山韶碩
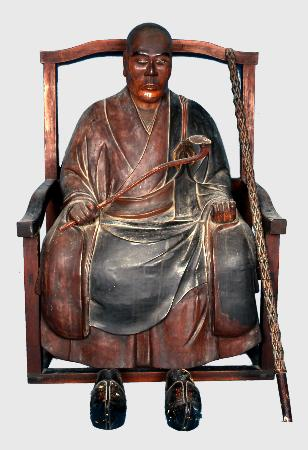
- Wooden statue of Gasan Jōseki held at the temple Yōkōji in Ishikawa Prefecture. It is believed to have been made during the Northern and Southern Courts Period (1336-1392). It was designated an Ishikawa Prefecture Cultural Property in 1993.
- Title: Zen Master

Personal life
- Born: 1275
- Died: 1366 (aged 90–91)

Religious life
- Religion: Buddhism
- School: Sōtō

Senior posting
- Teacher: Keizan Jōkin
- Predecessor: Keizan Jōkin
- Successor: Bassui Tokushō; Taigen Sōshin
- Students: Bassui Tokushō Taigen Sōshin Tsūgen Jakurei Mutan Sokan Daisetsu Sōrei Jippō Ryōshū.

Gasan Jōseki (峨山韶碩 1275–23 November 1366) was a Japanese Soto Zen monk. He was a disciple of Keizan Jokin, and his students included Bassui Tokushō, Taigen Sōshin, Tsūgen Jakurei, Mutan Sokan, Daisetsu Sōrei, and Jippō Ryōshū.

Later, he was designated the 2nd head of Sojiji Temple.
