= Jakushitsu Genkō =

Japanese Rinzai master, poet, flute player

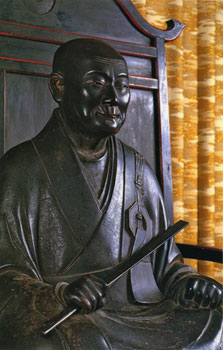
- Jakushitsu Genkō, was a notable poet and flute player.
- Title: Zen master poet 1st abbot of Eigen-ji

Personal life
- Born: June 23, 1290 Kamakura, Kanagawa, Japan
- Died: September 25, 1367 (aged 77)

Religious life
- Religion: Zen Buddhism
- School: Rinzai

Jakushitsu Genkō (寂室 元光; June 23, 1290 – September 25, 1367) was a Japanese Rinzai master, poet, flute player, and first abbot of Eigen-ji (constructed solely for him to teach Zen). His poetry is considered to be among the finest of Zen poetry. He traveled to China and studied Ch'an with masters of the Linji school from 1320 to 1326, then returned to Japan and lived for many years as a hermit. It was only toward the end of his life that he decided to teach Zen to others.

== See also ==
- Buddhism in Japan
- List of Rinzai Buddhists
