= Eigen-ji =

Buddhist temple in Higashiōmi, Japan

- 永源寺
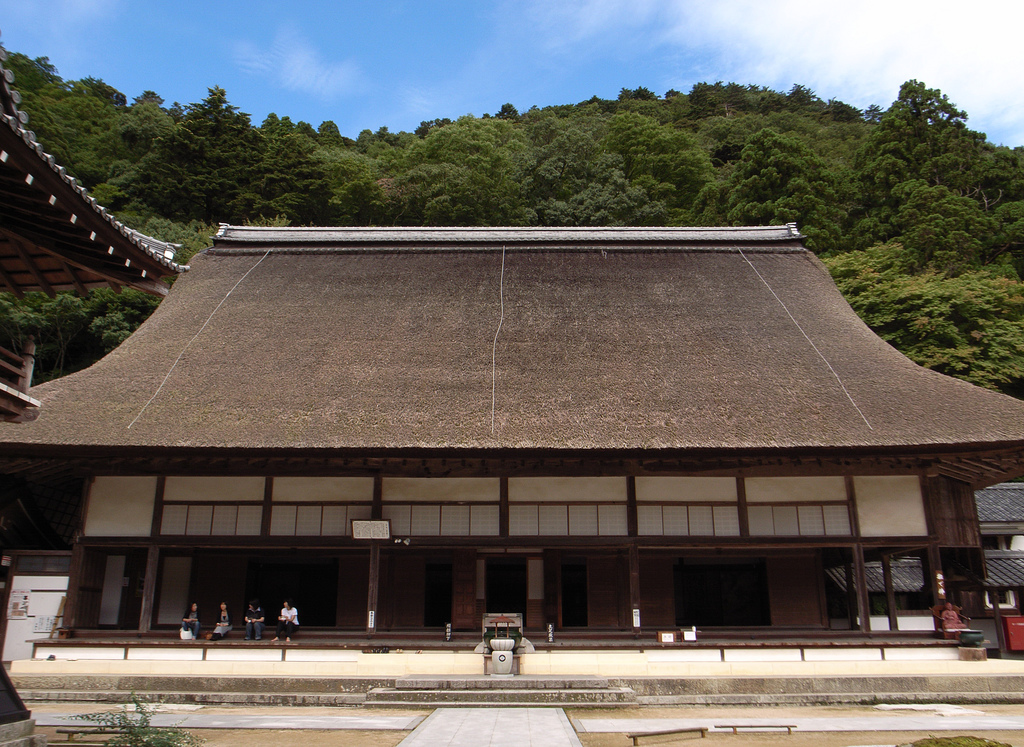
- Main Hall

- Hyakusai-ji Eigen-ji (Japan)

Religion
- Affiliation: Buddhist
- Deity: Yotsugi Kanzeon Bosatsu (Avalokiteśvara of prosperity to descendants)
- Rite: Rinzai school
- Status: Head Temple

Location
- Location: 41 Eigenjitakano-chō, Higashiōmi-shi, Shiga Prefecture
- Country: Japan
- Coordinates: 35°04′50″N 136°19′12″E

Architecture
- Founder: Sasaki Ujiyori and Jakushitsu Genkō
- Completed: 1361

Website
- Official website

Eigen-ji (永源寺) is a Buddhist temple in the Eigenji-Takano neighborhood of the city of Higashiōmi, Shiga Prefecture, Japan. It is the head temple of one of the 14 autonomous branches of the Rinzai school of Japanese Zen

== History ==
Eigen-ji was founded in 1361 by the famous poet and roshi Jakushitsu Genkō under the sponsorship of the shugo of Ōmi Province, Sasaki Ujinori.

At its peak, the temple had over 2000 priests and 56 chapels on the mountainside. During the Onin War, many priests from the Kyoto Gozan temple sought sanctuary at Eigen-ji; however, the temple burned down in 1492 and again in 1563 and fell into decline afterwards.

According to a tradition in Inabe city in Mie Prefecture, a priest from Eigen-ji escaped over the Suzuka Mountains into Ise Province bearing the temple's treasures when the temple was destroyed by Takigawa Kazumasa on orders of Oda Nobunaga in 1570; however, there are no records of such an event at Eigen-ji itself.

During the Edo period, the temple was revived by an abbot named Isshi Bunshu from Myōshin-ji in Kyoto, under the sponsorship of Emperor Go-Mizunoo, his consort Tofukumon-in and Hikone Domain.

== Present day ==
Today Eigen-ji is the head temple of the Eigen-ji branch of Rinzai Zen and governs more than 120 temples and one monastery.

The temple is a noted spot for hanami cherry blossom viewing in spring, with a variant of the sakura known as the "Eigenji-zakura" growing around the temple area. It is also known for the autumn colours of its maple trees in the autumn.

Because of the natural beauty surrounding the temple, it is one of the 100 Views of nature in Kansai.

== Principle image ==
The principle image of Eigen-ji temple is the Yotsugi Kannon. Legend has it that the first abbot of the temple, Jakushitsu, found a small Kannon statue on a rock near the temple. He invited the renowned Buddhist sculptor Gotokan to come to the temple and create a larger statue - inside which the small Kannon statue was embedded.

The principle image of Eigen-ji temple is a hibutus, or "hidden Buddha". The image is hidden from public view behind a set of closed doors. However, once every 25 years or so, the doors are temporarily opened so that worshippers can gain a glimpse of the statue. The last time that this occurred was in 2016.

== Gallery ==
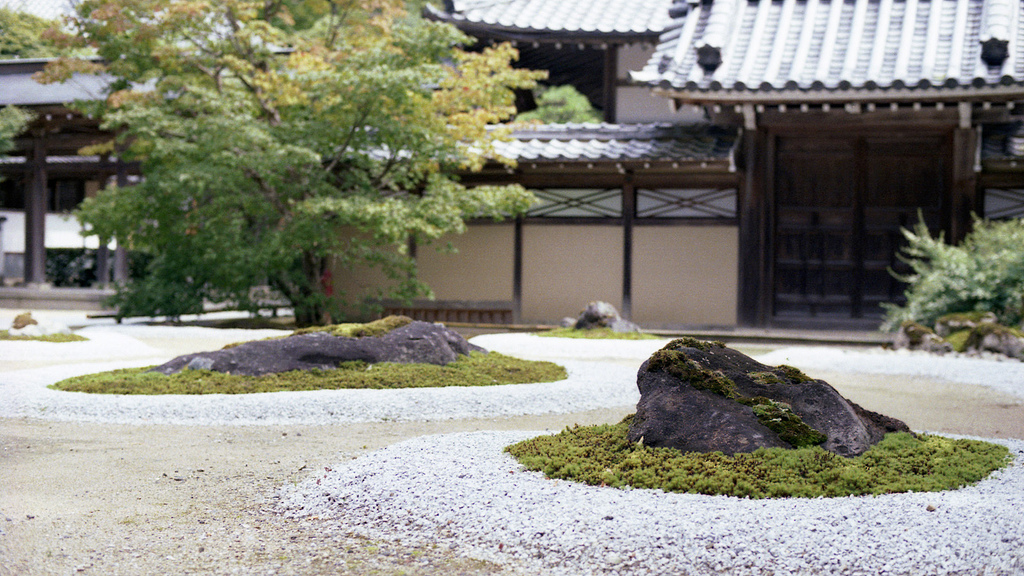

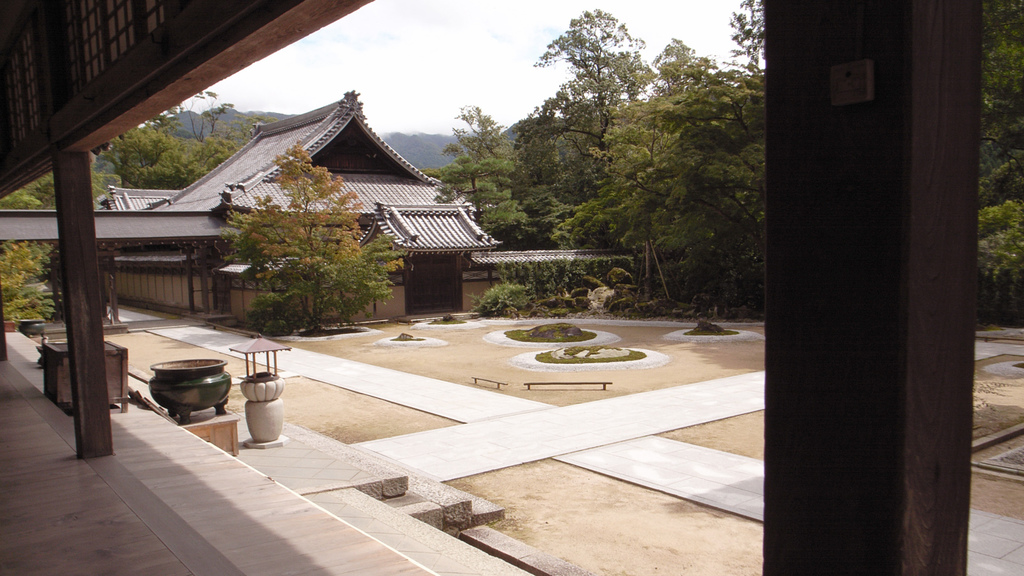

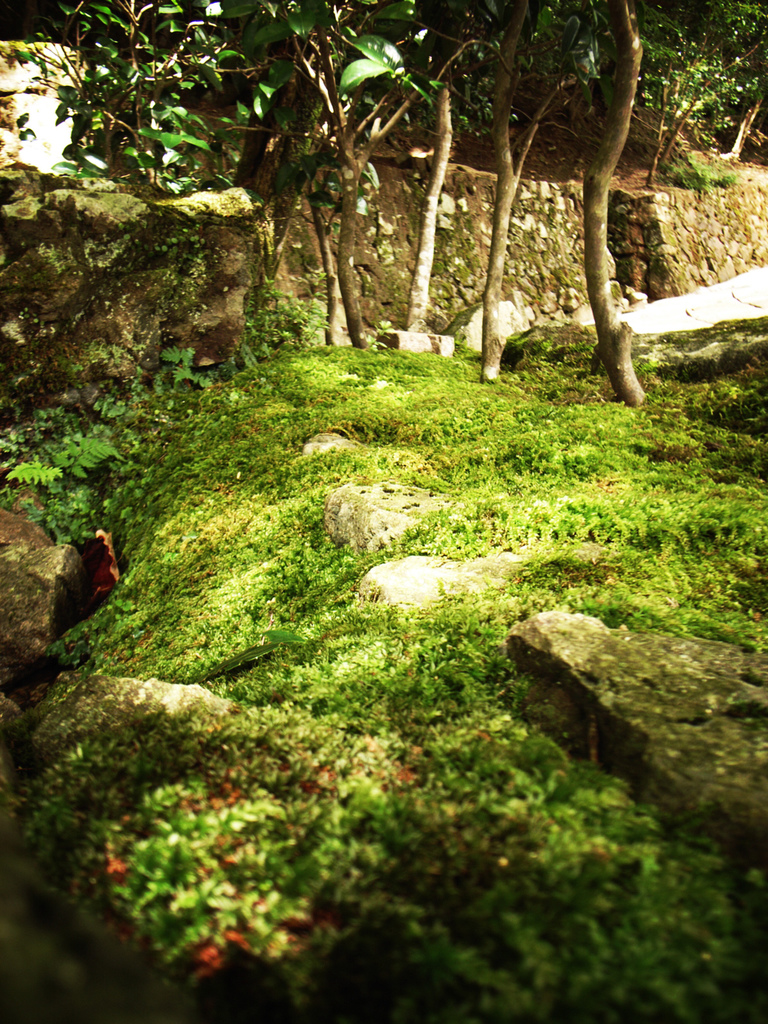

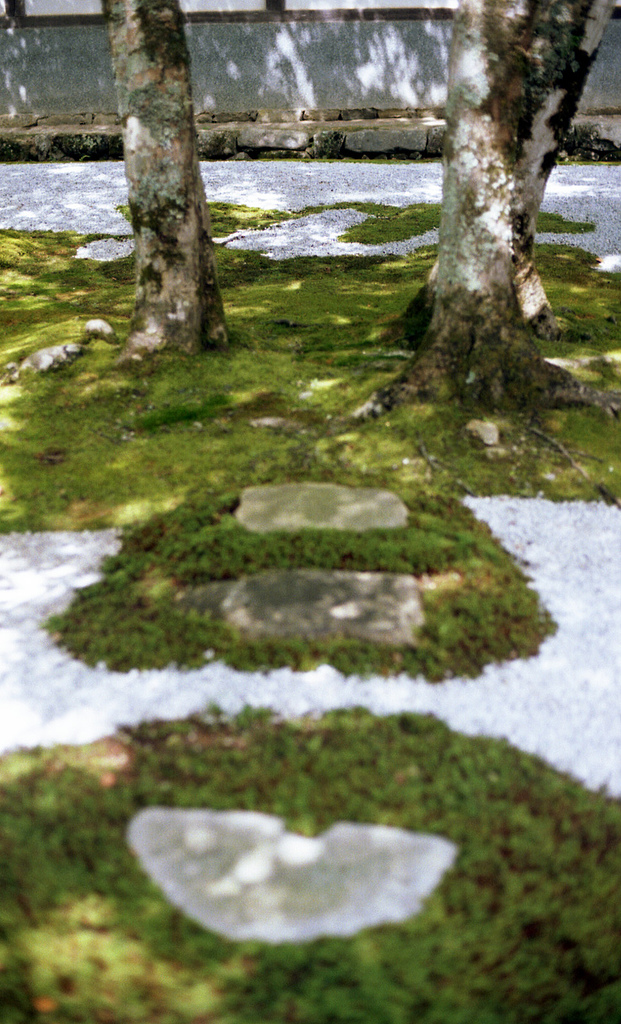

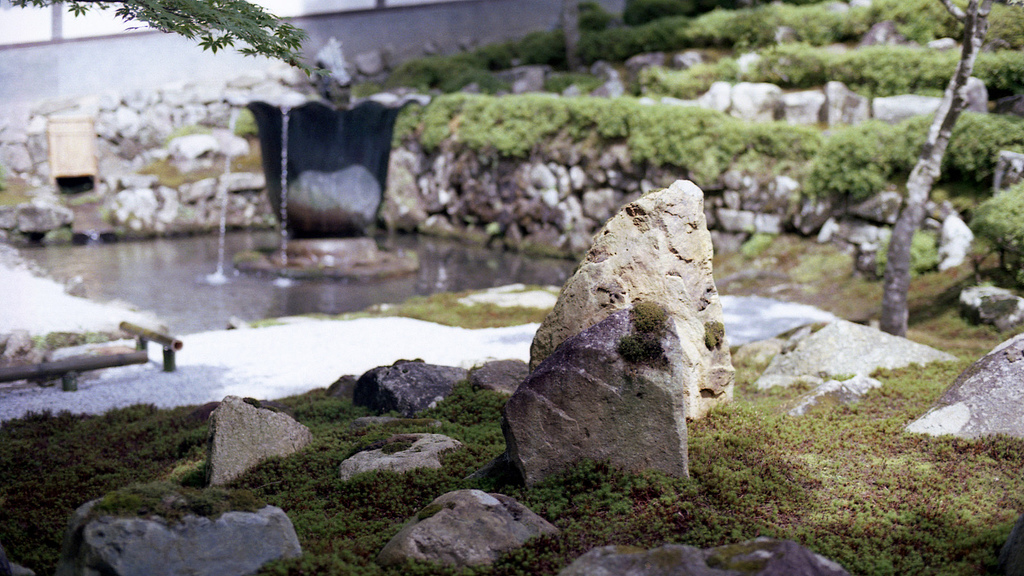

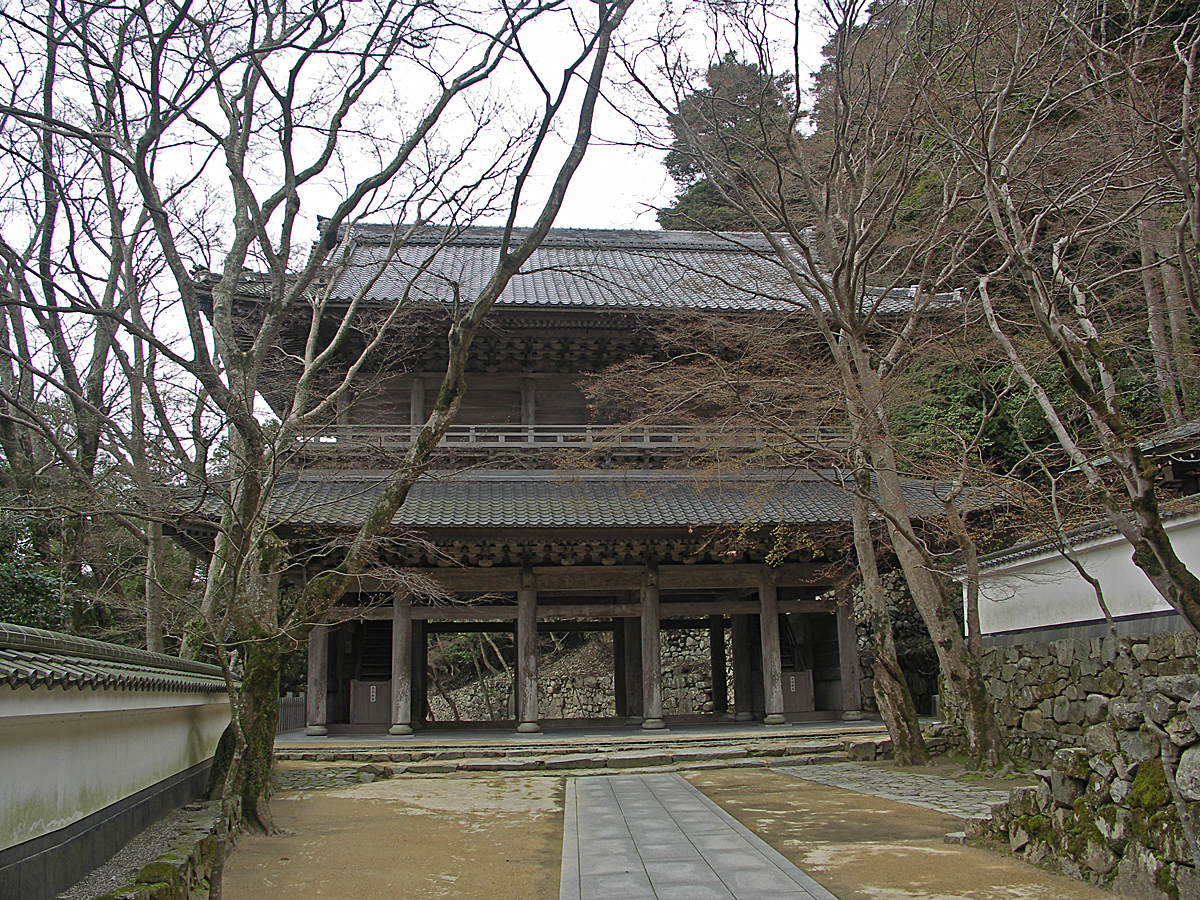
Sanmon

== See also ==
- The 100 Views of Nature in Kansai
