= Lengqie shizi ji =

The Léngqié Shīzī Jì (楞伽師資記) (Record of the Masters and Disciples of the Laṅkāvatāra Sūtra) is a lineage history of Chan Buddhism, attributed to Jìngjué (淨覺) (683 C.E. - 750 C.E.) and dated to around 713-716 C.E.

Alongside Du Fei’s Chuan fabao ji 傳法寶紀 (Record of the Transmission of the Dharma Jewel), also dated around 713 C.E., it is the earliest standalone lineage histories of Chan Buddhism known to exist. The extent of which text came first is debated: John R. McRae and Bernard Faure doubt that Jingjue knew Du Fei’s Chuan fabao ji when he composed the Lengqie shizi ji. Alan Cole, on the other hand, asserts that Jingjue drew directly on Du Fei’s text and reworked its genealogy to present his own teacher, Xuanze, as a legitimate successor.

A Classical Tibetan translation taken from the Mogao Caves in Dunhuang is held at the British Library, IOL Tib J 710/2. A full English translation can be found in J.C. Cleary's Zen Dawn and Sam van Schaik's The Spirit of Zen.

== Contents ==
The Léngqié Shīzī Jì offers biographies and teachings from the earliest masters of Chan Buddhism, similar to later records such as the Anthology of the Patriarchal Hall (Zutang ji) and The Record of the Transmission of the Lamp (Jǐngdé Chuándēng lù).

However, while later Chan histories offer a consensus on the lineage of Chan patriarchs (starting with Bodhidharma and continuing through Huike, Sengcan, Daoxin, Hongren, and Huineng), The Léngqié shīzī jì differs in two significant ways.

First, the lineage line begins with Guṇabhadra, the Indian monk who produced the earliest known Chinese translation of the Laṅkāvatāra Sūtra in 443, and then is followed by Bodhidharma. However, according to critical scholar Alan Cole, earlier biographical accounts suggest it is unlikely the two met each other.

Secondly, on Hongren's deathbed, he names eleven students he considers worthy of carrying on his teaching (including Huineng), but specifically highlights Shenxiu and Xuanze as the most worthy. The final chapter focuses on Shenxiu, Xuanze, and Lao’an as the seventh generation.

Alan Cole asserts this was likely done by the author Jìngjué in order to position his own teacher, Xuanze, as a legitimate successor to Hongren equal to Shenxiu. Cole goes as far to suggest there is reason to believe Xuanze is a fictional teacher invented by the author, as the work contains no full biography, no distinctive teaching, and no account of his death or burial.

As Sam van Schaik notes, Daoxin's chapter contains the first instance of a Zen teacher who left clear and specific instructions on how to practice sitting meditation.

He describes several meditation practices for “settling the mind” (ānxīn, 安心). Beginners are instructed to sit upright in a quiet place, relax the body, settle the breath, and observe bodily sensations and mental activity. In one practice, called “one-practice samādhi” (一行三昧), the practitioner continuously recites the name of a single Buddha. The text interprets recollecting the Buddha as recollecting the mind itself and describes the practice as leading to a state in which the distinction between observer and object falls away.

The chapter also lists five forms of meditation, covering recognition of the mind’s nature and activity, continuous awareness, contemplation of the body’s emptiness, and sustained attention to a single object. In the last exercise, the practitioner repeatedly brings wandering attention back to the object until the mind settles on its own. Other instructions call for observing thoughts as they arise and letting them come and go freely. At the same time, Daoxin warns that prolonged calming can produce dullness and that prolonged investigation can lead to distraction.
