= Faru =

Faru may refer to:

- Farukolhufushi or Faru, atoll in the Maldive
- Faru (monk), prominent Buddhist monk during the Tang Dynasty in China.
