= Bodhidharma =

Semi-legendary founder of Zen Buddhism

Names (details)
Known in English:	Bodhidharma
Bengali:	বোধিধর্ম
Burmese:	ဗောဓိဓမ္မ
Chinese abbreviation:	達摩
Hanyu Pinyin:	Pútídámó
Hindi:	बोधिधर्म
Hokkien:	Tatmo
Indonesian:	Budhi Darma
Japanese:	達磨 Daruma
Kannada:	ಬೋಧಿ ಧರ್ಮ
Khmer:	ពោធិធម៌ Poŭthĭthôrm
Korean:	달마 Dalma
Malay:	Dharuma
Malayalam:	ബോധിധർമ്മൻ Bodhidharman
Odia:	ବୋଧିଧର୍ମ Bodhidharma
Nepali:	बोधि धर्म
Persian:	بودی‌دارما
Sanskrit:	बोधिधर्म
Simplified Chinese:	菩提达摩
Sinhala:	බෝධිධර්ම
Tagalog:	Dharāma
Tamil:	போதிதருமன் Bhodhidharman
Telugu:	బోధిధర్మ
Thai:	ตั๊กม๊อ Takmoh
Tibetan:	Dharmottāra
Traditional Chinese:	菩提達摩
Vietnamese:	Bồ-đề-đạt-ma
Wade–Giles:	P'u-t'i-ta-mo
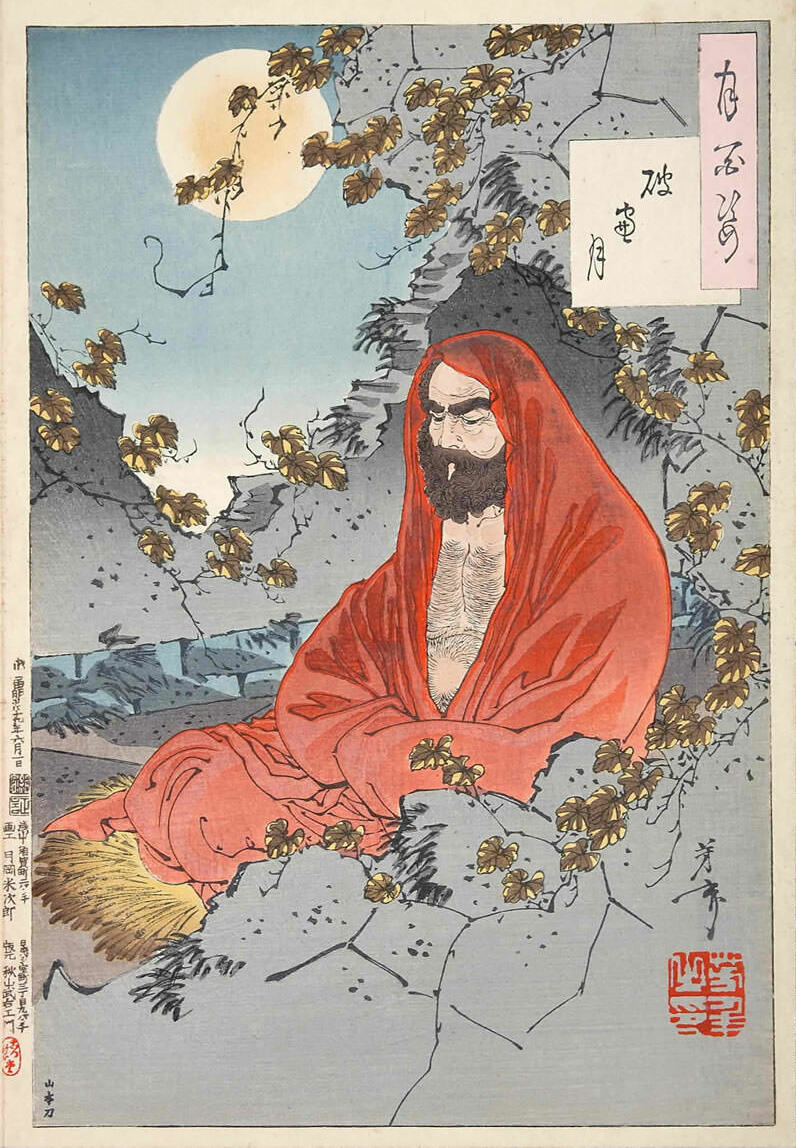
- Bodhidharma, Ukiyo-e woodblock print by Japanese artist Yoshitoshi, 1887
- Title: Chanshi; 1st Chan Patriarch

Religious life
- Religion: Buddhism
- School: Chan

Senior posting
- Successor: Huike
- Students: Huike

Bodhidharma was a semi-legendary Buddhist monk who lived during the 5th or 6th century CE. He is traditionally credited as the transmitter of Chan Buddhism to China, and is regarded as its first Chinese patriarch. (Note: Yampolski (2003, p. 3): "Tradition has it that Ch'an was brought to China by a monk, Bodhidharma [...] who is honored as the first Ch'an Patriarch in China.") He is also popularly regarded as the founder of Shaolin kung fu, an idea popularized in the 20th century, but based on the 17th-century Yijin Jing and the Daoist association of daoyin gymnastics with Bodhidharma. (Note: This argument is summarized by modern historian Lin Boyuan in his Zhongguo wushu shi. Lin (1996, p. 183): "As for the "Yi Jin Jing" (Muscle Change Classic), a spurious text attributed to Bodhidharma and included in the legend of his transmitting martial arts at the temple, it was written in the Ming dynasty, in 1624, by the Daoist priest Zining of Mt. Tiantai, and falsely attributed to Bodhidharma. Forged prefaces, attributed to the Tang general Li Jing and the Southern Song general Niu Gao were written. They say that, after Bodhidharma faced the wall for nine years at Shaolin temple, he left behind an iron chest; when the monks opened this chest they found the two books "Xi Sui Jing" (Marrow Washing Classic) and "Yi Jin Jing" within. The first book was taken by his disciple Huike, and disappeared; as for the second, "the monks selfishly coveted it, practicing the skills therein, falling into heterodox ways, and losing the correct purpose of cultivating the Real. The Shaolin monks have made some fame for themselves through their fighting skill; this is all due to having obtained this manuscript." Based on this, Bodhidharma was claimed to be the ancestor of Shaolin martial arts. This manuscript is full of errors, absurdities and fantastic claims; it cannot be taken as a legitimate source.") (Note: Henning & Green (2001, p. 129): "One of the most recently invented and familiar of the Shaolin historical narratives is a story that claims that the Indian monk Bodhidharma, the supposed founder of Chinese Chan (Zen) Buddhism, introduced boxing into the monastery as a form of exercise around a.d. 525. This story first appeared in a popular novel, The Travels of Lao T'san, published as a series in a literary magazine in 1907. This story was quickly picked up by others and spread rapidly through publication in a popular contemporary boxing manual, Secrets of Shaolin Boxing Methods, and the first Chinese physical culture history published in 1919. As a result, it has enjoyed vast oral circulation and is one of the most "sacred" of the narratives shared within Chinese and Chinese-derived martial arts. That this story is clearly a twentieth-century invention is confirmed by writings going back at least 250 years earlier, which mention both Bodhidharma and martial arts but make no connection between the two.)

Little contemporary biographical information on Bodhidharma exists, and subsequent accounts are layered with legend and unreliable details. (Note: There are three principal sources for Bodhidharma's biography (Dumoulin, Heisig & Knitter 2005, p. 85-90): Yang Xuanzhi's The Record of the Buddhist Monasteries of Luoyang (547); Tanlin's preface to the Two Entrances and Four Acts (6th century CE), which is also preserved in Ching-chüeh's Chronicle of the Lankavatar Masters (713–716) Dumoulin, Heisig & Knitter 2005, p. 88; Daoxuan's Further Biographies of Eminent Monks (7th century CE).) According to the principal Chinese sources, Bodhidharma came from the Western Regions, which typically refers to modern-day Xinjiang and Central Asia but can also include the Indian subcontinent. He is described as either a "Persian Central Asian" or a "South Indian [...] the third son of a great Indian king." (Note: The origins which are mentioned in these sources are: "[A] monk of the Western Region named Bodhidharma, a Persian Central Asian" c.q. "from Persia" (Buddhist monasteries, 547); "[A] South Indian of the Western Region. He was the third son of a great Indian king." (Tanlin, 6th century CE); "[W]ho came from South India in the Western Regions, the third son of a great Brahman king" c.q. "the third son of a Brahman of South India" (Lankavatara Masters, 713–716/ca. 715); "[O]f South Indian Brahman stock" c.q. "a Brahman monk from South India" (Further Biographies, 645).; Broughton further notes: "The guide's Bodhidharma is an Iranian, not an Indian. There is, however, nothing implausible about an early sixth-century Iranian Buddhist master who made his way to North China via the fabled Silk Road. This scenario is, in fact, more likely than a South Indian master who made his way by the sea route.") Aside from the Chinese accounts, several popular traditions also exist regarding Bodhidharma's origins. (Note: An Indian tradition regards Bodhidharma to be the third son of a Tamil Pallava king from Kanchipuram. The Tibetan and Southeast traditions consistently regard Bodhidharma as South Indian. Conversely, the Japanese tradition generally regards Bodhidharma as Persian.) Throughout Buddhist art, Bodhidharma is depicted as an ill-tempered, large-nosed, profusely bearded, wide-eyed non-Chinese person.

The accounts also differ on the date of his arrival. One early account claims that he arrived during the Liu Song dynasty (420–479 CE). Later accounts date his arrival to the Liang dynasty (502–557 CE). Bodhidharma was primarily active in the territory of the Northern Wei (386–534 CE). Modern scholarship dates him to about the early 5th century CE.

Bodhidharma's teachings and practice center on meditation and the Laṅkāvatāra Sūtra. The Anthology of the Patriarchal Hall (952) identifies Bodhidharma as the 28th Patriarch of Buddhism in an uninterrupted line that extends back to the Gautama Buddha himself.

== Names ==
Bodhidharma means 'dharma of awakening (bodhi)" in Sanskrit and was often shortened to simply Dharma in Chinese. Daruma is the shortened form in Japanese and from where the name of daruma dolls derives, themselves modelled after the monk.

Bodhidharma is associated with several other names, and is also known by the name Bodhitara. Faure notes that:

Bodhidharma's name appears sometimes truncated as Bodhi, or more often as Dharma (Ta-mo). In the first case, it may be confused with another of his rivals, Bodhiruci.

Bodhidharma is his dharma name. According to tradition, he was given this name by his teacher Prajnatara (or Prajñādhara and Panyatara). His name prior to monkhood is said to have been Jayavarman or Bodhidhana.

Tibetan sources give his name as "Bodhidharmottara" or "Dharmottara", that is, "Highest teaching (dharma) of enlightenment".

His traditional epithets in Chan texts include the "founder" (Chinese: 祖師; pinyin: zǔshī) as the first teacher of Chan in China, "golden rooster" (金雞; jīnjī), "bearded man" (鬍子; húzi), "pierced-ear guest" (穿耳客; chuān ěr kè, many Indian Buddhist monks wore earrings), "wall-gazing Brahmin" (壁觀婆羅門; bì guān póluómén) on account of his nine year meditation at the Shaolin Monastery by gazing at a wall (zazen), and "blue-eyed barbarian" (碧眼胡; bìyǎnhú, a general term for non-Han people from the Western regions).

== Biography ==
=== Principal sources ===
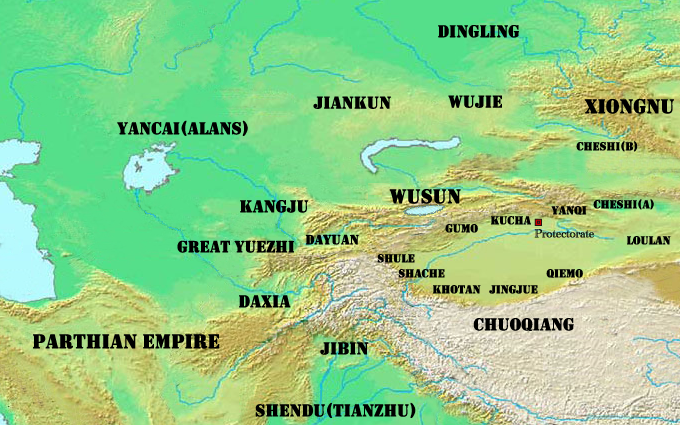
The Western Regions in the first century BCE

There are two known extant accounts written by contemporaries of Bodhidharma. According to these sources, Bodhidharma came from the Western Regions, and is described as either a "Persian Central Asian" or a "South Indian [...] the third son of a great Indian king." Later materials draw on these two sources, adding additional details, including a change to being descended from a Brahmin king, which accords with the reign of the Pallavas, who "claim[ed] to belong to a brahmin lineage."

The Western Regions was a historical name specified in the Chinese chronicles between the 3rd century BCE to the 8th century CE that referred to the regions west of Yumen Pass, most often Central Asia or sometimes, more specifically, the easternmost portion of it (e.g. Altishahr or the Tarim Basin in southern Xinjiang). Sometimes, it was used more generally to refer to other regions to the west of China as well, such as the Indian subcontinent (as in the novel Journey to the West).

==== The Record of the Buddhist Monasteries of Luoyang ====
The earliest text mentioning Bodhidharma is The Record of the Buddhist Monasteries of Luoyang (Chinese: 洛陽伽藍記 Luòyáng Qiélánjì) which was compiled in 547 by Yang Xuanzhi (楊衒之), a writer and translator of Mahayana sutras into Chinese. Yang gave the following account:

At that time there was a monk of the Western Region named Bodhidharma, a Persian Central Asian. (Note: According to Jorgensen, the mentioning by Yáng Xuànzhī of Bodhidharma as Persian is mistaken, since the Sassanian realm was not Buddhist. Johnston supposes that Yáng Xuànzhī mistook the name of the south-Indian Pallava dynasty for the name of the Sassanian Pahlavi dynasty.) He traveled from the wild borderlands to China. Seeing the golden disks on the pole on top of Yǒngníng's stupa reflecting in the sun, the rays of light illuminating the surface of the clouds, the jewel-bells on the stupa blowing in the wind, the echoes reverberating beyond the heavens, he sang its praises. He exclaimed: "Truly this is the work of spirits." He said: "I am 150 years old, and I have passed through numerous countries. There is virtually no country I have not visited. Even the distant Buddha-realms lack this." He chanted homage and placed his palms together in salutation for days on end.

The account of Bodhidharma in the Luoyan Record does not particularly associate him with meditation, but rather depicts him as a thaumaturge capable of mystical feats. This may have played a role in his subsequent association with the martial arts and esoteric knowledge.

==== Tanlin – preface to the Two Entrances and Four Acts ====
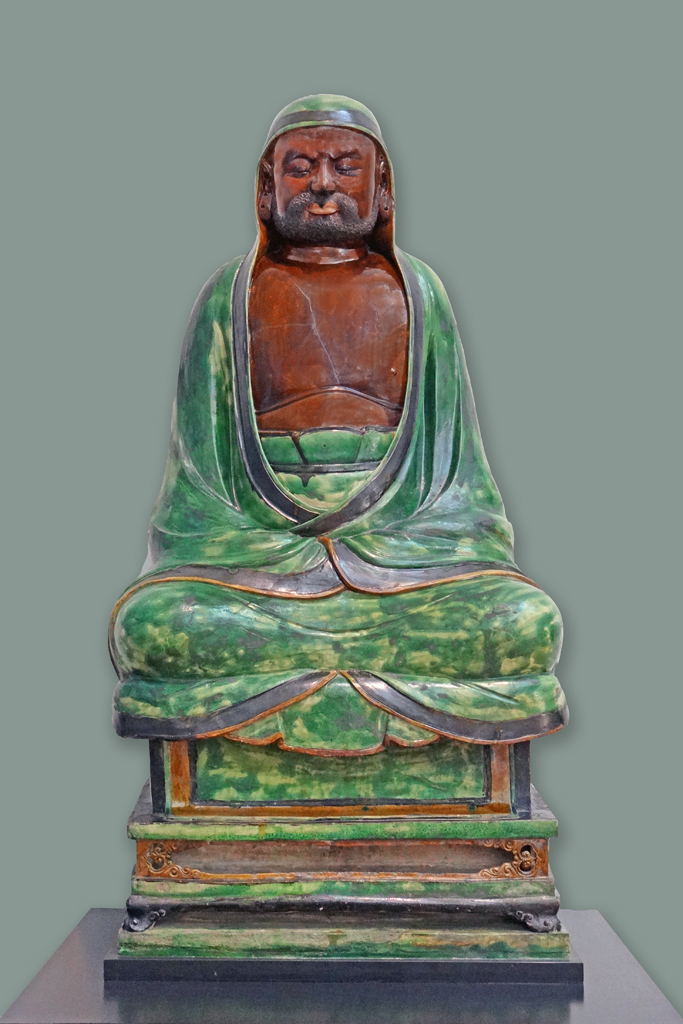
Ming dynasty (1368–1683) sandstone statue of a seated Bodhidharma (Chinese: 達磨; Pinyin: Dámó). 1484.

The second account was written by Tanlin (曇林; 506–574). Tanlin's brief biography of the "Dharma Master" is found in his preface to the Long Scroll of the Treatise on the Two Entrances and Four Practices, a text traditionally attributed to Bodhidharma and the first text to identify him as South Indian:

The Dharma Master was a South Indian of the Western Region. He was the third son of a great Indian king. His ambition lay in the Mahayana path, and so he put aside his white layman's robe for the black robe of a monk [...] Lamenting the decline of the true teaching in the outlands, he subsequently crossed distant mountains and seas, traveling about propagating the teaching in Han and Wei.

Tanlin's account was the first to mention that Bodhidharma attracted disciples, specifically mentioning Daoyu (道育) and Dazu Huike (慧可), the latter of whom would later figure very prominently in the Bodhidharma literature. Although Tanlin has traditionally been considered a disciple of Bodhidharma, it is more likely that he was a student of Huike.

==== Record of the Masters and Students of the Laṅka ====
The Record of the Masters and Students of the Laṅka (Léngqié Shīzī Jì 楞伽師資記), which survives both in Chinese and in Tibetan translation (although the surviving Tibetan translation is apparently of older provenance than the surviving Chinese version), states that Bodhidharma is not the first ancestor of Zen, but instead the second. This text instead claims that Guṇabhadra, the translator of the Laṅkāvatāra Sūtra, is the first ancestor in the lineage. It further states that Bodhidharma was his student. The Tibetan translation is estimated to have been made in the late eighth or early ninth century, indicating that the original Chinese text was written at some point before that.

Tanlin's preface has also been preserved in Jingjue's (683–750) Lengjie Shizi ji "Chronicle of the Laṅkāvatāra Masters", which dates from 713 to 716./ca. 715 He writes,

The teacher of the Dharma, who came from South India in the Western Regions, the third son of a great Brahman king."

==== "Further Biographies of Eminent Monks" ====
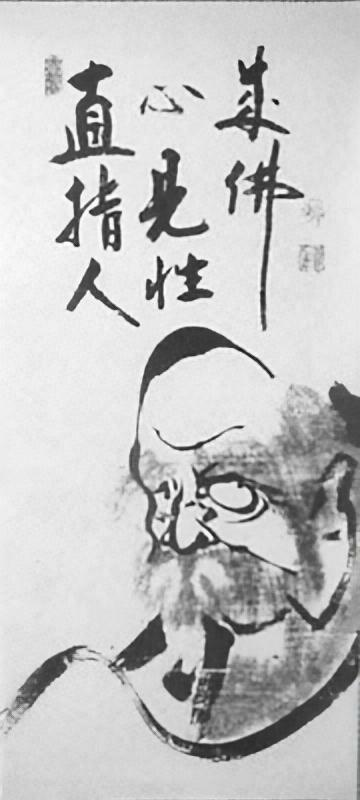
This Japanese scroll calligraphy of Bodhidharma reads, "Zen points directly to the human heart, see into your nature and become Buddha." It was created by Hakuin Ekaku (1686 to 1769).

In the 7th-century historical work "Further Biographies of Eminent Monks" (續高僧傳 Xù gāosēng zhuàn), Daoxuan (道宣) possibly drew on Tanlin's preface as a basic source, but made several significant additions:

Firstly, Daoxuan adds more detail concerning Bodhidharma's origins, writing that he was of "South Indian Brahman stock" (南天竺婆羅門種 nán tiānzhú póluómén zhŏng).

Secondly, more detail is provided concerning Bodhidharma's journeys. Tanlin's original is imprecise about Bodhidharma's travels, saying only that he "crossed distant mountains and seas" before arriving in Wei. Daoxuan's account, however, implies "a specific itinerary": "He first arrived at Nan-yüeh during the Sung period. From there, he turned north and came to the Kingdom of Wei" This implies that Bodhidharma had travelled to China by sea and that he had crossed over the Yangtze.

Thirdly, Daoxuan suggests a date for Bodhidharma's arrival in China. He writes that Bodhidharma makes landfall in the time of the Song, thus making his arrival no later than the time of the Song's fall to the Southern Qi in 479.

Finally, Daoxuan provides information concerning Bodhidharma's death. Bodhidharma, he writes, died at the banks of the Luo River, where he was interred by his disciple Dazu Huike, possibly in a cave. According to Daoxuan's chronology, Bodhidharma's death must have occurred prior to 534, the date of the Northern Wei's fall, because Dazu Huike subsequently leaves Luoyang for Ye. Furthermore, citing the shore of the Luo River as the place of death might possibly suggest that Bodhidharma died in the mass executions at Heyin (河陰) in 528. Supporting this possibility is a report in the Chinese Buddhist canon stating that a Buddhist monk was among the victims at Héyīn.

=== Later accounts ===
==== Anthology of the Patriarchal Hall ====
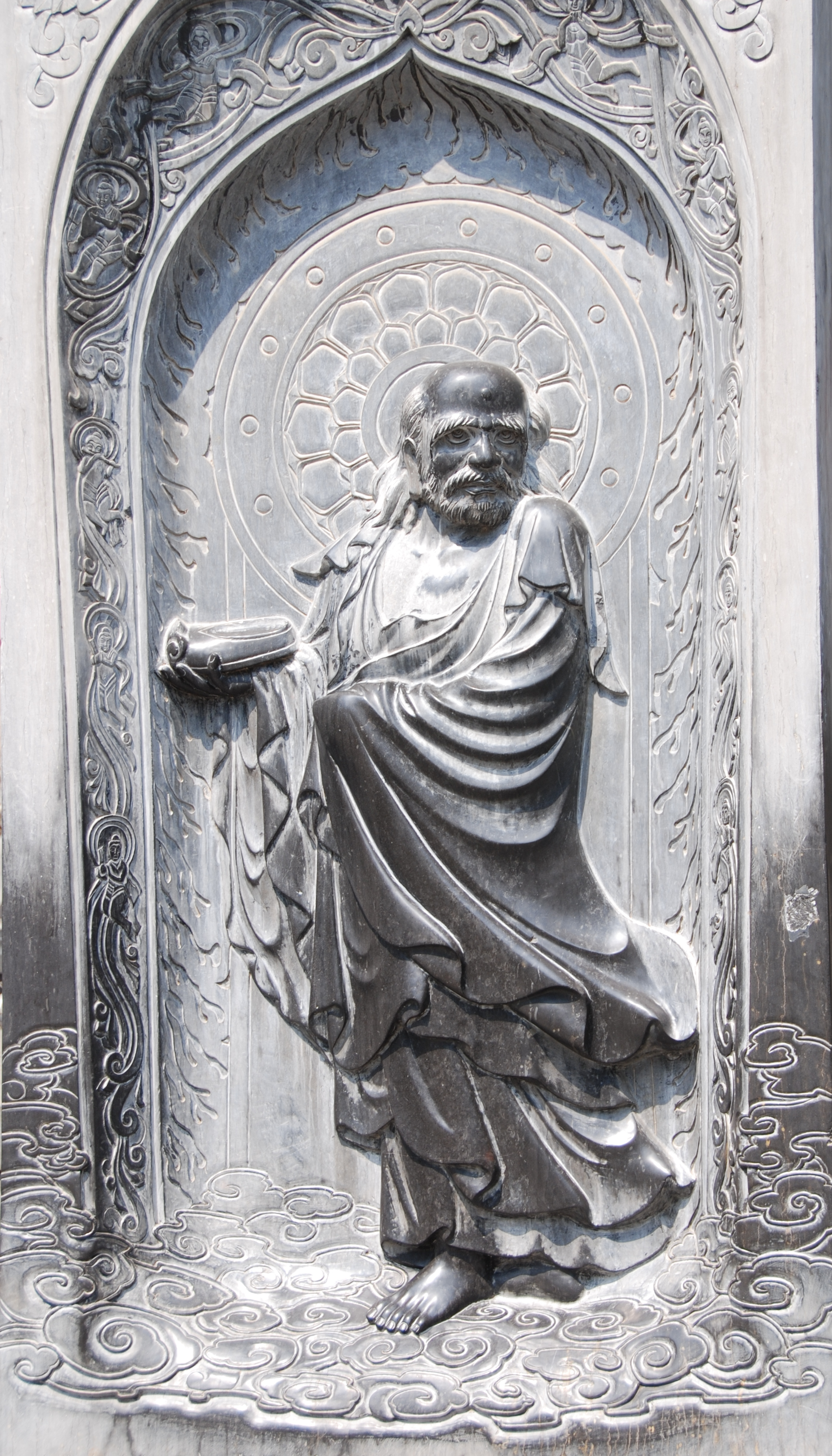
Bodhidharma, stone carving in Shaolin Temple

In the Anthology of the Patriarchal Hall (祖堂集 Zǔtángjí) of 952, the elements of the traditional Bodhidharma story are in place. Bodhidharma is said to have been a disciple of Prajñātāra, thus establishing the latter as the 27th patriarch in India. After a three-year journey, Bodhidharma reached China in 527, during the Liang (as opposed to the Song in Daoxuan's text). The Anthology of the Patriarchal Hall includes Bodhidharma's encounter with Emperor Wu of Liang, which was first recorded around 758 in the appendix to a text by Shenhui (神會), a disciple of Huineng.

Finally, as opposed to Daoxuan's figure of "over 180 years," the Anthology of the Patriarchal Hall states that Bodhidharma died at the age of 150. He was then buried on Mount Xiong'er (熊耳山), to the west of Luoyang. However, three years after the burial, in the Pamir Mountains, Song Yun (宋雲)—an official of one of the later Wei kingdoms—encountered Bodhidharma, who claimed to be returning to India and was carrying a single sandal. Bodhidharma predicted the death of Song Yun's ruler, a prediction which was borne out upon the latter's return. Bodhidharma's tomb was then opened, and only a single sandal was found inside.

According to the Anthology of the Patriarchal Hall, Bodhidharma left the Liang court in 527 and relocated to Mount Song near Luoyang and the Shaolin Monastery, where he "faced a wall for nine years, not speaking for the entire time", his date of death can have been no earlier than 536. Moreover, his encounter with the Wei official indicates a date of death no later than 554, three years before the fall of the Western Wei.

==== Daoyuan – Transmission of the Lamp ====
Subsequent to the Anthology of the Patriarchal Hall, the only dated addition to the biography of Bodhidharma is in the Jingde Records of the Transmission of the Lamp (景德傳燈錄 Jĭngdé chuándēng lù, published 1004 CE), by Daoyuan (道原), in which it is stated that Bodhidharma's original name had been Bodhitāra but was changed by his master Prajñātāra. The same account is given by the Japanese master Keizan's 13th-century work of the same title.

=== Popular traditions ===
Several contemporary popular traditions also exist regarding Bodhidharma's origins. An Indian tradition regards Bodhidharma to be the third son of a Pallava king from Kanchipuram. This is consistent with the Southeast Asian traditions which also describe Bodhidharma as a former South Indian Tamil prince who had awakened his kundalini and renounced royal life to become a monk. The Tibetan version similarly characterises him as a South Indian. Conversely, the Japanese tradition generally regards Bodhidharma as a red-haired Persian.

== Practice and teaching ==
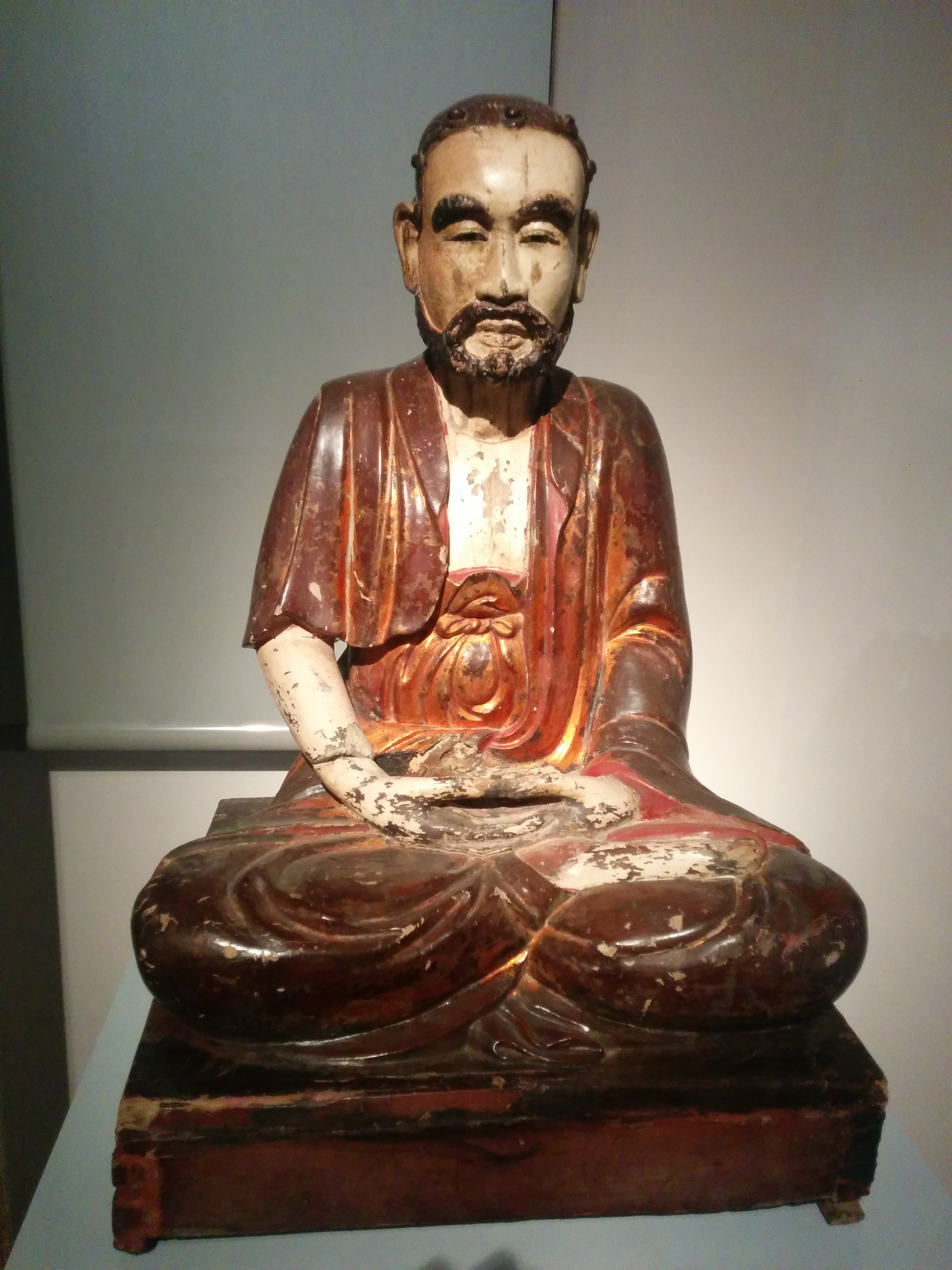
Bodhidharma statue, 19th century, Vietnam

=== Two Entrances and Four Practices ===
Bodhidharma is traditionally seen as introducing a Mahayana Buddhist practice of dhyana (meditation) in China. According to modern scholars, like the Japanese scholar of Chan Yanagida Seizan, generally hold that the Two Entrances and Four Practices (二入四行論) is the only extant work that can be attributed to Bodhidharma and as such, this is the main source for our knowledge of his teaching.

According to this text, Bodhidharma taught two "entrances" to the Dharma. The first is a subitist teaching that directly apprehends the ultimate principle, that is, the true nature or buddha-nature. The second entrance deals with four practices: (1) accepting all our sufferings as the fruit of past karma, (2) accept our circumstances with equanimity, (3) to be without craving, and (4) to let go of wrong thoughts and practice the six perfections.

According to Yanagida Seizan, the first "entrance of principle", was a subitist teaching which derives from the sudden enlightenment thought of Tao-sheng; while the four practices are a reworking of the "four foundations of mindfulness", which were popular in the late Six Dynasties period Buddhist meditation circles.

=== Wall-gazing ===
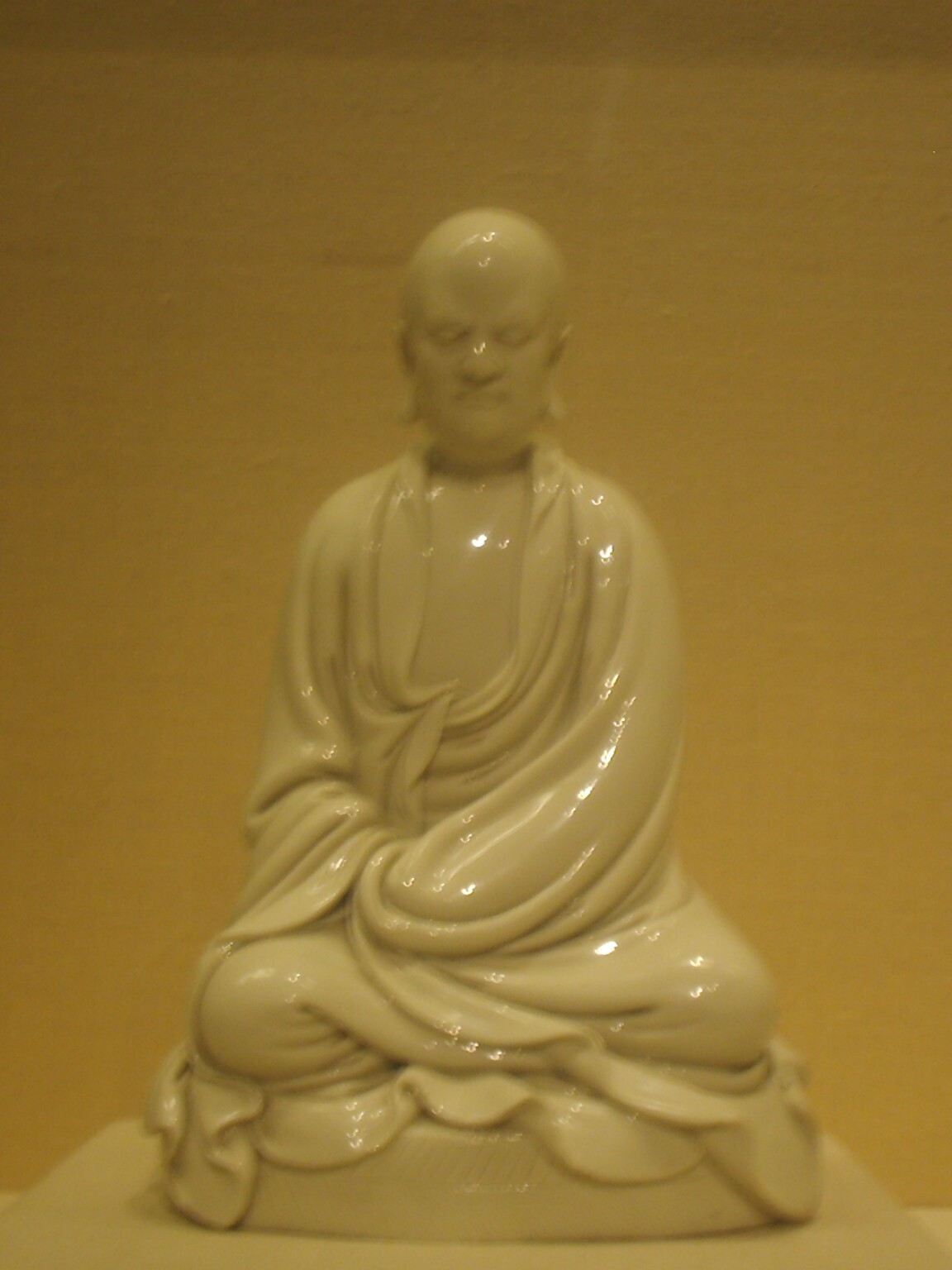
A Dehua ware porcelain statuette of Bodhidharma from the late Ming dynasty, 17th century

Tanlin, in the preface to Two Entrances and Four Practices, and Daoxuan, in the Further Biographies of Eminent Monks, mentions a practice of Bodhidharma's termed "wall-gazing" (壁觀 bìguān). Both Tanlin (Note: translates 壁觀 as "wall-examining".) and Daoxuan associate this "wall-gazing" with "quieting [the] mind" (Chinese: 安心; pinyin: ānxīn).

In the Two Entrances and Four Practices, the term "wall-gazing" is given as follows:

Those who turn from delusion back to reality, who meditate on walls, the absence of self and other, the oneness of mortal and sage, and who remain unmoved even by scriptures are in complete and unspoken agreement with reason. (Note: offers a more literal rendering of the key phrase 凝住壁觀 (níngzhù bìguān) as "[who] in a coagulated state abides in wall-examining".)

Daoxuan states, "the merits of Mahāyāna wall-gazing are the highest". These are the first mentions in the historical record of what may be a type of meditation being ascribed to Bodhidharma. Exactly what sort of practice Bodhidharma's "wall-gazing" was remains uncertain. Nearly all accounts have treated it either as an undefined variety of meditation, as Daoxuan and Dumoulin, or as a variety of seated meditation akin to the zazen (Chinese: 坐禪; pinyin: zuòchán) that later became a defining characteristic of Chan. The latter interpretation is particularly common among those working from a Chan standpoint.

There have also, however, been interpretations of "wall-gazing" as a non-meditative phenomenon. (Note: viz., where a Tibetan Buddhist interpretation of "wall-gazing" as being akin to Dzogchen is offered.) Jeffrey Broughton points out that where Bodhidharma's teachings appear in Tibetan translation among the Dunhuang manuscripts, the Chinese phrase "in a coagulated state abides in wall-examining" (ning chu pi-kuan) is replaced in Tibetan with "rejects discrimination and abides in brightness" (rtogs pa spangs te | lham mer gnas na). (Note: Stein Tibetan 710, which is a Tibetan translation of the Lengqie shizi ji, is an exception to this. It has: "remains in purity and gazes at the wall-surface.") Broughton sees this as a curious divergence, as Tibetan translations of Chinese Chan texts are usually quite literal. He concludes that in early Tibet, "wall examining" did not refer to a literal practice of sitting cross-legged facing a wall.

=== The Laṅkāvatāra Sūtra ===
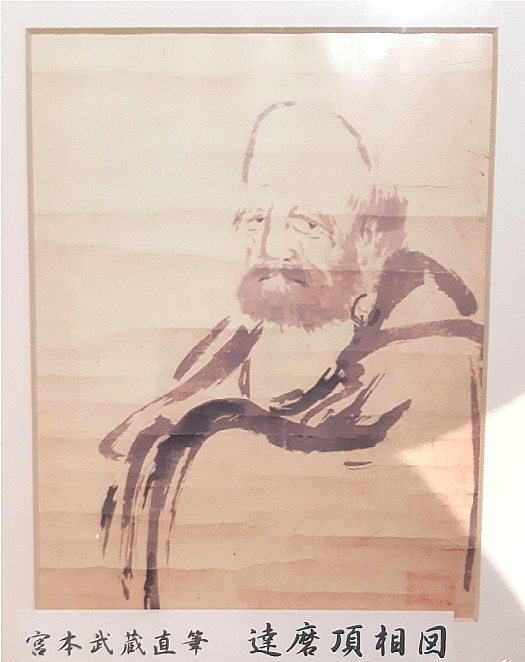
Bodhidharma (Chinese: 達磨; Hiragana: だるま; Romaji: Daruma), painted by Miyamoto Musashi, swordsman, artist and philosopher who was close to Takuan Soho, a monk of the Rinzai sect, who was linked to the samurai caste

There are early texts which explicitly associate Bodhidharma with the Laṅkāvatāra Sūtra. Daoxuan, for example, in a late recension of his biography of Bodhidharma's successor Huike, has the sūtra as a basic and important element of the teachings passed down by Bodhidharma:

In the beginning, Dhyana Master Bodhidharma took the four-roll Laṅkā Sūtra, handed it over to Huike, and said: "When I examine the land of China, it is clear that there is only this sutra. If you rely on it to practice, you will be able to cross over the world."

Another early text, the "Record of the Masters and Disciples of the Laṅkāvatāra Sūtra" (Chinese: 楞伽師資記; pinyin: Léngqié Shīzī Jì) of Jingjue (淨覺; 683–750), also mentions Bodhidharma in relation to this text. Jingjue's account also makes explicit mention of "sitting meditation" or zuochan/zazen:

For all those who sat in meditation, Master Bodhi[dharma] also offered expositions of the main portions of the Laṅkāvatāra Sūtra, which are collected in a volume of twelve or thirteen pages [...] bearing the title of "Teaching of [Bodhi-]Dharma".

In other early texts, the school that would later become known as Chan Buddhism is sometimes referred to as the "Laṅkāvatāra school" (楞伽宗 Léngqié zōng).

The Laṅkāvatāra Sūtra, one of the Mahayana sutras, is a highly "difficult and obscure" text whose basic thrust is to emphasize "the inner enlightenment that does away with all duality and is raised above all distinctions". It is among the first and most important texts for East Asian Yogācāra.

According to Suzuki, one of the recurrent emphases in the Laṅkāvatāra Sūtra is a lack of reliance on words to effectively express reality:

If, Mahamati, you say that because of the reality of words the objects are, this talk lacks in sense. Words are not known in all the Buddha-lands; words, Mahamati, are an artificial creation. In some Buddha-lands ideas are indicated by looking steadily, in others by gestures, in still others by a frown, by the movement of the eyes, by laughing, by yawning, or by the clearing of the throat, or by recollection, or by trembling.

In contrast to the ineffectiveness of words, the sūtra instead stresses the importance of the "self-realization" that is "attained by noble wisdom" and, according to Suzuki, occurs "when one has an insight into reality as it is": "The truth is the state of self-realization and is beyond categories of discrimination". According to Suzuki, reflecting his own emphasis on kensho, the sūtra goes on to outline the ultimate effects of an experience of self-realization:

[The bodhisattva] will become thoroughly conversant with the noble truth of self-realization, will become a perfect master of his own mind, will conduct himself without effort, will be like a gem reflecting a variety of colours, will be able to assume the body of transformation, will be able to enter into the subtle minds of all beings, and, because of his firm belief in the truth of Mind-only, will, by gradually ascending the stages, become established in Buddhahood.

== Legends about Bodhidharma ==
Several stories about Bodhidharma have become popular legends, which are still being used in the Chan, Seon, and Zen-tradition.

=== Encounter with Emperor Wu of Liang ===
The Anthology of the Patriarchal Hall says that in 527, Bodhidharma visited Emperor Wu of Liang, a fervent patron of Buddhism:

Emperor Wu: "How much karmic merit have I earned for ordaining Buddhist monks, building monasteries, having sutras copied, and commissioning Buddha images?"
Bodhidharma: "None. Good deeds done with worldly intent bring good karma, but no merit."
Emperor Wu: "So what is the highest meaning of noble truth?"
Bodhidharma: "There is no noble truth, there is only emptiness."
Emperor Wu: "Then, who is standing before me?"
Bodhidharma: "I know not, Your Majesty."

This encounter was included as the first kōan of the Blue Cliff Record.

=== Nine years of wall-gazing ===
Dazu Huike offering his arm to Bodhidharma. Ink painting by Sesshū Tōyō, 1496, Muromachi period, Japan

Failing to make a favorable impression in South China, Bodhidharma is said to have travelled to the Shaolin Monastery. After either being refused entry or being ejected after a short time, he lived in a nearby cave, where he "faced a wall for nine years, not speaking for the entire time".

The biographical tradition is littered with apocryphal tales about Bodhidharma's life and circumstances. In one version of the story, he is said to have fallen asleep seven years into his nine years of wall-gazing. Becoming angry with himself, he cut off his eyelids to prevent it from happening again. According to the legend, as his eyelids hit the floor the first tea plants sprang up, and thereafter, tea would provide a stimulant to help keep students of Chan awake during zuochan (zazen).

The most popular account relates that Bodhidharma was admitted into the Shaolin temple after nine years in the cave and taught there for some time. However, other versions report that he "passed away, seated upright"; or that he disappeared, leaving behind the Yijin Jing; or that his legs atrophied after nine years of sitting, which is why Daruma dolls have no legs.

=== Huike cuts off his arm ===
In one legend, Bodhidharma refused to resume teaching until his would-be student, Dazu Huike, who had kept vigil for weeks in the deep snow outside of the monastery, cut off his own left arm to demonstrate sincerity. (Note: Daoxuan records that Huìkě's arm was cut off by bandits.)

=== Transmission ===
==== Skin, flesh, bone, marrow ====
Jingde Records of the Transmission of the Lamp (景德传灯录) of Daoyuan, presented to the emperor in 1004, records that Bodhidharma wished to return to India and called together his disciples:

Bodhidharma asked, "Can each of you say something to demonstrate your understanding?"
Dao Fu stepped forward and said, "It is not bound by words and phrases, nor is it separate from words and phrases. This is the function of the Tao."
Bodhidharma: "You have attained my skin."
The nun Zong Chi (Note: Various names are given for this nun. Zōngzhǐ is also known by her title Soji, and by Myoren, her nun name. In the Jǐngdé Records of the Transmission of the Lamp, Dharani repeats the words said by the nun Yuanji in the Two Entrances and Four Acts, possibly identifying the two with each other. Heng-Ching Shih states that according to the Jǐngdé chuándēng lù 景德传灯录 the first `bhikṣuni` mentioned in the Chán literature was a disciple of the First Chan Patriarch, Bodhidharma, known as Zōngzhǐ 宗旨 [early-mid 6th century]) (Note: In the Shōbōgenzō 正法眼蔵 chapter called Katto ("Twining Vines") by Dōgen Zenji (道元禅師), she is named as one of Bodhidharma's four Dharma heirs. Although the First Patriarch's line continued through another of the four, Dogen emphasizes that each of them had a complete understanding of the teaching.) stepped up and said, "It is like a glorious glimpse of the realm of Akshobhya Buddha. Seen once, it need not be seen again."
Bodhidharma; "You have attained my flesh."
Dao Yu said, "The four elements are all empty. The five skandhas are without actual existence. Not a single dharma can be grasped."
Bodhidharma: "You have attained my bones."
Finally, Huike came forth, bowed deeply in silence and stood up straight.
Bodhidharma said, "You have attained my marrow."

Bodhidharma passed on the symbolic robe and bowl of dharma succession to Dazu Huike and, some texts claim, a copy of the Laṅkāvatāra Sūtra. Bodhidharma then either returned to India or died.

=== Bodhidharma at Shaolin ===
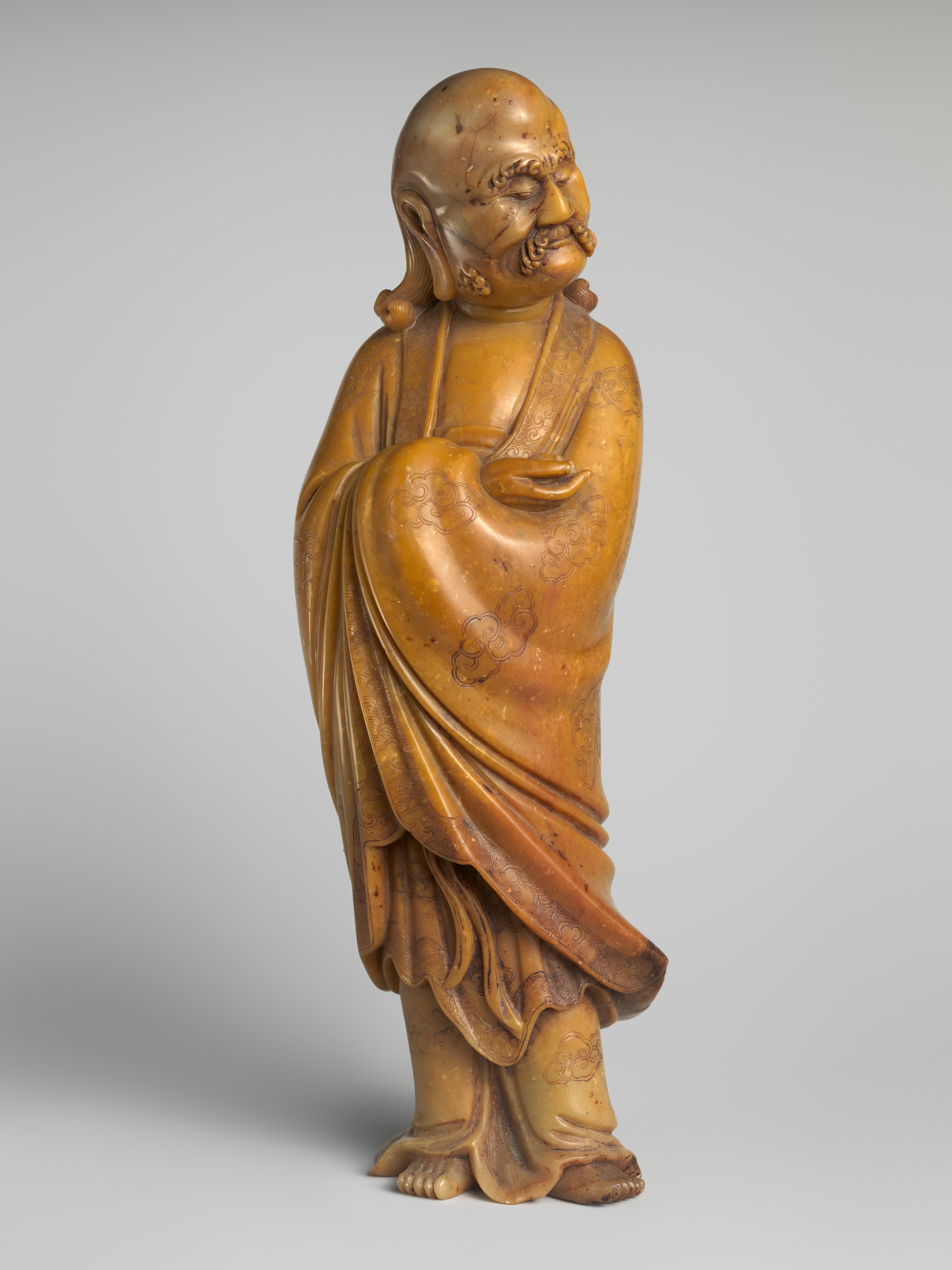
Qing dynasty (1644–1911) statuette of Bodhidharma. 19th century

Some Chinese myths and legends describe Bodhidharma as being disturbed by the poor physical shape of the Shaolin monks, after which, he instructed them in techniques to maintain their physical condition as well as teaching meditation. He is said to have taught a series of external exercises called the Eighteen Arhat Hands and an internal practice called the Sinew Metamorphosis Classic. In addition, after his departure from the temple, two manuscripts by Bodhidharma were said to have been discovered inside the temple: the Yijin Jing and the Xisui Jing. Copies and translations of the Yijin Jing survive to the modern day. The Xisui Jing has been lost.

=== Travels in Southeast Asia ===
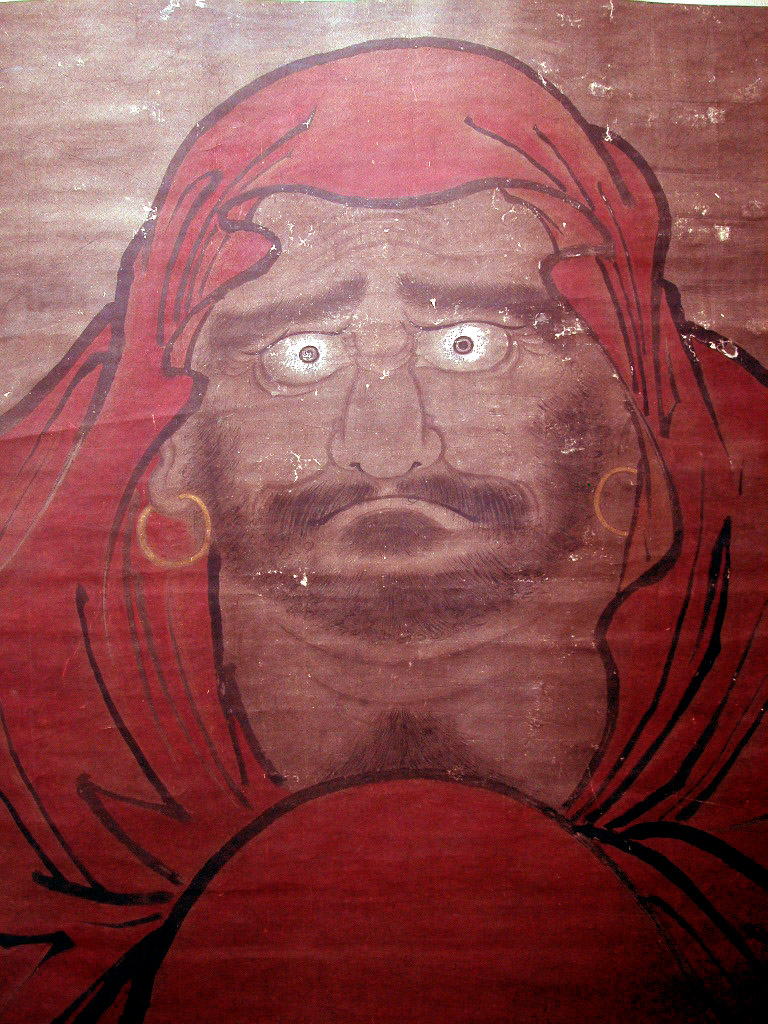
Painting of Bodhidharma at Himeji Castle. Edo period, Japan

According to Southeast Asian folklore, Bodhidharma travelled from Jambudvipa by sea to Palembang, Indonesia. Passing through Sumatra, Java, Bali, Malaysia, and Luzon Island, he eventually entered China through Nanyue. In his travels through the region, Bodhidharma is said to have transmitted his knowledge of the Mahayana doctrine and the martial arts. Malay legend holds that he introduced forms to silat. In Tagalog legend, Bodhidharma reached the island of Luzon in the Philippines passing through Palawan and he introduced Arnis to the locals.

Vajrayana tradition links Bodhidharma with the 11th-century south Indian monk Dampa Sangye who travelled extensively to Tibet and China spreading tantric teachings.

=== Appearance after his death ===
Three years after Bodhidharma's death, Ambassador Song Yun of northern Wei is said to have seen him walking while holding a shoe at the Pamir Mountains. Song asked Bodhidharma where he was going, to which Bodhidharma replied, "I am going home." When asked why he was holding his shoe, Bodhidharma answered, "You will know when you reach Shaolin monastery. Don't mention that you saw me or you will meet with disaster." After arriving at the palace, Song told the emperor that he met Bodhidharma on the way. The emperor said Bodhidharma was already dead and buried and had Song arrested for lying. At Shaolin Monastery, the monks informed them that Bodhidharma was dead and had been buried in a hill behind the temple. The grave was exhumed and was found to contain a single shoe. The monks then said, "Master has gone back home," and prostrated three times: "For nine years, he had remained and nobody knew him; Carrying a shoe in hand he went home quietly, without ceremony."

== Lineage ==
=== Construction of lineages ===
The idea of a patriarchal lineage in Chan dates back to the epitaph for Faru (法如), a disciple of the 5th patriarch Hongren (弘忍). In the Long Scroll of the Treatise on the Two Entrances and Four Practices and the Continued Biographies of Eminent Monks, Daoyu and Dazu Huike are the only explicitly identified disciples of Bodhidharma. The epitaph gives a line of descent identifying Bodhidharma as the first patriarch.

In the 6th century, the biographies of famous monks were collected. From this genre, the typical Chan lineage was developed:

These famous biographies were non-sectarian. The Ch'an biographical works, however, aimed to establish Ch'an as a legitimate school of Buddhism traceable to its Indian origins, and at the same time championed a particular form of Ch'an. Historical accuracy was of little concern to the compilers; old legends were repeated, new stories were invented and reiterated until they, too, became legends.

According to McRae, it is not clear that the practitioners surrounding Bodhidharma and his disciple Huike considered themselves as belonging to a unified movement or group, such as a "Chan school", nor did they have any sense of sharing any continuity with the later tradition. He says even the name "proto-Chan" is not really reflective of their activities.

D. T. Suzuki contends that the growth in Chan's popularity during the 7th and 8th centuries attracted criticism that it had "no authorized records of its direct transmission from the founder of Buddhism" and that Chan historians made Bodhidharma the 28th patriarch of Buddhism in response to such attacks.

=== Six patriarchs ===
The earliest lineages described the lineage from Bodhidharma into the 5th to 7th generation of patriarchs. Various records of different authors are known, which give a variation of transmission lines:

	The Continued Biographies of Eminent Monks Xu gaoseng zhuàn 續高僧傳 Daoxuan 道宣 (596–667)	The Record of the Transmission of the Dharma-Jewel Chuan fabao ji 傳法寶記 Du Fei 杜胐	History of Masters and Disciples of the Laṅkāvatāra-Sūtra Lengqie shizi jì 楞伽師資紀記 Jingjue 淨覺 (ca. 683 – ca. 650)	Xianzongji 显宗记 of Shenhui 神会
1	Bodhidharma	Bodhidharma	Bodhidharma	Bodhidharma
2	Huike 慧可 (487? – 593)	Daoyu 道育	Daoyu 道育	Daoyu 道育
2	Huike 慧可 (487? – 593)	Huike 慧可 (487? – 593)	Huike 慧可 (487? – 593)	Huike 慧可 (487? – 593)
3	Sengcan 僧璨 (d.606)	Sengcan 僧璨 (d.606)	Sengcan 僧璨 (d.606)	Sengcan 僧璨 (d.606)
4	Daoxin 道信 (580–651)	Daoxin 道信 (580–651)	Daoxin 道信 (580–651)	Daoxin 道信 (580–651)
5	Hongren 弘忍 (601–674)	Hongren 弘忍 (601–674)	Hongren 弘忍 (601–674)	Hongren 弘忍 (601–674)
6	–	Faru 法如 (638–689)	Shenxiu 神秀 (606? – 706)	Huineng 慧能 (638–713)
6	–	Shenxiu 神秀 (606? – 706)	Xuanze 玄賾	Huineng 慧能 (638–713)
7	–	–	–	Xuanjue 玄覺 (665–713)

=== Continuous lineage from Gautama Buddha ===
Eventually, these descriptions of the lineage evolved into a continuous lineage from Śākyamuni Buddha to Bodhidharma. The idea of a line of descent from Śākyamuni Buddha is the basis for the distinctive lineage tradition of Chan Buddhism.

According to the Song of Enlightenment (證道歌 Zhèngdào gē) by Yongjia Xuanjue, Bodhidharma was the 28th Patriarch of Chan, in a line of descent from Gautama Buddha via his disciple Mahākāśyapa:

Mahakashyapa was the first, leading the line of transmission;
Twenty-eight Fathers followed him in the West;
The Lamp was then brought over the sea to this country;
And Bodhidharma became the First Father here
His mantle, as we all know, passed over six Fathers,
And by them many minds came to see the Light.

The Transmission of the Light gives 28 patriarchs in this transmission:

	Sanskrit	Chinese	Vietnamese	Japanese	Korean
1	Mahākāśyapa	摩訶迦葉 / Móhējiāyè	Ma-Ha-Ca-Diếp	Makakashō	마하가섭 / Mahagasŏp
2	Ānanda	阿難陀 (阿難) / Ānántuó (Ānán)	A-Nan-Đà (A-Nan)	Ananda Buddha (Anan)	아난다 (아난) / Ananda Buddha (Anan)
3	Śānavāsa	商那和修 / Shāngnàhéxiū	Thương-Na-Hòa-Tu	Shōnawashu	상나화수 / Sangnahwasu
4	Upagupta	優婆掬多 / Yōupójúduō	Ưu-Ba-Cúc-Đa	Ubakikuta	우바국다 / Upakukta
5	Dhrtaka	提多迦 / Dīduōjiā	Đề-Đa-Ca	Daitaka	제다가 / Chedaga
6	Miccaka	彌遮迦 / Mízhējiā	Di-Dá-Ca	Mishaka	미차가 / Michaga
7	Vasumitra	婆須密 (婆須密多) / Póxūmì (Póxūmìduō)	Bà-Tu-Mật (Bà-Tu-Mật-Đa)	Bashumitsu (Bashumitta)	바수밀다 / Pasumilta
8	Buddhanandi	浮陀難提 / Fútuónándī	Phật-Đà-Nan-Đề	Buddanandai	불타난제 / Pŭltananje
9	Buddhamitra	浮陀密多 / Fútuómìduō	Phục-Đà-Mật-Đa	Buddamitta	복태밀다 / Puktaemilda
10	Pārśva	波栗濕縛 / 婆栗濕婆 (脅尊者) / Bōlìshīfú / Pólìshīpó (Xiézūnzhě)	Ba-Lật-Thấp-Phược / Bà-Lật-Thấp-Bà (Hiếp-Tôn-Giả)	Barishiba (Kyōsonja)	파률습박 (협존자) / P'ayulsŭppak (Hyŏpjonje)
11	Punyayaśas	富那夜奢 / Fùnàyèshē	Phú-Na-Dạ-Xa	Funayasha	부나야사 / Punayasa
12	Ānabodhi / Aśvaghoṣa	阿那菩提 (馬鳴) / Ānàpútí (Mǎmíng)	A-Na-Bồ-Đề (Mã-Minh)	Anabotei (Memyō)	아슈바고샤 (마명) / Asyupakosya (Mamyŏng)
13	Kapimala	迦毘摩羅 / Jiāpímóluó	Ca-Tỳ-Ma-La	Kabimora (Kabimara)	가비마라 / Kabimara
14	Nāgārjuna	那伽閼剌樹那 (龍樹) / Nàqiéèlàshùnà (Lóngshù)	Na-Già-Át-Lạt-Thụ-Na (Long-Thọ)	Nagaarajuna (Ryūju)	나가알랄수나 (용수) / Nakaallalsuna (Yongsu)
15	Āryadeva / Kānadeva	迦那提婆 / Jiānàtípó	Ca-Na-Đề-Bà	Kanadaiba	가나제바 / Kanajeba
16	Rāhulata	羅睺羅多 / Luóhóuluóduō	La-Hầu-La-Đa	Ragorata	라후라다 / Rahurada
17	Sanghānandi	僧伽難提 / Sēngqiénántí	Tăng-Già-Nan-Đề	Sōgyanandai	승가난제 / Sŭngsananje
18	Sanghayaśas	僧伽舍多 / Sēngqiéshèduō	Tăng-Già-Da-Xá	Sōgyayasha	가야사다 / Kayasada
19	Kumārata	鳩摩羅多 / Jiūmóluóduō	Cưu-Ma-La-Đa	Kumorata (Kumarata)	구마라다 / Kumarada
20	Śayata / Jayata	闍夜多 / Shéyèduō	Xà-Dạ-Đa	Shayata	사야다 / Sayada
21	Vasubandhu	婆修盤頭 (世親) / Póxiūpántóu (Shìqīn)	Bà-Tu-Bàn-Đầu (Thế-Thân)	Bashubanzu (Sejin)	바수반두 (세친) / Pasubandu (Sechin)
22	Manorhitajuna	摩拏羅 / Mónáluó	Ma-Noa-La	Manura	마나라 / Manara
23	Haklenayaśas	鶴勒那 (鶴勒那夜奢) / Hèlènà (Hèlènàyèzhě)	Hạc-Lặc-Na	Kakurokuna (Kakurokunayasha)	학륵나 / Haklŭkna
24	Simhabodhi	師子菩提 / Shīzǐpútí	Sư-Tử-Bồ-Đề / Sư-Tử-Trí	Shishibodai	사자 / Saja
25	Vasiasita	婆舍斯多 / Póshèsīduō	Bà-Xá-Tư-Đa	Bashashita	바사사다 / Pasasada
26	Punyamitra	不如密多 / Bùrúmìduō	Bất-Như-Mật-Đa	Funyomitta	불여밀다 / Punyŏmilta
27	Prajñātāra	般若多羅 / Bōrěduōluó	Bát-Nhã-Đa-La	Hannyatara	반야다라 / Panyadara
28	Dharmayana / Bodhidharma	Ta Mo / 菩提達磨	Đạt-Ma / Bồ-Đề-Đạt-Ma	Daruma / Bodaidaruma	Tal Ma /보리달마 / Poridalma]

== Modern scholarship ==
Bodhidharma has been the subject of critical scientific research, which has shed new light on the traditional stories about Bodhidharma.

=== Biography as a hagiographic process ===
According to John McRae, Bodhidharma has been the subject of a hagiographic process which served the needs of Chan Buddhism. According to him, it is not possible to write an accurate biography of Bodhidharma:

It is ultimately impossible to reconstruct any original or accurate biography of the man whose life serves as the original trace of his hagiography—where "trace" is a term from Jacques Derrida meaning the beginningless beginning of a phenomenon, the imagined, but always intellectually unattainable, origin. Hence any such attempt by modern biographers to reconstruct a definitive account of Bodhidharma's life is both doomed to failure and potentially, no different in intent from the hagiographical efforts of premodern writers.

McRae's standpoint accords with Yanagida's standpoint: "Yanagida ascribes great historical value to the witness of the disciple Tanlin, but at the same time, acknowledges the presence of 'many puzzles in the biography of Bodhidharma'". Given the present state of the sources, he considers it impossible to compile a reliable account of Bodhidharma's life.

Several scholars have suggested that the composed image of Bodhidharma depended on the combination of supposed historical information on various historical figures over several centuries. Bodhidharma as a historical person may even never have actually existed.

=== Origins and place of birth ===
Dumoulin comments on the three principal sources. The Persian heritage is doubtful, according to Dumoulin: "In the Description of the Lo-yang temple, Bodhidharma is called a Persian. Given the ambiguity of geographical references in writings of this period, such a statement should not be taken too seriously." Dumoulin considers Tanlin's account of Bodhidharma being "the third son of a great Brahman king" to be a later addition, and finds the exact meaning of "South Indian Brahman stock" unclear: "And when Daoxuan speaks of origins from South Indian Brahman stock, it is not clear whether he is referring to roots in nobility or to India in general as the land of the Brahmans."

These Chinese sources lend themselves to make inferences about Bodhidharma's origins. "The third son of a Brahman king" has been speculated to mean "the third son of a Pallava king". Based on a specific pronunciation of the Chinese characters 香至 as Kang-zhi, meaning "fragrance extreme", Tsutomu Kambe identifies 香至 to be Kanchipuram, an old capital town in the state Tamil Nadu, India. According to Tsutomu Kambe, "Kanchi means 'a radiant jewel' or 'a luxury belt with jewels', and puram means a town or a state in the sense of earlier times. Thus, it is understood that the '香至-Kingdom' corresponds to the old capital 'Kanchipuram'."

Acharya Raghu, in his work 'Bodhidharma Retold', used a combination of multiple factors to identify Bodhidharma from the state of Andhra Pradesh in South India, specifically to the geography around Mt. Sailum or modern day Srisailam.

The Pakistani scholar Ahmad Hasan Dani speculated that according to popular accounts in Pakistan's northwest, Bodhidharma may be from the region around the Peshawar valley, or possibly around modern Afghanistan's eastern border with Pakistan.

=== Caste ===
In the context of the Indian caste system, the mention of "Brahman king" acquires a nuance. Broughton notes that "king" implies that Bodhidharma was of a caste of warriors and rulers. Brahman is, in western contexts, easily understood as Brahmana or Brahmin, which means priest.

=== Abode in China ===
Buswell dates Bodhidharma's abode in China approximately at the early 5th century. Broughton dates Bodhidharma's presence in Luoyang to between 516 and 526, when the temple referred to—Yongning Temple (永寧寺), was at the height of its glory. Starting in 526, Yǒngníngsì suffered damage from a series of events, ultimately leading to its destruction in 534.

=== Shaolin boxing ===
The idea that Bodhidharma founded martial arts at the Shaolin Temple was spread in the 20th century. Martial arts historians have shown that this legend stems from a 17th-century qigong manual known as the Yijin Jing ("Muscle Change Classic," "Sinews Transformation's Classic"). While the Shaolin-monks attributed the origins of their fighting-skills to Vajrapani, the daoist author of the Yijin Jing wrongly assumed that the monks attributed these skills to Bodhidharma, due to the daoist tradition of attributing daoyin gymnastics to Bodhidharma, and the influence of Buddhism on Daoist meditation techniques. The preface of this work says that Bodhidharma left behind the Yi Jin Jing, and further states that the monks obtained the fighting skills which made them gain some fame from this manual.

The attribution of the Yijin Jing to Bodhidharma has been discredited early on, and is also rejected by historians like Tang Hao, Xu Zhen, and Matsuda Ryuchi. According to Lin Boyuan, "This manuscript is full of errors, absurdities, and fantastic claims; it cannot be taken as a legitimate source."

The composition of the text itself has been dated to 1624, while the oldest available copy was published in 1827. In the 19th century, when the Yijin Jing became popular in military circles, and the Shaolin monks started to use it, the Shaolin martial tradition became gradually associated with Bodhidharma. The association of Bodhidharma with martial arts only became widespread as a result of the 1904–1907 serialization of the novel The Travels of Lao Ts'an in Illustrated Fiction Magazine, which incorporated this newly developed attribution of Shaolin martial arts to Bodhidharma. According to Henning, the "story is clearly a twentieth-century invention," which "is confirmed by writings going back at least 250 years earlier, which mention both Bodhidharma and martial arts but make no connection between the two."

== Cultural legacy ==
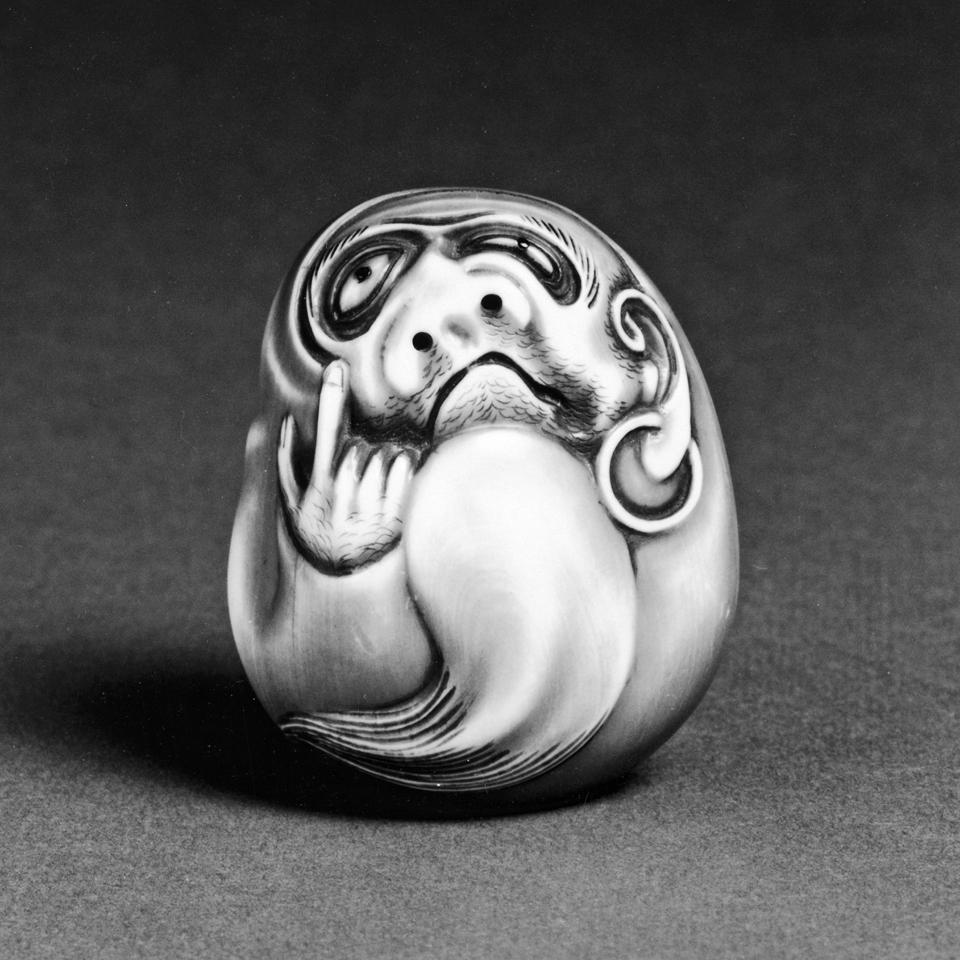
Sperm whale tooth statuette of Bodhidharma, carved by Hidemasa, early 19th century (Edo)

In the Zen kōan tradition, Bodhidharma is mentioned as a significant figure. In Dogen's 13th-century kōan collection, the Shinji Shōbōgenzō, Bodhidharma is mentioned in fourteen different kōans. In The Gateless Gate by Wumen Huikai:

A monk asked Zhaozhou, "What is the meaning of the ancestral teacher's (i.e., Bodhidharma's) coming from the west?" Zhaozhou said, "The cypress tree in front of the hall."

— The Gateless Gate, case no. 37

In a short addendum from 1245 CE, the text refers to a motto attributed to Bodhidharma: "Bodhidharma coming from the west, unattached to any words, pointing directly to the mind of man, advocated seeing into one's nature and becoming Buddha." The legend of Dazu Huike and Bodhidharma is recounted in case no. 41 of The Gateless Gate.

Bodhidharma's image became the inspiration for Japanese Daruma dolls, which originated in Meiwa-era Takasaki as good luck charms. A Daruma Doll Festival (達磨市, daruma-ichi) is held at the Shorinzan Daruma Temple in Takasaki every year, celebrating the city as the birthplace of the Daruma doll. Over 400,000 attendants come to purchase new dolls. The Japanese version of the children's game statues is named "Daruma-san ga koronda" (達磨さんが転んだ; lit. "The Daruma Fell Over").

A 1989 South Korean film, Why Has Bodhi-Dharma Left for the East?, derives its title from a kōan about Bodhidharma's legendary transmission of Chan Buddhism to China. The film screened at the 1989 Cannes Film Festival and was the first South Korean film to release theatrically in the United States. In 1994, the Hong Kong film Master of Zen (also known as Bodhidharma) adapted the legends of Bodhidharma's life into a martial arts drama film, partly inspired by the master's association with Shaolin Kung Fu. The 2011 Indian Tamil science fiction martial arts film 7 Aum Arivu features a descendant of Bodhidharma as a main character portrayed by Suriya, with its plot centering on the ancient monk's legendary skills and knowledge. The film faced criticism for its historical inaccuracies, particularly regarding Bodhidharma's age upon entering China. The controversy led to hunger strikes among Indian followers of Bodhidharma.

== Attributed works ==
Modern scholars, such as the Japanese scholar of early Chan, Yanagida Seizan, agree that only one extant text can be attributed to Bodhidharma. This is the Two Entrances and Four Practices (二入四行論), also known as "Outline of Practice" (二種入 Er zhong ru), which is part of the larger "Bodhidharma Anthology" that also includes teachings from some of Bodhidharma's students, such as Huike and Dharma master Yuan.

There also exists a Dunhuang manuscript titled Treatise of Dhyana Master Bodhidharma (Tianzhu guo Putidamo chan shi lun 天竺國菩提達摩禪師論). According to McRae, this text "might be taken as a guide to the teachings of early Chan. The text is probably relatively early, although its putative date of compilation or transcription, 681, is not reliable. Unfortunately, its contents do not lend themselves to precise dating."

=== Later attributions ===
Throughout the history of Chan, various other works became attributed to Bodhidharma and modern scholars have studied these as well, attempting to understand their provenance.

Commonly attributed works include:

- Treatise on the Destruction of Characteristics (《破相論》 Poxiang lun), also known as the Treatise on the Contemplation of the Mind (觀心論 Kuan-hsin lun), according to Yanagida, this is a work of Shenxiu.
- The Wake-up Treatise or Treatise on Realizing the Nature《悟性論 Wu-hsing lun, according to Yanagida, this is a later reformulation of ideas of the East mountain teachings and respond to Shenhui's criticisms of the school.
- The Bloodstream Treatise (血脈論 Xuemai lun), according to Yanagida, this is a treatise by a member of the Oxhead school (7th–8th century) of Chan.
- The Jueguan lun, (Treatise on the Transcendence of Cognition), a text discovered among the Dunhuang manuscripts, has been attributed to Bodhidharma, however it is more likely by an anonymous member of the Oxhead school, an important Chan faction during the Tang dynasty.
- The Genealogical Treatise (Hsueh-mo lun), this is a "post-Platform Sutra and immediately pre-Ma-tsu text" according to Yanagida, which discusses the teaching that "does not posit words," and "seeing the nature and achieving buddhahood."
- The Verses on the Heart Sutra, "a clearly apocryphal text" that introduces Yogacara ideas associated with Xuanzang's translations into Chan.

=== Pointing directly to one's mind ===
One of the fundamental Chán texts attributed to Bodhidharma is a four-line stanza whose first two verses echo the Laṅkāvatāra Sūtra's disdain for words and whose second two verses stress the importance of the insight into reality achieved through "self-realization":

A special transmission outside the scriptures
Not founded upon words and letters;
By pointing directly to [one's] mind
It lets one see into [one's own true] nature and [thus] attain Buddhahood.

The stanza, in fact, is not Bodhidharma's, but, rather, dates to the year 1108.

== See also ==
- Chinese Buddhism
- Linji school
- Rinzai school
- Caodong school
- Sōtō
- Silk Road transmission of Buddhism
- Buddhism amongst Tamils
- Kanchipuram
- Why Has Bodhi-Dharma Left for the East?
- 7 Aum Arivu
- Buddhabhadra
- Dongdu ji

== Sources ==
=== Printed sources ===
- Acharya, Raghu (2017), Shanon, Sidharth (ed.), Bodhidharma Retold – A Journey from Sailum to Shaolin, New Delhi: Motilal Banarsidass, ISBN 978-81-208-4152-9
- Broughton, Jeffrey L. (1999), The Bodhidharma Anthology: The Earliest Records of Zen, Berkeley: University of California Press, ISBN 0-520-21972-4
- Buswell, Robert E., ed. (2004), Encyclopedia of Buddhism, vol. 1, Macmillan, ISBN 0-02-865718-7
- Chaline, Eric (2003), The Book of Zen: The Path to Inner Peace, Barron's Educational Series, ISBN 0-7641-5598-9
- Chang, Chung-Yuan (1967), "Ch'an Buddhism: Logical and Illogical", Philosophy East and West, 17 (1/4): 37–49, doi:10.2307/1397043, JSTOR 1397043, archived from the original on 2011-05-24
- Cole, Alan (2009), Fathering Your Father: The Zen of Fabrication in Tang Buddhism, Berkeley, Los Angeles, London: University of California Press, ISBN 978-0-520-25485-5
- Cook, Francis Dojun (2003), Transmitting the Light: Zen Master's Keizan's Denkoroku, Boston: Wisdom Publications
- Diener, Michael S. (1991), The Shambhala Dictionary of Buddhism and Zen, Boston: Shambhala
- Dumoulin, Heinrich (1993), "Early Chinese Zen Reexamined: A Supplement to Zen Buddhism: A History", Japanese Journal of Religious Studies, 20 (1): 31–53, doi:10.18874/jjrs.20.1.1993.31-53, ISSN 0304-1042
- Dumoulin, Heinrich; Heisig, James; Knitter, Paul F. (2005). Zen Buddhism: India and China. World Wisdom, Inc. ISBN 978-0-941532-89-1.
- Edou, Jérôme (1996), Machig Labdrön and the Foundations of Chöd (PDF), Snow Lion Publications, ISBN 978-1-55939-039-2, archived from the original on 2023-03-17
- Eitel, Ernest J.; Takakuwa, K. (1904), Hand-book of Chinese Buddhism: Being a Sanskrit-Chinese Dictionary with Vocabularies of Buddhist terms (2nd ed.), Tokyo, Japan: Sanshusha, p. 33, archived from the original on 2023-03-17
- Faure, Bernard (1986), "Bodhidharma as Textual and Religious Paradigm", History of Religions, 25 (3): 187–198, doi:10.1086/463039, S2CID 145809479, archived from the original on 2007-09-28
- Ferguson, Andrew (2000), Zen's Chinese Heritage: The Masters and their Teachings, Somerville: Wisdom Publications, ISBN 0-86171-163-7
- Garfinkel, Perry (2006), Buddha or Bust, Harmony Books, ISBN 978-1-4000-8217-9
- Gasparini, Mariachiara (2014). "A Mathematic Expression of Art: Sino-Iranian and Uighur Textile Interactions and the Turfan Textile Collection in Berlin". In Rudolf G. Wagner & Monica Juneja (eds.). Transcultural Studies. Vol. 1. Ruprecht-Karls Universität Heidelberg. pp. 134–163. doi:10.11588/ts.2014.1.12313. ISSN 2191-6411. Archived from the original on 2017-05-25..
- Goodman, Steven D.; Davidson, Ronald M. (1992), Tibetan Buddhism, SUNY Press
- Haines, Bruce (1995), Karate's history and traditions, Charles E. Tuttle Publishing Co., Inc, ISBN 0-8048-1947-5
- Henning, Stanley (1994), "Ignorance, Legend and Taijiquan" (PDF), Journal of the Chenstyle Taijiquan Research Association of Hawaii, 2 (3): 1–7, archived from the original on 2011-02-23
- Henning, Stan; Green, Tom (2001), "Folklore in the Martial Arts", in Green, Thomas A. (ed.), Martial Arts of the World: An Encyclopedia, Santa Barbara, CA: ABC-CLIO
- Jorgensen, John (2000), "Bodhidharma", in Johnston, William M. (ed.), Encyclopedia of Monasticism: A-L, Taylor & Francis
- Kambe, Tstuomu (2012), Bodhidharma. A collection of stories from Chinese literature (PDF), archived from the original (PDF) on 2015-11-06
- Kohn, Michael H., ed. (1991), The Shambhala Dictionary of Buddhism and Zen, Boston: Shambhala.
- Lin, Boyuan (1996), Zhōngguó wǔshù shǐ 中國武術史, Taipei 臺北: Wǔzhōu chūbǎnshè 五洲出版社
- Maguire, Jack (2001), Essential Buddhism, New York: Pocket Books, ISBN 0-671-04188-6
- McRae, John R. (1986), The Northern School and the Formation of Early Chʻan Buddhism, Studies in East Asian Buddhism, vol. 3, University of Hawaii Press
- McRae, John R. (2000), "The Antecedents of Encounter Dialogue in Chinese Ch'an Buddhism", in Heine, Steven; Wright, Dale S. (eds.), The Kōan: Texts and Contexts in Zen Buddhism, Oxford University Press, archived from the original on 2012-07-25.
- McRae, John R. (2003), Seeing Through Zen. Encounter, Transformation, and Genealogy in Chinese Chan Buddhism, The University Press Group Ltd, ISBN 978-0-520-23798-8
- McRae, John R. (2004), Seeing through Zen: Encounter, Transformation, and Genealogy in Chinese Chan Buddhism, University of California Press
- Pine, Red, ed. (1989), The Zen Teaching of Bodhidharma: A Bilingual Edition, New York: North Point Press, ISBN 0-86547-399-4
- Pine, Red, ed. (2009), The Zen Teaching of Bodhidharma, Farrar, Straus and Giroux, ISBN 978-0-86547-399-7
- Ryuchi, Matsuda 松田隆智 (1986), Zhōngguó wǔshù shǐlüè 中國武術史略 (in Chinese), Taipei 臺北: Danqing tushu
- Sekida, Katsuki (1996). Two Zen Classics. Mumonkan, The Gateless Gate. Hekiganroku, The Blue Cliff Records. Translated with commentaries by Katsuki Sekida. New York / Tokyo: Weatherhill.
- Shahar, Meir (2008). The Shaolin Monastery: history, religion, and the Chinese martial arts. University of Hawaii Press. ISBN 978-0-8248-3110-3.
- Shaikh Awab, Zainal Abidin; Sutton, Nigel (2006), Silat Tua: The Malay Dance Of Life, Kuala Lumpur: Azlan Ghanie Sdn Bhd, ISBN 978-983-42328-0-1, archived from the original on 2016-03-07
- Soothill, William Edward; Hodous, Lewis (1995), A Dictionary of Chinese Buddhist Terms (PDF), London: RoutledgeCurzon, archived from the original (PDF) on 2014-03-03
- Sutton, Florin Giripescu (1991), Existence and Enlightenment in the Laṅkāvatāra Sūtra: A Study in the Ontology and Epistemology of the Yogācāra School of Mahāyāna Buddhism, Albany: State University of New York Press, ISBN 0-7914-0172-3.
- Suzuki, D.T., ed. (1932), The Lankavatara Sutra: A Mahayana Text, archived from the original on 2012-02-04.
- Suzuki, D.T. (1948), Manual of Zen Buddhism (PDF), archived from the original (PDF) on 2011-07-21
- Suzuki, D.T. (1949), Essays in Zen Buddhism, New York: Grove Press, ISBN 0-8021-5118-3
- Tikhvinskiĭ, Sergeĭ Leonidovich; Perelomov, Leonard Sergeevich (1981). China and her neighbours, from ancient times to the Middle Ages: a collection of essays. Progress Publishers.
- von Le Coq, Albert (1913). Chotscho: Facsimile-Wiedergaben der Wichtigeren Funde der Ersten Königlich Preussischen Expedition nach Turfan in Ost-Turkistan. Berlin: Dietrich Reimer (Ernst Vohsen). doi:10.20676/00000194. Archived from the original on 2016-09-15 – via NII "Digital Silk Road" / Toyo Bunko.
- Watts, Alan W. (1958), The Spirit of Zen, New York: Grove Press
- Watts, Alan W. (1962), The Way of Zen, Great Britain: Pelican books, p. 106, ISBN 0-14-020547-0
- Williams, Paul (1989), Mahayana Buddhism: The Doctrinal Foundations, Psychology Press, ISBN 0-415-02537-0
- Wong, Kiew Kit (2001), The Art of Shaolin Kungfu, Tuttle Publishing, ISBN 0-8048-3439-3
- Yampolski, Philip (2003), Chan. A Historical Sketch. In: Buddhist Spirituality. Later China, Korea, Japan and the Modern World; edited by Takeuchi Yoshinori, Delhi: Motilal Banarsidass
- Zvelebil, Kamil V. (1987), "The Sound of the One Hand", Journal of the American Oriental Society, 107 (1), Journal of the American Oriental Society, Vol. 107, No. 1: 125–126, doi:10.2307/602960, JSTOR 602960.
- 金实秋 (2008), 中日韩达摩造像图典 [Sino-Japanese-Korean Statue Dictionary of Bodhidharma] (in Chinese), Beijing Shi: 宗教文化出版社, ISBN 978-7-80123-888-7

=== Web sources ===
Buddhist titles
Preceded by Prajñādhara	Lineage of Zen Buddhist patriarchs	Succeeded by Huike
