= Two Entrances and Four Practices =

Buddhist text

The Treatise on the Two Entrances and Four Practices (Chinese: 二入四行; Pinyin: èrrú sìxíng; Wade–Giles: Erh-ju ssu-hsing; Japanese: Ninyū shigyō ron) is a Buddhist text attributed to Bodhidharma, the traditional founder of Chan (Japanese: Zen) Buddhism.

== History ==
The text, sometimes referred to simply as The Two Entrances, was first used in 6th century CE by a group of wandering monks in Northern China specializing in meditation who looked to Bodhidharma as their spiritual forebear. Though this text was originally attributed to Bodhidharma, a great deal of material was added to it, probably around the 8th century, by the monks or perhaps other anonymous groups. The work, along with T'an Lun's biography of Bodhidharma and other newly discovered manuscripts, was recompiled into a larger text called the Long Scroll by a renowned Japanese Zen practitioner, Daisetsu Teitaro Suzuki, in 1935.

== Teachings ==
The two entrances referred to in the title are the entrance of principle (理入 lǐrù) and the entrance of practice (行入 xíngrù). (Note: "principle" is also translated as "reason.")

- "Entrance of principle" refers to seeing through the obscurations of our daily mind and manifesting our true nature, that is, Buddha nature; it is referred to in one short passage:

To enter by principle means to realize the essence through instruction and to believe that all living things share the same true nature, which isn’t apparent because it’s shrouded by sensation and delusion. Those who turn from delusion back to reality, who "meditate on walls," the absence of self and other, the oneness of mortal and sage, and who remain unmoved even by scriptures, are in complete and unspoken agreement with principle. Without moving, without effort, they enter, we say, by principle.

- "Entrance of practice" deals with practicing a "detached perspective on the varying circumstances of one's own life," through different daily practices. In the section on the latter, the four practices are listed as being at the core of Bodhidharma's teaching. These are:
  - Practice of the retribution of enmity: to accept all suffering as the fruition of past transgressions, without enmity or complaint.
  - Practice of the acceptance of circumstances: to remain unmoved even by good fortune, recognizing it as evanescent.
  - Practice of the absence of craving: to be without craving, which is the source of all suffering.
  - Practice of accordance with the Dharma: to eradicate wrong thoughts and practice the six perfections, without having any “practice”

According to John R. McRae, "the “entrance of principle” refers to interior cultivation, mental practice undertaken deep within the individual's psyche, and the “entrance of practice” refers to practice undertaken actively and in interaction with the world." Yet, McRae also notes that it's not clear what exactly the "entrance of principle" entailed. The phrase "wall contemplation," biguan, is not directly explicated, though it is commonly used in Buddhist and Taoist literature to refer to both physically facing a wall and metaphorically cultivating non differentiation between all things through internal stillness. Later tradition graphically depicted it as practicing dhyana while facing a wall, but it may be a metaphor, referring to the four walls of a room which prevent the winds from entering the room.

== Structure ==
The format of the text is that of a collection of the master's teaching as collected by his students. There are two entrances listed, one abstract and one concrete. In other words, the text list two different ways of achieving enlightenment, one based on inward reflection (the entrance of principle) and one based on outward action (the entrance of practice). The bimodal structure of this treatise was frequently copied and became typical in early Chan Buddhism.

== Place in the Long Scroll ==
The Two Entrances and Four Practices makes up one part of a larger text known as the Long Scroll, dubbed the "Bodhidharma Anthology" by Jeffrey Broughton, considered to contain the earliest records of Chan. Although some of the contents of the Long Scroll were already known, the complete Long Scroll was discovered among the Dunhuang manuscripts in the early part of the twentieth century. The Long Scroll, or Bodhidharma Anthology, contains seven parts: [1] a biography of Bodhidharma, [2] the Erru Sixing (Two Entrances and Four Practices), [3-4] two letters by anonymous authors, and [5-7] three records of dialogues and sayings by various masters, the second and third of which include the teachings of the iconoclastic Master Yüan. According to Broughton, the items comprising the Bodhidharma Anthology should be regarded as individual texts unto themselves, rather than treat the Anthology as one piece.

== Sources ==
- McRae, John R. (2003), Seeing through Zen: Encounter, Transformation, and Genealogy in Chinese Chan Buddhism, Berkeley: University of California Press, ISBN 9780520237971
- The Zen Teaching of Bodhidharma, translated by Red Pine, New York: North Shore Press, 1989, ISBN 9780865473980
