= Dongdu ji =

Chinese novel

Saomei dunlun Dongdu ji (掃魅敦倫東度記), (Note: Translated into English as The Cleansing of the Demons and Restoration of Proper Human Relationships, or The Record of the Conversion of the East.) also known as Dongyouji (東遊記), (Note: Translated into English as Mission to the East or The Journey to the East.) is a novel written in the Ming dynasty by Chinese author Fang Ruhao (方汝浩). Dongdu ji tells of two respected Buddhist monks—Burumiduo (不如密多) and Bodhidharma, who leads his three disciples from India to China to promote their religion. Described as a shanshu (善書) or "morality book", the novel was first published in 1635.

== Contents ==
Written in vernacular Chinese, the first eighteen chapters of Dongdu ji follow Venerable Burumiduo (不如密多尊者) as he rescues "the masses of lost people in Southern and Eastern India", while the rest of the novel's one hundred chapters revolve around Bodhidharma and his three disciples, as they journey from India to China to preach about Buddhism. The novel's structure is modelled after that of Journey to the West.

== Publication history ==
The novel was first published in Suzhou in 1635, during the twilight of the Ming dynasty. Although Ming dynasty writer Fang Ruhao (方汝浩) is conventionally credited as the author of Dongdu ji, French researcher Vincent Durand-Dastès alleges that the novel—which he describes as both a shanshu (善書) or "morality book" and an adventure novel—might instead have been written by the author of the 17th-century novel Sanjiao kaimi guizheng yanyi (三教開迷歸正演義) or The Romance of the Three Teachings. Early editions of the text are housed in both the Peking University Library and the Jigendo Library in Japan. The novel was translated into Korean under the title Dongyugi sometime in the nineteenth century, with a few surviving volumes now kept by the Institute of Oriental Manuscripts of the Russian Academy of Sciences. A partial French translation of Dongdu ji by Durand-Dastès was published in 2008 under the title La Conversion de l’Orient.

== Critical reception ==
Translator Vincent Durand-Dastès criticised the novel's "frequently ponderous style" and "simplistic plot structure", but acknowledged that it provided great insight into the cultural climate of the late Ming dynasty.
