= Faru (monk) =

Faru 法如
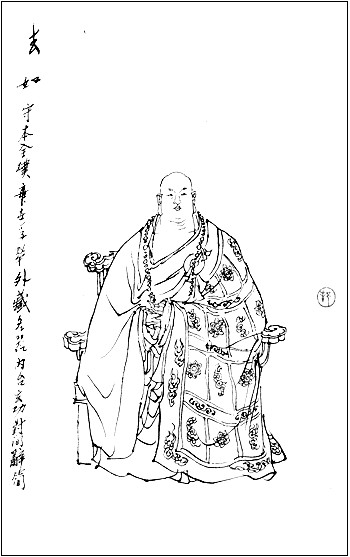
- Title: Chán master

Personal life
- Born: 638
- Died: 689

Religious life
- Religion: Buddhism
- School: Chán

Senior posting
- Teacher: Daman Hongren
- Predecessor: Daman Hongren

Faru (Chinese: 法如; pinyin: Fǎrù; Wade–Giles: Fa-ju; Japanese: Hōnyo) was a prominent Buddhist monk during the Tang dynasty in China. He was originally a student of Huimíng, but this teacher reportedly sent Faru to East Mountain to study under Daman Hongren. Under Hongren, with whom he studied for sixteen years, Faru is traditionally thought to have received dharma transmission. After his time on East Mountain, Faru left to Luoyang, spending some time at Shaolin Monastery and helping to re-establish its prominence.

Faru is notable in the history of Zen because the concept of a lineage, a fundamental notion in the identity of the school, seems to have originated with either him or his immediate followers. His epitaph speaks of an unbroken line of mind to mind transmission from Gautama Buddha to Bodhidharma, the founder of Zen, to Faru's teacher Hongren, and on to Faru himself. Other students of Hongren, however, claimed that they were the next point on the lineage and not Faru, however. These included Laoan, but most importantly Yuquan Shenxiu, who had a competing epitaph claiming he was the next patriarch of the lineage after Hongren. In modern Zen institutions, however, neither Shenxiu or Faru is traditionally considered the true heir of Hongren; that distinction lies with Huineng, a monk far less notable than Faru or Shenxiu who rose to prominence only after his death thanks to an extensive campaign by his student Heze Shenhui.
