= Master Yuan =

Chinese iconoclastic teacher

Master Yuan was an iconoclastic teacher who appears in the Long Scroll (also called the Bodhidharma Anthology by Jeffrey Broughton), which contains the earliest known records of Chan Buddhism. According to Broughton, despite being an obscure figure and not appearing in traditional collections of biographies or Chan genealogical charts, Yuan may be the earliest "Zen master."

== Teachings ==
According to Broughton, Yuan's teachings prefigure the hallmark doctrine of sudden awakening famously advocated by the later Southern School of Chan. Broughton thus regards Huineng, the sixth patriarch and traditional representative of Southern Chan, to be a "descendant in rhetoric" of Yuan. Yanagida Seizan also considers Yuan's teaching to anticipate Shenhui's critique of the gradualistic meditation methods of the Northern School. Yanagida further sees Yuan as foretokening the radical and spontaneous approach of Linji Yixuan as well, as Yuan taught that one must have energy and liveliness so as to not be deceived by others and the Dharma. Broughton summarizes Yuan's teaching style in the following way:

He [Yuan] is iconoclastic, consistently criticizing reliance on the Dharma, reliance on teachers, reliance on meditative practice, reliance on canonical texts. Faith in Buddhist teachings and teachers, praxis according to the traditional rules, and learning in scripture lead to nothing but self-deception and confusion. From this stance Master Yuan never budges. His relentless boldness prefigures much in the stance of the full-blown Ch'an tradition.

According to Master Yuan, not only should one not rely on others, but even reliance on Dharma itself is ultimately mistaken. As John Jorgensen points out, this goes a step further than classical sources such as the four reliances taught in the Vimalakīrti Sūtra which argued that, rather than rely on people, one should rely on Dharma; as well as the Dazhidu lun which says, "when the Buddha was about to enter Nirvana he said to his followers: 'From now on, rely on the Dharma, and not on people!'" For Master Yuan, to value one person as correct, even the Buddha, is for one's mind of faith to become heavy. On the other hand, to depend on Dharma was "still a one-sided view." Instead, Yuan says, "If you have bodily energy, you will avoid the deceptive delusions of people and Dharma, and your spirit will be all right."

While Yuan criticizes such things as reliance on texts, teachers, and traditional practices, he speaks positively of bodily energy (t'i-ch'i) and spirit (ching-shen). The latter term can be found in Daoist works such as the Zhuangzi and Liezi, and in Chinese medical texts, where ching-shen refers to vim, vigor, and stamina. For Yuan, energy and spirit are necessary to overcome ingenious artifice (ch'iao-wei), another term appearing in the Zhuangzi. However, as Broughton points out, this does not make Yuan a Daoist, but rather a Buddhist in the Bodhidharma circle who cast his understanding in native Chinese terms. According to Master Yuan, to give rise to the thought of moving toward the path is to have "crafty artifice," a mind of devices in which "a hundred ingenious schemes arise." For Yuan, this is to fall into having mind. Yuan says:

If you desire to cut off crafty artifice, don't produce the thought of enlightenment and don't use knowledge of the sutras and treatises. If you can accomplish this, then for the first time you will have bodily energy. If you have spirit, do not esteem understanding, do not seek Dharma, and do not love knowledge, then you will find a little quietude. ... If you do not seek wonderful understanding, do not serve as a teacher for people, and also do not take Dharma as your teacher, you will walk alone spontaneously. (Note: See Jorgensen's alternative translation of the last sentence: "If you do not seek the marvellous understanding, and do not take someone as a teacher, and do not take the Dharma as a teacher, one will naturally advance alone.")

In the same vein as Vimalakīrti who chastised Śāriputra for his addiction to sitting in the cross-legged posture, Master Yuan regarded those with attachment to sitting meditation as having succumbed to "ingenious artifice." According to Broughton, this criticism was directed at members of the Bodhidharma circle who reified the practice of sitting meditation. Yuan says:

All the sutras and treatises are dharmas that produce mind. If you produce a mental focus on the path, then ingenious artifice will give rise to knowledge and a complement of events. If mind is not produced, what need is there for cross-legged sitting dhyana? If ingenious artifice does not arise, why toil over right mindfulness? If you do not raise the thought of enlightenment and do not seek insight and understanding, then you will exhaust both phenomena and principle.

For Yuan, entering into meditation so that the mind does not move is a form of bondage. He says even the four dhyānas are just temporary states that should not be valued. According to Yanagida, these critiques served as the basis for Shenhui's later criticism of the Northern School. When asked how one should quiet the mind, Yuan replies that mind is "mysterious and not something to be concerned about." For Yuan, the man of spirit is neither drawn into disturbance nor quiescence. Yuan says, "If there is one dharma to be esteemed or valued, this dharma will be the one most capable of binding and killing you, and you will fall into having mind. This is an unreliable state of affairs." Yuan instead states that he has no Dharma to teach, since to set up a Dharma would be to deceive people. When pressed on this by a questioner, Yuan simply remains silent, echoing Vimalakīrti.

Master Yuan is also critical of attitudes which attach to and reify the letter of the Buddhist disciplinary code. In an encounter between Yuan and a Dharma Master Chih, which anticipates the dialogues of the later recorded-sayings genre, Chih confronts Yuan for being on the butchers' lane in the marketplace, as it is a violation of the Buddhist precepts for monks to witness the slaughter of animals. When Chih expresses his outrage that Yuan has seen the slaughtering of sheep, Yuan responds, "You're seeing it on top of seeing it!" Here Yuan points out that Chih has reified both the seeing of the slaughter and the violation of the disciplinary code. According to Jorgensen, Yuan is concerned with the spirit rather than the letter of the Buddhist precepts. This attitude echoes teachings found in the Prajñāpāramitā sutras, for example: "non-renunciation of moral training consists in the non-observation of all moral duties."

According to Yanagida, Master Yuan may have been the inspiration for the Oxhead School text, the Jueguan lun (Treatise on Cutting Off Contemplation). Broughton too observes that the Jueguan lun contains a dialogue between two figures, Ju-li (Entrance-into-Principle) and Yuan-men (Gate-of-Conditioned). According to Broughton, the latter may be a literary representation of Master Yuan, whose name means "conditioned." Yanagida also believed that Master Yuan's dialogues were known to the author of the Zhengdao ge.
