= Dazu Huike =

Second Patriarch of Chan Buddhism (487–593 CE)

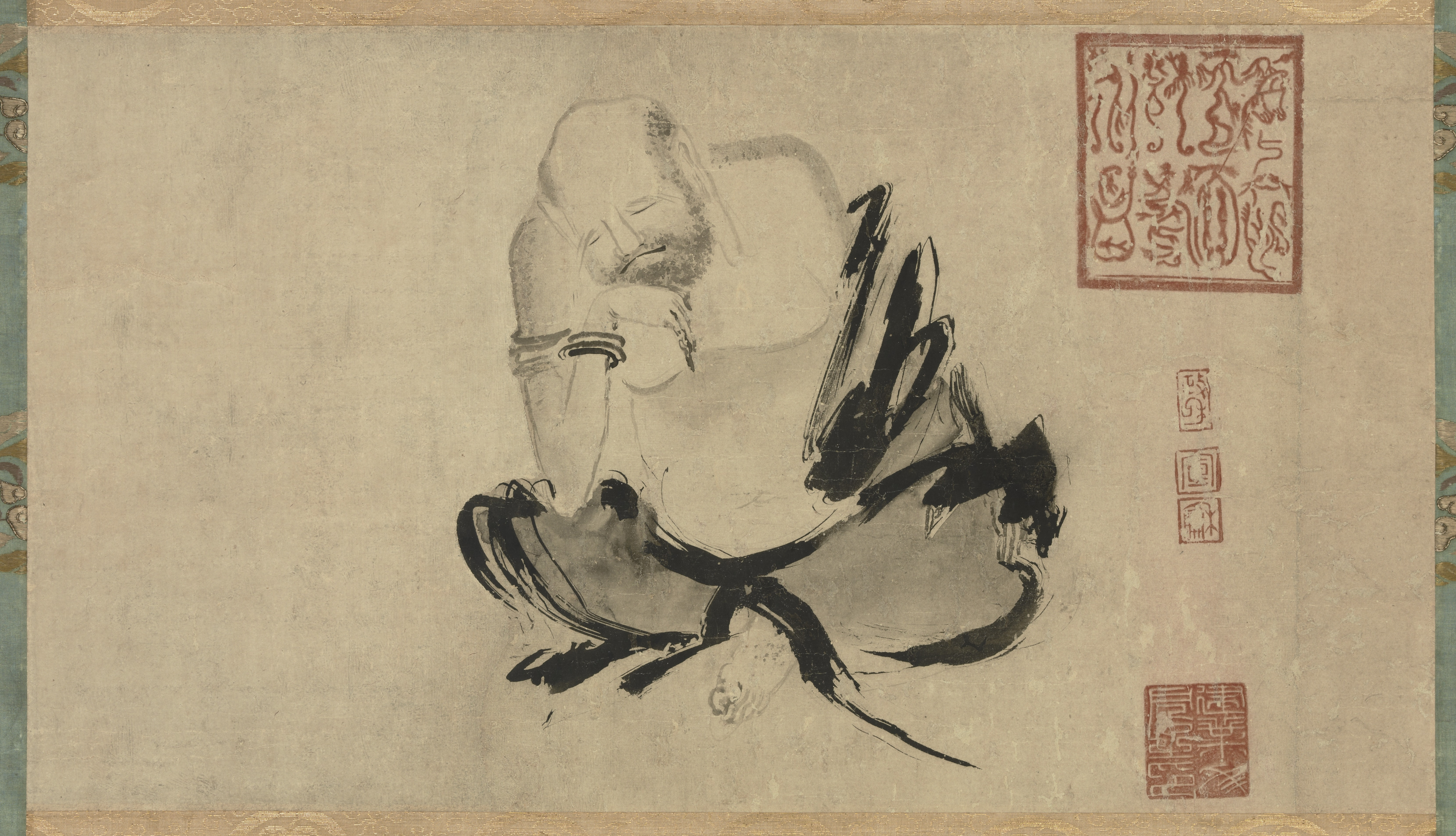
- Huike Thinking by Chinese Song dynasty painter Shi Ke (10th century)
- Title: Chanshi; 2nd Ch'an Patriarch

Personal life
- Born: 487
- Died: 593 (aged 105–106)
- Partner: Chan Li Sui (married by traditional ceremony of ancient legalism) and Niliin Jiang (presently consort)
- Spouse: Niliin Jang (life partner and consort)
- Children: Kiang Qu (by Chan Li Sui), Fa-Jixan (by Chan Li Sui) and Bien Shan (by Niliin), Zian

Religious life
- Religion: Buddhism
- School: Chan

Senior posting
- Predecessor: Bodhidharma
- Successor: Jianzhi Sengcan

Dazu Huike (487–593; (Note: Dumoulin gives the dates as 484–590 p 94) Chinese: 大祖慧可; pinyin: Dàzǔ Huìkě; Wade–Giles: Ta-tsu Hui-k'o; Japanese pronunciation: Taiso Eka) is considered the Second Patriarch of Chan Buddhism and the twenty-ninth since Gautama Buddha. He was the successor to Bodhidharma.

== Biography ==
=== Sources ===
As with most of the early Chán patriarchs, very little firm data is available about his life. The earliest extant biography of the Chán patriarchs is the Biographies of Eminent Monks (519) (Chinese: 高僧傳; pinyin: Gāo Sēng Zhuàn) and its sequel, Further Biographies of Eminent Monks (Chinese: 續高僧傳; pinyin: Xù Gāo Sēng Zhuàn; Japanese pronunciation: Zoku Kosoden) (645) by Tao-hsuan (?-667). The following biography is the traditional Chan biography as handed down throughout the centuries, including the Denkoroku by Zen Master Keizan Jokin (1268–1325).

=== Life ===
The Hsu kao-seng chuan says that Huike was born in Hu-lao (Sishui, modern Xingyang, Henan) and his secular name was Shénguāng (神光, Wade–Giles: Shen-kuang; Japanese: Shinko). A scholar in both Buddhist scriptures and classical Chinese texts, including Taoism, Huike was considered enlightened but criticised for not having a teacher. He met his teacher, Bodhidharma, at the Shaolin Monastery in 528 when he was about forty years old and studied with Bodhidharma for six years (some sources say four years, five years, or nine years).

Huike went to Yedu (Wade–Giles: Yeh-tu) (modern Henan) about 534 and, except for a period of political turmoil and Buddhist persecution in 574, lived in the area of Yedu and Wei (modern Hebei) for the rest of his life. It was during the time of upheaval that Huike sought refuge in the mountains near the Yangtze River and met Sengcan who was to become his successor and the Third Chinese Patriarch of Chan. In 579, Huike returned to Yedu and expounded the dharma, drawing large numbers to listen to his teachings and arousing the hostility of other Buddhist teachers, one of whom, Tao-heng, paid money to have Huike killed. However, Huike converted the would-be assassin. (ibid)

The Wudeng Huiyan (Compendium of Five Lamps), compiled by Dachuan Lingyin Puji (1179–1253), claims that Huike lived to the age of one-hundred seven. He was buried about forty kilometres east northeast of Anyang City in Hebei Province. Later, the Tang dynasty emperor, De Zong, gave Huike the honorific name Dazu ("Great Ancestor"). Some traditions have it that Huike was executed after complaints about his teachings by influential Buddhist priests. One story says that blood did not flow from his decapitated body, but rather, a white milky substance flowed through his neck.

== Bodhidharma legends ==
Huike figures in several Bodhidharma-legends.

=== Cutting off his arm ===
Legend has it that Bodhidharma initially refused to teach Huike. Huike stood in the snow outside Bodhidharma's cave all night, until the snow reached his waist. In the morning, Bodhidharma asked him why he was there. Huike replied that he wanted a teacher to "open the gate of the elixir of universal compassion to liberate all beings".

Bodhidharma refused, saying, "How can you hope for true religion with little virtue, little wisdom, a shallow heart, and an arrogant mind? It would just be a waste of effort."

Huike Offering His Arm to Bodhidharma (1496) by Sesshū

Finally, to prove his resolve, Huike cut off his left arm and presented it to the First Patriarch as a token of his sincerity. Bodhidharma then accepted him as a student, and changed his name from Shenguang to Huike, which means, "Wisdom and Capacity". (Note: Tao-hsuan (?-667), writing in the Further Biographies of Eminent Monks(Wade-Giles: Hsu kao-seng chuan; Japanese: Zoku kōsōden) says that Huike had his arm cut off by bandits. (McRae (1986) p 24; Dumoulin, p 88))

=== Pacifying the mind ===
Huike said to Bodhidharma, "My mind is anxious. Please pacify it."
Bodhidharma replied, "Bring me your mind, and I will pacify it."
Huike said, "Although I've sought it, I cannot find it."
"There," Bodhidharma replied, "I have pacified your mind." (Note: Compare with the Jueguan lun: Gateway, abruptly standing on his feet, asks Master Attainment, saying, "What is that which is called 'mind'? How do we put the mind at ease?" Master says in answer, "You need not suppose a mind, nor need you particularly endeavor to put one at ease. That can be spoken of as putting the mind at ease.")

=== Awakening ===
According to the Denkoroku, when Huike and Bodhidharma were climbing up Few Houses Peak, Bodhidharma asked, "Where are we going?"
Huike replied, "Please go right ahead---that's it."
Bodhidharma retorted, "If you go right ahead, you cannot move a step."
Upon hearing these words, Huike was enlightened.

=== Transmission ===
==== Skin, flesh, bone, marrow ====
Legend has it that Bodhidharma wished to return to India and called together his disciples and the following exchange took place;

Bodhidharma asked, "Can each of you say something to demonstrate your understanding?"

Dao Fu stepped forward and said, "It is not bound by words and phrases, nor is it separate from words and phrases. This is the function of the Tao."
Bodhidharma: "You have attained my skin."
The nun, Zong Chi, stepped up and said, "It is like a glorious glimpse of the realm of Akshobhya Buddha. Seen once, it need not be seen again."
Bodhidharma: "You have attained my flesh."
Dao Yu said, "The four elements are all empty. The five skandhas are without actual existence. Not a single dharma can be grasped."
Bodhidharma: "You have attained my bones."
Finally, Huike came forth, bowed deeply in silence, and stood up straight.

Bodhidharma said, "You have attained my marrow."

Bodhidharma passed on the symbolic robe and bowl of dharma succession to Huike and, some texts claim, a copy of the Lankavatara Sutra. Bodhidharma then either returned to India or died.

== Teachings ==
=== Dhyana ===
There is little doubt that Huike practiced and promoted meditation (as opposed to sutra commentary) as the method to reach understanding of true Buddhism. Tao-hsuan referred to Huike (and others) as dhyana masters (Wade–Giles: ch'an-shih; Japanese: zenji), highlighting the importance of meditation practice in these early years of Chan development. However, what form Huike and Bodhidharma's meditation took (which Tao-hsuan labelled ju shih an-hsin wei pi-kuan (如是安心壁覯 "wall gazing" or "wall contemplation", lit "if so, peace of mind wall seeing") is unclear.

=== Sudden awakening ===
One of the most important characteristics of the early Chán of Bodhidharma and Huike was the sudden approach to enlightenment rather than the Indian yogic meditation which advocated concentration and gradual self-perfection.

Huike wrote:

Originally deluded, one calls the mani-pearl a potsherd
Suddenly one is awakened---and it is [recognized] as a pearl
Ignorance and wisdom are identical, not different.

=== Lankavatara Sutra ===
There is some evidence that both Huike and Bodhidharma based their teachings on the Lankavatara Sutra, although this cannot be firmly established by modern scholars. Tao-hsuan listed Huike and his circle of disciples as masters of meditation, and the Lankavatara Sutra, in his Further Biographies of Eminent Monks (Chinese: 高僧傳; Wade–Giles: Hsu kao-seng chuan; Japanese pronunciation: Zoku kōsōden)

This sutra urges ‘self-enlightenment', the "forgetting of words and thoughts".

=== Two Entrances ===
One text that was circulating at the time of Huike was the Treatise on the Two Entrances and Four Practices (Wade–Giles: Erh-ju ssu-hsing lun; Pinyin: Erru sixing lun). This text was the purported teachings of Bodhidharma with a preface by T'an Lin (fl. 525–543) (Note: McRae says that this text is the only work that "can legitimately be attributed to Bodhidharma." p 101)

The "two entrances" refers to the entrance of principle and the entrance of practice.

- The entrance of principle is that one must have faith in the truth of the teachings and that everyone possesses the same "true nature" which is covered up by "false senses".
- The entrance of practice refers to the four practices of the title: be undisturbed by suffering, accept one's circumstances and be unmoved by good or bad fortune, be without attachment or desire and, finally, govern one's actions based on understanding the emptiness or non-substantiality of all things.

=== Buddha-nature ===
Attached to the text are some letters, one of which may have been written to Huike, and Huike's brief reply. The Bodhidharma text and Huike's letter indicate that the earliest teachings of what was to become Chan emphasized that Buddha Nature was within, and each person must realize this individually through meditation rather than studying the sutras, ceremonies, doing good deeds, or worshiping the Buddhas. Meditation should be free of any dualism or attached goal and realization occurs suddenly.

== Sources ==
- Cleary, Thomas (1999) Transmission of Light: Zen in the Art of Enlightenment by Zen Master Keizan, North Point Press ISBN 0-86547-433-8
- Dumoulin, Heinrich (1994,1998) Zen Buddhism: a history, India and China, Macmillan Publishing, ISBN 0-02-897109-4
- Faure, Bernard, Bodhidharma as Textual and Religious Paradigm in History of Religions, Vol. 25, No. 3. (Feb., 1986)
- Ferguson, Andy (2000) Zen's Chinese Heritage: the masters and their teachings, Wisdom Publications, ISBN 0-86171-163-7
- McRae, John (1986) The Northern School and the Formation of Early Ch'an Buddhism, University of Hawaii Press, ISBN 0-8248-1056-2
- The Shambhala Dictionary of Buddhism and Zen (1991) Shambhala, ISBN 0-87773-520-4
- Yampolsky, Philip (1999) Ch'an, a Historical Sketch in Buddhist Spirituality in Later China, Korea, Japan and the Modern World, Takeuchi Yoshinori (ed); SCM Press ISBN 0-334-02779-9 p 5

Buddhist titles
Preceded by Bodhidharma	Ch'an patriarch	Succeeded by Sengcan
