= Sengcan =

Patriarch of Chán Buddhism

Jianzhi Sengcan
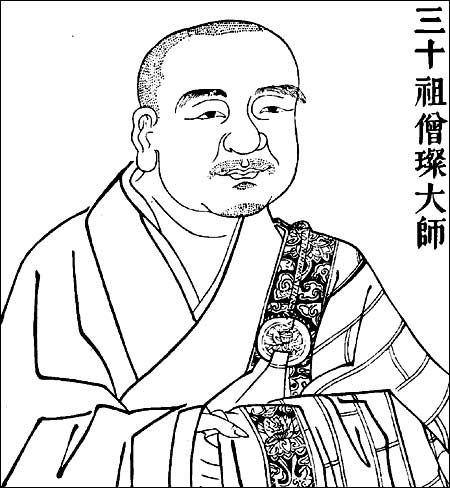
- Title: Third Chinese Patriarch

Personal life
- Born: 496? China
- Died: 606

Religious life
- Religion: Buddhism
- School: Chan

Senior posting
- Predecessor: Dazu Huike
- Successor: Dayi Daoxin

Jianzhi Sengcan (Chinese: 鑑智僧璨; Pīnyīn: Jiànzhì Sēngcàn; Wade–Giles: Chien-chih Seng-ts'an; Rōmaji: Kanchi Sōsan) is known as the Third Chinese Patriarch of Chán after Bodhidharma and thirtieth Patriarch after Siddhārtha Gautama Buddha.

He is considered to be the Dharma successor of the second Chinese Patriarch, Dazu Huike (Chinese: 大祖慧可; Pīnyīn: Dàzǔ Huìkě; Wade–Giles: Ta-tsu Hui-k’o; Rōmaji: Taiso Eka). Sengcan is best known as the putative author of the famous Chan poem, Xinxin Ming (Chinese: 信心銘; Pīnyīn: Xìnxīn Míng; Wade–Giles: Hsin-hsin Ming), the title of which means "Inscription on Faith in Mind".

== Biography ==
The year and place of Sengcan's birth are unknown, as is his family name.

=== Huike ===
It is said that Sengcan (old spelling: Tsang Tsan) was over forty years old when he first met Huike in 536 and that he stayed with his teacher for six years. (Dumoulin, p 97) It was Huike who gave him the name Sengcan (“Gem Monk”).

The Transmission of the Lamp entry on Sengcan begins with a koan-like encounter with Huike:

Sengcan: I am riddled with sickness. (Note: Said to be leprosy) Please absolve me of my sin.
Huike: Bring your sin here and I will absolve you.
Sengcan (after a long pause): When I look for my sin, I cannot find it.
Huike: I have absolved you. You should live by the Buddha, the Dharma, and the Sangha. (Note: Compare with Huike’s meeting with his teacher, Bodhidharma: Huike: My mind is not at ease---please pacify it for me! Bodhidharma: Bring me your mind, and I will. Huike: But no matter how I might look, the mind is not a ‘thing’ I can find. Bodhidharma: There, I’ve pacified your mind for you!”) (Note: See also Three Language-Related Methods In Early Chinese Chan Buddhism by Desheng Zong</re)

There are discrepancies about how long Sengcan stayed with Huike. The Transmission of the Lamp records that he “attended Huike for two years” after which Huike passed on the robe of Bodhidharma and Bodhidharma's Dharma (generally considered to be the Lankavatara Sutra), making him the Third Patriarch of Chan.

According to Dumoulin, in 574 the accounts say that he fled with Huike to the mountains due to the Buddhist persecution underway at that time. However, the Lamp records claim that after giving Sengcan Dharma transmission, Huike warned Sengcan to live in the mountains and “Wait for the time when you can transmit the Dharma to someone else.” as a prediction made to Bodhidharma (Huike's teacher) by Prajnadhara, the twenty-seventh Chan ancestor in India, foretold of a coming calamity. (Note: the Buddhist persecution of 574-577)

After receiving transmission, Sengcan lived in hiding on Wangong Mountain in Yixian and then on Sikong Mountain in southwestern Anhui. Thereafter, for ten years he wandered with no fixed abode.

=== Daoxin ===
He met Daoxin, (580-651) (Note: Wade-Giles: Tao-hsin 道信; Japanese: Daii Doshin) a novice monk of just fourteen, in 592. (Note: The discrepancy is noted. The 592 date comes from Ferguson, p 24) Daoxin attended Sengcan for nine years and received Dharma transmission when he was still in his early twenties.

Subsequently, Sengcan spent two years at Mount Luofu (Lo-fu shan, northeast of Kung-tung (Canton)) before returning to Wangong Mountain. He died sitting under a tree before a Dharma assembly in 606.

Dumoulin notes that a Chinese official, Li Ch’ang found Sengcan's grave in Shu-chou in 745 or 746.

Sengcan received the honorary title Jianzhi 鑑智 (“Mirror Wisdom”) (Note: Wade-Giles, Chien-chih; Japanese, Kanchi) from the Tang dynasty emperor Xuan Zong.

== Teachings ==
Sengcan, like Bodhidharma and Huike before him, was reputed to be a devotee and specialist in the study of the Lankavatara Sutra, which taught the elimination of all duality and the “forgetting of words and thoughts”, stressing the contemplation of wisdom.

However, McRae describes the link between Bodhidharma (and therefore Sengcan) and the Lankavatara Sutra as “superficial”. The link between this sutra and the “Bodhidharma school” is provided in Tao-hsuan's Further Biographies of Eminent Monks where, in the biography of Fa-ch’ung he “stresses that Hui-k’o was the first to grasp the essence of the Lankavatara Sutra” and includes Sengcan as one who “discoursed on but did not write about the profound message of the Lankavatara Sutra. Due to the lack of authentic evidence, comments on Sengcan's teachings are speculative.

== Writings ==
Although Sengcan has traditionally been honored as the author of the Xinxin Ming (W-G:Hsin-hsin Ming, "Faith in Mind"), most modern scholars dismiss this as improbable. (Note: “The poem Faith in Mind (Xin Xin Ming) is believed by many scholars to have been written after Sengcan’s lifetime, perhaps by an individual in the Oxhead school.” (Ferguson, p 492 n.18) see also Dumoulin p 97)

== Limited sources ==
The historical record of Sengcan is extremely limited. Of all the Chan patriarchs, Sengcan is the most ambiguous and the least known:

We have no certain information regarding Seng-ts’an. The course of his life lies in darkness.”

=== Further Biographies of Eminent Monks ===
The earliest recorded note naming Sengcan is in Further Biographies of Eminent Monks (645) (Japanese, Zoku kosoden; Pinyin, Xu gaoseng zhuan) by Daoxuan (?- 667) where Sengcan is named, immediately after Huike’s name, as one of seven disciples of Huike in a biographical entry of the Lankavatara sutra master, Fa-ch’ung (587-665). No further information is given.

It was not until the Records of the Transmission of the Dharma-treasure (Sh’uan fa-pao chi), compiled about 710 and drawing on the stories in the Further Biographies of Eminent Monks, that a teaching “lineage” for Chan was created. Some have speculated that it was merely the fact that Sengcan's name immediately followed Huike's name in the latter work that led to him being named as the Third Patriarch of Chan.

=== Transmission of the Lamp ===
Therefore, the biography that follows is garnered largely from traditional biographies of Sengcan, mainly the Transmission of the Lamp.

Most of what is known about his life comes from the Wudeng Huiyuan (Compendium of Five Lamps), compiled in the early 13th century by the monk Puji at Lingyin Temple in Hangzhou.

The first of the five records in the compendium is a text known as the Transmission of the Lamp, and it is from this text that most of the information about Sengcan is garnered.

However, it should be kept in mind that most modern scholars have some doubts about the historical accuracy of the Lamp records. (Note: “... what counts in the Chan transmissions scheme are not the “facts” of what happened…but rather how these figures were perceived in terms of Chan mythology. ... what the texts say happened almost certainly did not occur” (original emphasis))

== Sources ==
- Thomas Cleary (1990) Transmission of Light: Zen in the Art of Enlightenment by Zen Master Keizan, North Point Press ISBN 0-86547-433-8
- Dumoulin, Heinrich (1994, 1998) Zen Buddhism: A History, Volume I, India and China, Simon & Schuster and Prentice Hall International ISBN 0-02-897109-4
- Ferguson, Andy (2000) Zen's Chinese heritage: the masters and their teachings, ISBN 0-86171-163-7
- Chen, Jinhua (1999) "One Name, Three Monks: Two Northern Chan Masters Emerge from the Shadow of Their Contemporary, the Tiantai Master Zhanran 湛然 (711–782)." The Journal of the International Association of Buddhist Studies 22 (1): 1-91.
- McRae, John R (1986) The Northern School and the Formation of Early Ch'an Buddhism, University of Hawaii Press, ISBN 0-8248-1056-2
- McRae, John R (2003) Seeing Through Zen: Encounter, Transformation, and Genealogy in Chinese Chan Buddhism, University of California Press ISBN 0-520-23798-6

Buddhist titles
Preceded by Dazu Huike	Ch'an patriarch	Succeeded by Dao Xin
