= Yuquan Shenxiu =

Chinese Chan-master

- Title: Chan Master

Personal life
- Born: 606 / 607? Luoyang, Henan, China
- Died: February 28, 706 or April 15, 706 China

Religious life
- Religion: Chan Buddhism
- School: East Mountain Teaching

Senior posting
- Predecessor: Daman Hongren

Yuquan Shenxiu (Chinese: 玉泉神秀; pinyin: Yùquán Shénxiù; Wade–Giles: Yü-ch'üan Shen-hsiu, 606?–706) was one of the most influential Chan masters of his day, a Patriarch of the East Mountain Teaching of Chan Buddhism. Shenxiu was Dharma heir of Daman Hongren (601–674), honoured by Wu Zetian (r. 690–705) of the Tang dynasty, and the putative author of the Guan Xin Lun (Treatise on the Contemplation of the Mind, written between 675 and 700), a text once attributed to Bodhidharma.

== Biography ==
Shenxiu was born in Weishi County, suburb of Luoyang, Henan, then secondary capital of China. His family name was Li. His family was aristocratic and may have been related to the Tang dynasty imperial family He was educated in the Chinese classics and Taoism and became a Buddhist at the age of thirteen when he went to the government granaries at Kaifeng during a famine to plead the release of grain to the starving population. There he met an unnamed Buddhist and was inspired to take up Buddhism. After some seven years of a homeless life visiting the famous mountain centres of China, Shenxiu took the full precepts of Buddhist monk in 625 at Tankong monastery in Luoyang(洛阳), the Buddhist centre at the end of Silk Road since the second century.

Traces of his activities for the next twenty-five years were lost, the Chuan Fabao Ji (傳法寶紀) (Annals of the Transmission of the Dharma-treasure) claim that Shenxiu studied the Buddhist regulations (vinaya) and ceremonies and devoted himself to the practice of meditation (dhyāna) and the development of wisdom (prajñā). In 651 he began to study under Hongren. The aforementioned Chuan Fabao Ji states that he studied with Hongren for six years, thereby leaving in 657, before the arrival of the Sixth Patriarch, Huineng, with whom Shenxiu supposedly had the famous verse-writing contest. (see below)

It is not clear why, but sometime around 665–668, Shenxiu was banished by the emperor and remained in hiding for ten years, returning to public notice between 676 and 679. He initially took up residence at the Jade Spring Monastery (Yuquan Si 玉泉寺) but soon one was built for him, the Monastery of the Six Perfections (Dumen Si 度門寺廟) where he spent the next quarter century.

In late 700 the Empress Wu invited Shenxiu to the capital at Luoyang to teach Chan Buddhism. His welcome in 701 was by all accounts quite spectacular. The Annals of the Transmission of the Dharma-treasure describe Shenxiu's path being bedecked with flowers and the master riding on a litter of the type reserved for the imperial family. In an unprecedented gesture, the Empress knelt before the Chan master, touching her forehead to the ground in reverence. The Annals go on to say that “From princes and nobles down, everyone [in the capital] took refuge in him.”

For the last five years of his life, Shenxiu traveled between the two capitals of Luoyang and Chang'an, preaching the Buddhist Dharma before dying at his monastery, Tumen Si, reportedly sitting in meditation, on February 28, 706. The Lengqie Shi Zi Ji (楞伽師資記; Records of the Lankavatara Masters) state that his last words were ch’u-ch’u chiao, which Professor Seizan Yanagida translates as “the teachings of the expedient means have been made direct” The reigning Emperor Zhongzong (705-710) granted the posthumous title Datong Chanshi (大通禪師; Greatly Penetrating Dhyāna Master), only the second time in Chinese Buddhism and the first for three hundred years that this imperial honour had been bestowed.

== Verse contest ==
One of the most well-known and cherished legends in Chan is the verse writing contest involving Shenxiu and Huineng at Hongren's monastery. The story can be found in the Platform Sutra of Huineng, but it was almost certainly not an historical event. The account given in the Platform Sutra is as follows: Hongren, realizing he was coming to the end of his years, instructed his monks to compose a "mind-verse" to demonstrate their level of attainment. The winner of the contest would be named Sixth Patriarch and receive the robe of Bodhidharma. None of the monks dared to write anything, deferring to Shenxiu who they believed would be the rightful Dharma heir. Shenxiu, full of doubts about his own motivations and with the weight of expectation upon him, chose to write a verse anonymously on a corridor wall in the night. Shenxiu's verse read:

The body is the bodhi tree
The mind is like a bright mirror's stand.
At all times we must strive to polish it
and must not let dust collect.

Publicly, Hongren praised this verse and instructed all his monks to recite it. Privately, Hongren asked Shenxiu to compose another verse as Hongren believed that Shenxiu's verse did not display true understanding of the Dharma. Shenxiu was unable to compose another verse. Meanwhile, the illiterate Huineng heard the monks chanting this verse and asked about it. When told the story of Hongren's contest, Huineng asked a monk to take him to the wall where Shenxiu's verse was written. There he asked someone to write his own verse. According to a later version of the Platform Sutra (two significant variants exist in older versions), Huineng's verse read

Bodhi originally has no tree.
The bright mirror also has no stand.
Fundamentally there is not a single thing.
Where could dust arise?

The account says that publicly Hongren denigrated this verse but that later, in private, he taught Huineng the true meaning of the Diamond Sutra, thereby awakening Huineng to the sutra's profound teaching. Hongren gave Huineng the robe of transmission and told him to flee the monastery in secret at night. According to the legend, Huineng thereby became the Sixth and last Patriarch of Chan.

Shenhui, a successor of Huineng, publicly criticized Shenxiu and associated him with the "Northern School", a term which Shenhui is thought to have invented. He claimed this "school" taught a "gradualist" (jian jiao 漸教) idea of enlightenment as opposed to Huineng's supposedly superior "sudden" (dun jiao 頓教) teaching. However, although a substantial amount of Shenhui's polemics survive, he is never recorded as mentioning this verse contest, which he presumably would have done in order to bolster the case for his descent from the superior Huineng. For this reason, in part, scholars doubt the historicity of the verse contest. Instead, it is thought that the Platform Sutra was composed by the Oxhead school in an attempt to reconcile the artificial split between the so-called Northern and Southern Schools. According to the Buddhologist John McRae, the two verses were likely intended to complement one another and speak of two sides of one practice. Further, Shenxiu's verse does not explicitly suggest gradualism, but rather alludes to a need for constant, unending practice. Whatever the case may be, historically speaking it is clear that Shenxiu was a far more respected and prominent teacher than the virtually unknown Huineng, who only became famous through later hagiography, including the Platform Sutra.

== Teachings ==
Although Shenxiu was labeled a teacher of the “Northern School” (Beizong 北宗) of Chan in subsequent histories of Chan, he saw himself as teaching in the “East Mountain” (Dongshan 東山) tradition of Hongren. The “Northern School” appellation was applied in the early 730s by the monk Shenhui who accused Shenxiu of teaching a “gradualist” approach to Chan Buddhism.

Shenxiu was highly educated and studied the Buddhist scriptures assiduously. He re-interpreted the scriptures as metaphors of “skilful means” (Sanskrit: upāya; fangbian 方便) for “contemplation of the mind," (kan xin 看心) advocating the attainment of Buddhahood in all daily activities, here and now. Every act was seen as religious practice. For example, he saw simple activities, like taking a bath, as a religious act. He taught that soap used to clean away dirt “is actually the ability of discrimination by which one can ferret out the sources of evil within oneself.” Cleaning the mouth with toothpicks is “nothing less than the Truth by which one puts an end to false speech.” Overt religious activities such as burning of incense were seen as “the unconditioned Dharma, which ‘perfumes’ the tainted and evil karma of ignorance and cause it to disappear.”

In meditation practice, Shenxiu taught that the student should develop the innate ability of the mind “to illuminate and understand all things” and to see the emptiness of all things. He taught that there is a profound stillness and tranquility in all things. A “Northern School” text abbreviated as the Five Skillful Means (Wu Fangbian 五方便) states: “in purity there is not a single thing…Peaceful and vast without limit, its untaintedness is the path of bodhi (बोधि). The mind serene and enlightenment distinct, the body’s serenity is the bodhi tree.”

Even though Shenxiu and the so-called “Northern School” were subsequently attacked as teaching a gradualist approach to enlightenment, the Guanxin Lun (觀心論; Treatise on the Contemplation of the Mind), a Northern text which Zen scholar John McRae claims is “unquestionably written by him [Shenxiu]” emphatically states: “It does not take long to witness this (i.e., to realize sagehood); enlightenment is in the instant. Why worry about your white hair (i.e., about your age)?” Shenxiu's exhortations to constant, unremitting practice gave Shenhui the opening to attack the teaching as “gradualist” (a charge which would ironically apply to the entire Dongshan tradition of the Fourth and Fifth Patriarchs). In any case, the vilification of Shenxiu by Shenhui occurred some thirty years after Shenxiu's death. During his lifetime, and especially his relatively brief teaching in the capital cities of the Tang dynasty, Shenxiu's teachings were received with widespread acceptance and reverence. The influence of Shenxiu's teachings on subsequent Chan doctrine and practices is still a somewhat open question.

== See also ==
- Pao-t'ang Wu-chu(Chinese: 無住; 714-774CE)
