= Daman Hongren =

Chinese Buddhist patriarch (601–674)

Hongren
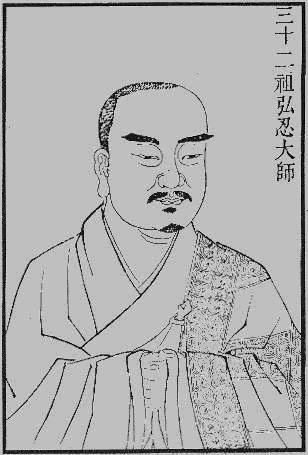
- Title: 5th Chan Patriarch

Personal life
- Born: 601
- Died: 674 (aged 72–73)

Religious life
- Religion: Buddhism
- School: East Mountain Teaching of Chan Buddhism

Senior posting
- Predecessor: Dayi Daoxin
- Successor: Huineng
- Students: Huineng Shenxiu Faru

Hongren (Chinese: 弘忍; pinyin: Hóngrěn; Wade–Giles: Hung^{2}-jen^{3}, 601–674), posthumous name Daman, was the 5th Patriarch of Chan Buddhism (Chinese: 禪宗五祖).

Hongren is said to have received Dharma transmission from Dayi Daoxin and passed on the symbolic bowl and robe of transmission to Huineng, the Sixth and last Chan Patriarch.

== Biography ==
As with all the early Chan patriarchs, many of the details of Hongren’s life are uncertain and much of his biography is layered with legend added well after his death. The following biography is based on Chan traditional sources.

=== Childhood ===
Hongren was born in Huangmei with the family name Chou. His father abandoned the family but Hongren displayed exemplary filial duty in supporting his mother.

Although the Records of the Teachers and Disciples of the Lankavatara claim that Hongren’s father abandoned the family, Chan scholar John McRae points out that Hongren’s residence was converted to a monastery, implying that Hongren’s family was probably wealthy and prominent locally. Furthermore, mention of Hongren doing menial labour would only be of significance if this were unusual, indicating that Hongren was of upper-class birth.

=== Chán-studies under Daoxin ===
At the age of either seven or twelve, Hongren left home to become a monk and began his studies under Daoxin, who, according to tradition, immediately recognized his insight:

Daoxin met Hongren on a road in Huangmei. Daoxin asked his name.
Hongren replied, “I have essence but it is not a common name.”
The Chan master asked, “What name is it?”
Hongren said, “It is the essence of Buddhahood.”
Daoxin replied, “Have you no name?”
Hongren said, “None, because essence is empty.”
With this, Daoxin passed on the teaching and the robe (making Hongren the next Patriarch of Chan).

The Ch’üan fa pao chi (Annals of the Transmission of the Dharma-treasure), written approximately 712, says that Hongren was quiet and withdrawn, diligent in his menial labors, and sat in meditation throughout the night. He “never looked at the Buddhist scriptures” but understood everything he heard. After some ten years of teaching, the record claims that “eight or nine of every ten ordained and lay aspirants in the country had studied under him.”

Hongren stayed with Daoxin until the latter’s death in 651. Presumably, he was with Daoxin when the master was at Ta-lin ssu on Mount Lou and followed him to Mount Shuangfeng, one of the “twin peaks” of Huangmei.

== Teachings ==
=== East mountain Teaching ===
Hongren was significant in the development of early Chinese Chan.

The teachings of both Daoxin and Hongren became known as the “East Mountain Teachings”, but Hongren was the more prominent of the two.

Later tradition has it that Hongren, after Daoxin’s death, moved the community of monks to the East Peak, the easterly of the “Twin Peaks”. The teachings of Daoxin and Hongren became known as the East Mountain Teaching.

The East Mountain Teachings were seen as the “authentic” Chan Buddhist teachings as promoted by Hongren’s student, Yuquan Shenxiu (606?-706), the most prominent Buddhist monk of his time. Hongren’s significance can be noted by the fact that a compilation of his teachings, presumably shortly after his death, the Treatise on the Essentials of Cultivating the Mind, (Chinese: 修心要論; pinyin: Xiūxīnyào lùn) is the earliest collection of the teachings of a Chan master.

=== Meditation practice ===
Although Hongren’s students included Vinaya specialists, sutra translators, and Huayan and Pure Land devotees, Hongren’s teaching focused on meditation practice. According to the Treatise on the Essentials of Cultivating the Mind, Hongren's basic teaching was that the Pure Mind was obscured by “discriminating thinking, false thoughts, and ascriptive views.” Eliminating false thoughts and maintaining a constant awareness of one’s natural enlightenment ensures Nirvana naturally arises.

Two meditation techniques are specifically mentioned in the Treatise. Hongren is said to have instructed, "Look to where the horizon disappears beyond the sky and behold the figure one. … It is good for those beginning to sit in meditation, when they find their mind distracted, to focus their mind on the figure one." The Chinese character for "one" is a single horizontal line, resembling a horizon, and metaphorically represents the unity of the mind and Buddha nature.

He also taught that the meditator should observe the mental processes within: "View your own consciousness tranquilly and attentively, so that you can see how it is always moving, like flowing water or a glittering mirage. …until its fluctuations dissolve into peaceful stability. This flowing consciousness will disappear like a gust of wind. When this consciousness disappears, all one’s illusions will disappear along with it."

== Influence ==
Hongren was held in high esteem by later Chan-adepts in the ancient capital cities of Chang'an and Luoyang in the early eighth century, when Chan moved from a rural base to the centre of Chinese power, in the major urban areas and the imperial court.

| | Predecessors |
| 5 | Daman Hongren (601-674)(5th Patriarch) (WG Ta-man Hung-jen, Jpn. Gunin) |
| 6 | Yuquan Shenxiu (605?-706) (WG Yü-Ch'uan shen-hsiu, Jpn. Jinshū) | Huineng (638-713) (WG Hui-neng, Jpn. Enō) |
| 7 | Northern School | Qingyuan Xingsi (660-740) (WG Ch'ing-yüan Hsing-ssu, Jpn. Seigen Gyōshi) | Nanyue Huairang (677-744) (wg Nan-yüeh Huai-jang, Jpn. Nangaku Ejō) | Heze Shenhui (WG Ho-tse Shen-hui, Jpn. Kataku Jin'e) |
| 8 | | Shitou Xiqian (700-790) (WG Shih-t'ou Hsi-ch'ien, Jpn. Sekitō Kisen) | Mazu Daoyi (709-788) (WG Ma-tsu Tao-i, Jpn. Baso Dōitsu) | Heze School (WG Ho-tse School, Jpn. Kataku School) |
| 9 | | Fayan school Yunmen school Caodong school | Hongzhou school Linji school |
| | | | | Fifth generation: Guifeng Zongmi (780–841) ((圭峰 宗密 WG Kuei-feng Tsung-mi, Jpn. Keihō Shūmitsu) |

== Notes ==
Buddhist titles
| Preceded by Dayi Daoxin | Chan Patriarch | Succeeded by Huineng |
