= Dayi Daoxin =

Chinese Buddhist patriarch (580–651 CE)

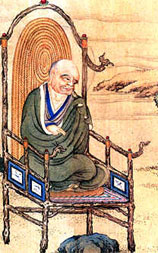
- Title: Fourth Chan Patriarch; Dayi (Great Healer)

Personal life
- Born: 580
- Died: 651 East Mountain Temple, Shuangfeng

Religious life
- Religion: Buddhism
- School: Early Chan, East Mountain Teachings

Senior posting
- Predecessor: Jianzhi Sengcan
- Successor: Daman Hongren

Dayi Daoxin (Chinese: 大毉道信; Pinyin: Dàyī Dàoxìn; Wade–Giles: Ta-i Tao-hsin; Rōmaji: Daii Dōshin), who lived from 580 to 651, was the fourth Chán Buddhist Patriarch, following Jianzhi Sengcan (Chinese: 鑑智僧璨; Pīnyīn: Jiànzhì Sēngcàn; Wade–Giles: Chien-chih Seng-ts'an; Rōmaji: Kanchi Sōsan) and preceding Daman Hongren (Chinese: 弘忍; Pinyin: Hóngrěn; Wade–Giles: Hung^{2}-jen^{3}; Rōmaji: Kōnin/Gunin; Korean romanization: Hong'in).

The earliest mention of Daoxin is in the "Further Biographies of Eminent Monks" (Chinese: 續高僧傳; Pīnyīn: Xù Gāosēng Zhuàn; Wade–Giles: Hsü Kao-seng Chuan; Rōmaji: Zoku Kosoden) by Tao-hsuan (d. 667). A later source, the "Annals of the Transmission of the Dharma-treasure" (Chinese: 傳法寶記; Pīnyīn: Chuánfǎ Bǎojì; Wade–Giles: Ch'üanfa Paochi) written around 712, gives further details of Daoxin's life. As with many of the very earliest Chan masters, the accuracy of the historical record is questionable and in some cases, contradictory in details. The following biography is the traditional story of Daoxin, culled from various sources, including the "Compendium of Five Lamps" (Chinese: 五燈會元; Pīnyīn: Wǔdēng Huìyuán), compiled in the early thirteenth century by the monk Dachuan Lingyin Puji (1179–1253).

== Biography ==
Daoxin, whose surname was Si-ma, was born in Yongning County, Qizhou (Chinese: 蕲州府永宁县), which is the former Guangji County (Chinese: 湖北省广济县; 742–1987), renamed in 1987 as Wuxue City, Hubei Province (Chinese: 湖北省武穴市). He began studying Buddhism at the age of seven and although his teacher was a man of impure moral conduct, Daoxin maintained the Buddhist morality on his own without his teacher's knowledge for five or six years.

According to Jianzhi Sengcan's chronicle in the Compendium of Five Lamps, Daoxin met Sengcan when he was only fourteen years old. The following exchange took place:

Daoxin: I ask for the Master’s compassion. Please instruct me on how to achieve release.
Sengcan: Is there someone who constrains [binds] you?
Daoxin: There is no such person.
Sengcan: Why then seek release when you are constrained by no one?

Upon hearing these words, Daoxin was enlightened. He attended to Sengcan for the next nine years. When Sengcan went to Mount Lo-fu he refused permission for Daoxin to follow him, saying “The Dharma has been transmitted from Patriarch [Bodhi]dharma to me. I am going to the South and will leave you [here] to spread and protect [the Dharma].”(from the Ch’üan fa pao chi) For ten years he studied with Zhikai at Great Woods Temple on Mount Lu. Zhikai (Wade–Giles: Shih-k’ai) was an adept of the Tiantai and Sanlun schools and also chanted the Buddha's name as part of his practice; Daoxin's practice was influenced by these other schools. Daoxin received ordination as a monk in 607.

In 617, Daoxin and some of his disciples traveled to Ji Province (modern Ji'an City in Jiangxi Province) and entered the town, which was under siege by bandits. Daoxin taught the residents the Mahaprajnaparamita Sutra (Perfection of Wisdom) which caused the bandits to abandon their siege.

Daoxin eventually settled at East Mountain Temple on Shuangfeng ("Twin Peaks") where he taught Chan Buddhism for thirty years and attracted large numbers of practitioners, some records say five hundred laypeople and monks. In 643 the emperor Tai Zong invited Daoxin to the capital city but Daoxin refused to appear. Three times the emperor sent emissaries and three times Daoxin refused the invitation. The third time the emperor instructed to either bring back Daoxin or his head. When the emissary related this instruction to Daoxin, Daoxin exposed and stretched out his neck to allow the emissary to chop off his head. The envoy was so shocked he reported this event to the emperor, who then honored Daoxin as an exemplary Buddhist monk.

In August, 651, Daoxin ordered his students to build his stupa as he was soon to die. According to the Hsü kao-seng chuan, when asked by his disciples to name a successor, Daoxin replied, “I have made many deputations during my life.” He then died. The emperor Dai Zong honored Daoxin with the posthumous name “Dayi” (Great Healer).

== Teachings ==
The teachings of Daoxin (and his successor, Hongren) are known as the East Mountain Teachings, a precursor to the flowering of Chan on a national scale some seventy-five years later at the beginning of the eighth century. Of significance is that Daoxin was the first Chan master to settle at one spot for an extended period of time, developing a stable community life which would lead to monastic Chan communities throughout China. Dumoulin speculates that as alms begging was no longer viable (due to the size of Daoxin's community and its relative isolation from centers of population), the monks had no choice but to work in the fields and develop administrative skills as well as engage in meditation practice. Henceforth, Chan practice could no longer be confined to the meditation hall but the spirit of practice had to extend to the daily duties as well. The need to extend religious practice to all aspects of one's life became a central theme in Chan teachings.

As the record of Daoxin's teachings (The Five Gates of Daoxin) did not appear until the second decade of the eighth century, after Hongren's record, its historical accuracy is in some doubt. The Chronicle of the Lankavatara Masters, which appeared in the early eighth century, has Daoxin quoting from the Prajnaparamita (Perfection of Wisdom) and Pure Land sutras, although McRae refers to an anecdote in Daoxin's biographical entry in the Xu gaoseng zhuan in which he advises the recitation of the Prajñāpāramitā as “entertaining, but it cannot be taken seriously,” and also notes that the biography lacks any mention of scriptural study or lecturing. According to McRae, this may be an indication that Daoxin elevated the practice of meditation above all else. It is clear that Daoxin taught meditation, for as the Zen scholar Seizan Yanagida observes, the expression “samadhi of one practice” was the heart of Daoxin's practice. The Five Gates of Daoxin quotes him as saying “Buddha is the mind. Outside of the mind there is no Buddha.” In a later chronicle he is quoted exhorting his students to “Sit earnestly in meditation! Sitting in meditation is basic to all else….Do not read the sutras, discuss with no one!” (ibid) On his deathbed, the Compendium of Five Lamps records that Daoxin said, “All of the myriad dharmas of the world are to be dropped away. Each of you, protect this understanding and carry it into the future.”

== Sources ==
- Dumoulin, Heinrich (1994, 1998) Zen Buddhism: A History, Volume I, India and China, Simon & Schuster and Prentice Hall International ISBN 0-02-897109-4
- Ferguson, Andy (2000) Zen's Chinese heritage: the masters and their teachings, ISBN 0-86171-163-7
- McRae, John R (1986) The Northern School and the Formation of Early Ch'an Buddhism, University of Hawaii Press, ISBN 0-8248-1056-2
- Zong, Desheng (2005) Three Language-Related Methods in Early Chinese Chan Buddhism, Philosophy East and West 55.4 (Oct 2005) p 584 (19)

Buddhist titles
Preceded by Sengcan	Ch'an Patriarch	Succeeded by Daman Hongren
