= Heze School =

School of Chinese Buddhism

The Heze School (traditional Chinese: 菏澤宗; simplified Chinese: 菏泽宗; pinyin: Hézézōng, Ho-tse), also called the Southern school, was a short-lived school of Chinese Chan Buddhism during the Tang dynasty that was founded by Heze Shenhui (670–762) and whose last patriarch was Guifeng Zongmi. His writings and interpretation of Chan later strongly influenced Korean Seon Buddhism, particularly through Chinul, well after the school had died out.

== History ==
During the Tang dynasty, an artificial division was created in Chan Buddhism between a dominant "Northern School" led by Yuquan Shenxiu and a self-proclaimed Southern School, with the Northern School being the ascendant school due its government patronage. To strengthen his own position, Heze Shenhui claimed to be a disciple of the then obscurely known Huineng, and starting in 732, began a concerted attack on the Northern School teachings, the then dominant school of Chan. Eventually, this led to the exile of Shenhui until the An Lushan Rebellion, which devastated both Tang capitals. Shenhui and others were recalled to help with rebuilding the eastern capital Luoyang, and Shenhui successfully raised money for the government, which in turn reversed the exile punishment and allowed Shenhui to set up a monastery at Luoyang.

The Northern School greatly diminished after this, but Shenhui's disciples were unable to maintain the status of the Southern School or effectively propagate its teachings until Zongmi. Zongmi, the fifth patriarch, was the most articulate of Shenhui's disciples and went on to write many treatises that influenced Chan Buddhism throughout East Asia.

After Zongmi, the school declined further and virtually disappeared after the Anti-Buddhist Persecution of 845.
