= East Mountain Teaching =

School of Buddhism developed in 8th century China

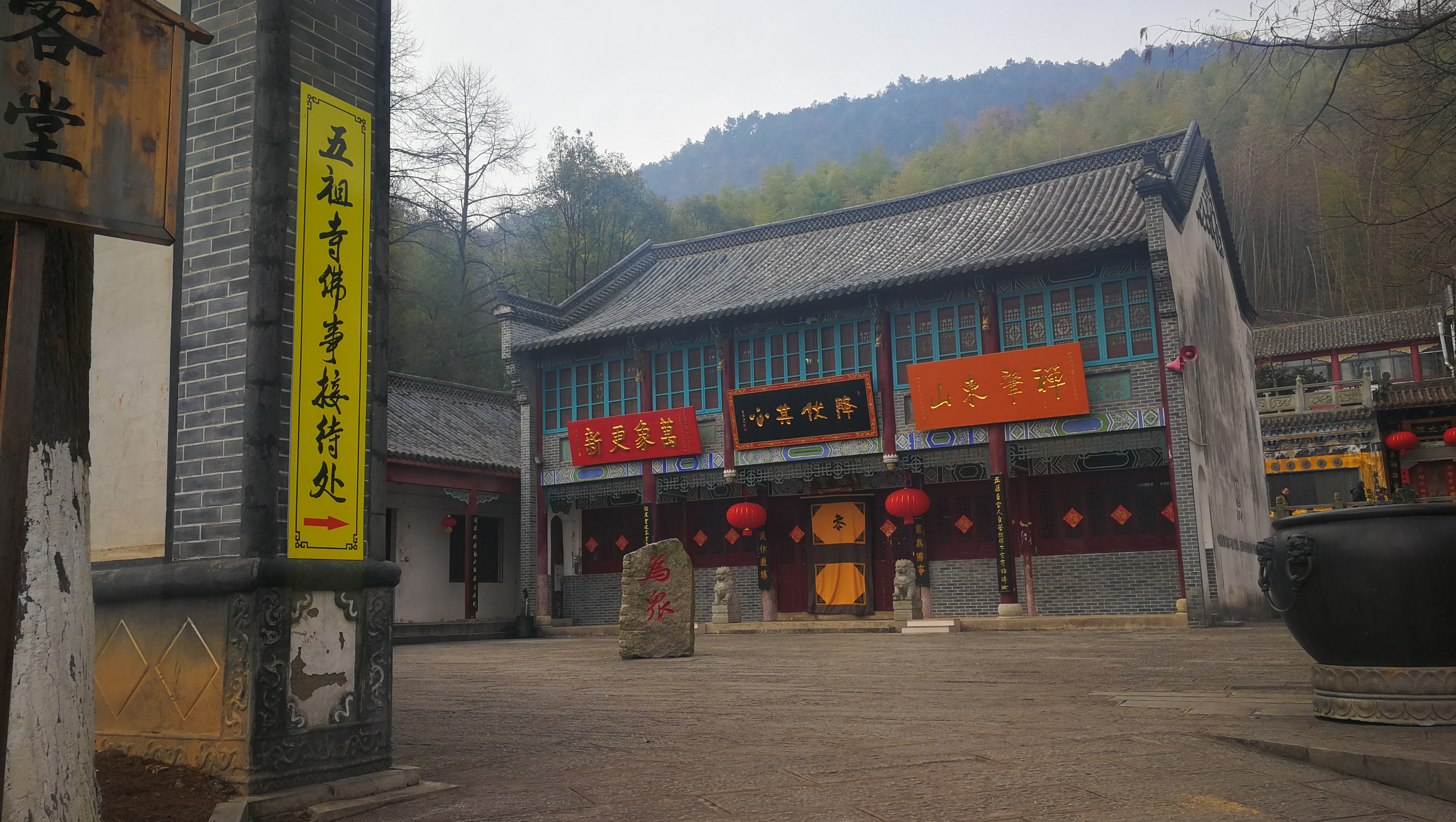
The Buddha reception of Wuzu Temple ("Temple of the 5th Patriarch").

East Mountain Teaching (traditional Chinese: 東山法門; simplified Chinese: 东山法门; pinyin: Dōngshān Fǎmén; lit. 'East Mountain Dharma Gate') denotes the teachings of the Fourth Ancestor Dayi Daoxin, his student and heir the Fifth Ancestor Daman Hongren, and their students and lineage of Chan Buddhism.

East Mountain Teaching gets its name from the East Mountain Temple on the "Twin Peaks" (Chinese: 雙峰) of Huangmei in present-day Hubei. The East Mountain Temple was on the easternmost peak of the two. Its modern name is Wuzu Temple (Chinese: 五祖寺).

The two most famous disciples of Hongren, Huineng and Yuquan Shenxiu, both continued the East Mountain teaching.

== History ==
The East Mountain School was established by Daoxin (道信 580–651) at East Mountain Temple on Potou (Broken Head) Mountain, which was later renamed Shuangfeng (Twin Peaks). Daoxin taught there for 30 years. He established the first monastic home for "Bodhidharma's Zen".

The tradition holds that Hongren (弘忍 601–674) left home at an early age (between seven and fourteen) and lived at East Mountain Temple on Twin Peaks, where Daoxin was the abbot.

Upon Daoxin's death [in 651 C.E]. at the age of seventy-two, Hongren assumed the abbacy. He then moved East Mountain Temple approximately ten kilometers east to the flanks of Mt. Pingmu. Soon, Hongren's fame eclipsed that of his teacher.

== Teachings ==
The East Mountain community was a specialized meditation training centre. The establishment of a community in one location was a change from the wandering lives of Bodhidharma and Huike and their followers. It fit better into Chinese society, which highly valued community-oriented behaviour over solitary practice.

An important aspect of the East Mountain Teachings was its nonreliance on a single sutra or a single set of sutras for its doctrinal foundation as was done by most of the other Buddhist sects of the time.

The East Mountain School incorporated both the Laṅkāvatāra Sūtra and the Mahaprajnaparamita Sutras.

The view of the mind in the Awakening of Faith in the Mahayana also had a significant import on the doctrinal development of the East Mountain Teaching:

In the words of the Awakening of Faith — which summarizes the essentials of Mahayana — self and world, mind and suchness, are integrally one. Everything is a carrier of that a priori enlightenment; all incipient enlightenment is predicated on it. The mystery of existence is, then, not, "How may we overcome alienation?" The challenge is, rather, "Why do we think we are lost in the first place?"

=== Meditation ===
There were three main meditation techniques taught by this school. One was a meditation on śūnyatā "emptiness" in which one contemplates all dharmas of body and mind as empty. Another practice was the contemplation of some 'ultimate principle', this was associated with the 'one-practice samadhi' (Chinese: 一行三昧; pinyin: yīxíng sānmèi) and in some texts such as the Lengqie shizi ji is achieved by meditating on a single Buddha. The third technique was the practice of concentrating the mind on one thing (guan yi wu) until the mind becomes fixed in samadhi. The goal of all of these practices was to not be hindered by the stream of thoughts which clouds the mind and allow the practitioner to gain insight into the pure, radiant consciousness in everyone.

==== Maintaining the One ====
According to John R. McRae the "first explicit statement of the sudden and direct approach that was to become the hallmark of Ch'an religious practice" first appears in a Chinese text named the Ju-tao an-hsin yao-fang-pien fa-men (JTFM, Instructions on essential expedients for calming the mind and accessing the path), itself a part of the Leng Ch'ieh Shih Tzu Chi (Records of the Masters of the Lankavatara). The Records of the Masters of the Lankavatara is associated with the early Chan tradition known as the "East Mountain School" and has been dated to around 713.

This method is named "Maintaining the one without wavering" (shou-i pu i, 守一不移). According to McRae:

...the practical explanation of "maintaining the One without wavering" is that one is simply to contemplate every aspect of one's mental and physical existence, focusing on each individual component with unswerving attention until one realizes its essential emptiness or non-substantiality. The interesting aspect of this regimen is, paradoxically, its apparent conventionality. Although further examination will reveal significant differences between this and traditional Buddhist meditation practice, the description given so far would apply equally well to the most basic of Mahayana techniques: the insight-oriented contemplation of the non-substantiality of the body. Although this type of contemplation is the common property of virtually all schools of Mahayana Buddhism, its presentation here differs in at least two ways from that found in more traditional texts. First, no preparatory requirements, no moral prerequisites or preliminary exercises are given. Instead, one moves directly into the practice of contemplation. Second, the technique of "maintaining the One without wavering" is in itself completely without steps or gradations. One concentrates, understands, and is enlightened, all in one undifferentiated practice.

McRae further notes that

the JTFM makes allowance for both sudden apperception of the Buddha Nature and gradual improvement in the brightness and purity of the concentrated mind...the JTFM actually allows for a number of alternative situations: One may achieve "bright purity" of mind either with or without undertaking the extended practice of "viewing the mind". One may also achieve enlightenment either solely through one's own efforts or, conversely, with the aid of a teacher's instruction. The point of these alternatives is that a true teacher must be able to understand which students are best suited for which approach and to teach them differently on the basis of that understanding.

=== Fourth Patriarch Daoxin (四祖道信) ===
Daoxin is credited with several important innovations that led directly to the ability of Chan to become a popular religion. Among his most important contributions were:

1. The Unification of Chan practice with acceptance of the Buddhist precepts,
2. The unification of the teachings of the Laṅkāvatāra Sūtra with those of the Mahaprajnaparamita Sutras, which includes the well-known Heart Sutra and Diamond Sutra,
3. The incorporation of chanting, including chanting the name of Buddha, into Chan practice.

=== Fifth Patriarch Hongren (五祖弘忍) ===
Hongren was a plain meditation teacher, who taught students of "various religious interests", including "practitioners of the Lotus Sutra, students of Madhyamaka philosophy, or specialists in the monastic regulations of Buddhist Vinaya".

Following Daoxin, Hongren included an emphasis on the Mahaprajnaparamita Sutras, including the Heart Sutra and the Diamond Sutra, along with the emphasis on the Laṅkāvatāra Sūtra.

Though Hongren was known for not compiling writings and for teaching Zen principles orally, the classical Chan text Discourse on the Highest Vehicle, is attributed to him. This work emphasizes the practice of "maintaining the original true mind" that "naturally cuts off the arising of delusion."

== Split in Northern and Southern School ==
Originally Shenxiu was considered to be the "Sixth Patriarch", carrying the mantle of Bodhidharma's Zen through the East Mountain School. After the death of Shenxiu, Huineng's student Shenhui started a campaign to establish Huineng as the Sixth Ancestor. Eventually Shenhui's position won the day, and Huineng was recognized as the Sixth Patriarch.

The successful promulgation of Shenhui's views led to Shenxiu's branch being widely referred to by others as the "Northern School". This nomenclature has continued in western scholarship, which for the most part has largely viewed Chinese Chan/Zen through the lens of southern Chan.

=== Northern and Southern School (南頓北漸) ===
The terms Northern and Southern have little to do with geography:

Contrary to first impressions, the formula has little to do with geography. Like the general designations of Mahāyāna ("the universal vehicle") and Hīnayāna ("the individual vehicle"), the formula carries with it a value judgement. According to the mainstream of later Zen, not only is sudden enlightenment incomparably superior to gradual experience but it represents true Zen — indeed, it is the very touchstone of authentic Zen.

The basic difference is between approaches. Shenhui characterised the Northern School as employing gradual teachings, while his Southern school employed sudden teachings:

suddenness of the South, gradualness of the North" (Chinese: nan-tun bei qian; Japanese: nanton hokuzen).

The term "East Mountain Teaching" is seen as more culturally and historically appropriate.

But the characterization of Shenxiu's East Mountain Teaching as gradualist is argued to be unfounded in light of the documents found amongst Dunhuang manuscripts recovered from the Mogao Caves near Dunhuang. Shenhui's Southern School incorporated Northern teachings as well, and Shenhui himself admittedly saw the need of further practice after initial awakening.

=== Shenxiu (神秀, 606?-706 CE) ===
Yuquan Shenxiu's prominent position in the history of Chan, despite the popular narrative, is recognized by modern scholarship:

No doubt the most important personage within the Northern school is [Shenxiu], a man of high education and widespread notoriety.

Kuiken (undated: p. 17) in discussing a Dunhuang document of the Tang monk and meditator, 'Jingjue' (靜覺, 683- ca. 750) states:

Jingjue's Record introduces Hongren of Huangmei 黃梅宏忍 (d.u.) as the main teacher in the sixth generation of the 'southern' or 'East Mountain' meditation tradition. Shenxiu is mentioned as Hongren's authorized successor. In Shenxiu's shadow, Jingjue mentions 'old An' 老安 (see A) as a 'seasoned' meditation teacher and some minor 'local disciples' of Hongren.

Shenxiu wrote a treatise on meditation called the Kuan-hsin lun ("treatise on contemplating the mind"). It combines some of the meditation practices taught by Zhiyi with ideas from the Awakening of Faith in the Mahayana.

=== Hui-neng (六祖惠能 or 慧能大師) ===
The story of Huineng is famously worded in the Platform Sutra, a text which originated after Shenhui's death. Its core may have originated within the so-called Oxhead school. The text was subsequently edited and enlarged, and reflects various Chan teachings. Although the Southern School traces itself to Huineng, the Platform Sutra de-emphasizes the difference between the Northern and the Southern School.

The first chapter of the Platform Sutra relates the story of Huineng and his inheritance of the East Mountain Teachings.

== Wider influence of the East Mountain Teachings ==
The tradition of a list of patriarchs, which granted credibility to the developing tradition, developed early in the Chan tradition:

The consciousness of a unique line of transmission of Bodhidharma Zen, which is not yet demonstrable in the Bodhidharma treatise, grew during the seventh century and must have taken shape on the East Mountain prior to the death of the Fourth Patriarch Tao-hsin (580-651). The earliest indication appears in the epitaph for Faru (638-689), one of the '10 outstanding disciples' of the Fifth Patriarch Hongren (601-674). The author of the epitaph is not known, but the list comprises six names: after Bodhidharma and Huike follow Sengcan, Daoxin, Hongren, and Faru. The Ch'uan fa-pao chi takes this list over and adds as a seventh name that of Shen-hsiu (605?-706)

=== Faru (法如, 638-689 CE) ===
Faru (法如, 638-689) was "the first pioneer" and "actual founder" of the Northern School. His principal teachers were Hui-ming and Daman Hongren (Hung-jen). He was sent to Hongren by Hui-ming, and attained awakening when studying with Hung-jen

Originally Faru too was credited to be the successor of Hongren. But Faru did not have a good publicist, and he was not included within the list of Chan Patriarchs.

In an epitaph for Shenxiu, his name is made to take the place of Faru's. The Leng-ch'ieh shih-tzu chi omits Faru and ends after Shenxiu with the name of his disciple Puji (651-739). These indications from the Northern school argue for the succession of the Third Patriarch Sengcan (d. 606), which has been thrown into doubt because of lacunae in the historical work of Tao-hsuan. Still, the matter cannot be settled with certainty.

Because of Faru, the 'Shaolin Monastery', constructed in 496CE, yet again became prominent. [Faru] had only a brief stay at Shaolin Temple, but during his stay the cloister became the epicentre of the flourishing Chan movement. An epitaph commemorating the success of Faru's pioneering endeavors is located on Mount Sung.

=== Moheyan (late eighth century CE, 大乘和尚 or 摩訶衍) ===
Moheyan (late eighth century CE) was a proponent of the Northern School. However, as van Schaik observes, the exclusive association of Moheyan with the Northern School is problematic, as Moheyan may have actually counted the famous champion of Southern Chan, Shenhui, as one of his teachers; and texts containing Moheyan's teachings exhibit an attempt at harmonizing sudden and gradual aspects of practice.

Luis Gómez observes that while Moheyan's sectarian affiliations are unclear, he seems to have belonged to a late Northern branch which leaned strongly toward Southern Chan teachings. Gómez regards Moheyan as doctrinally closer to the sudden teaching of the Southern School than Northern gradualism. For Gómez, Moheyan's doctrinal stance is more important than his lineage affiliation, which he regards a matter of religious politics. There is also evidence that Moheyan had connections to the Baotang school. However, according to Gómez, the exclusive focus on "spiritual lineage" in the traditional sense overlooks that Moheyan was not trying to conform to a received doctrine. Gómez states rather that "he [Moheyan] was his own man, a moderately creative religious specialist who borrowed and innovated at will. The concepts of 'teacher' and 'lineage' serve a variety of ahistorical functions in his hagiography, as they do in that of so many other Buddhist masters—they are devices for recognizing or claiming inspiration, influence, and political and institutional allegiance."

Moheyan traveled to Dunhuang, which at the time belonged to the Ancient Tibetan Empire, in 781 or 787 CE.

Moheyan participated in a prolonged debate with Kamalashila at Samye in Tibet over sudden versus gradual teachings, which was decisive for the course the Tibetan Buddhist tradition took:

As is well known, the fate of Chan [East Mountain Teachings] in Tibet was said to have been decided in a debate at the Samye monastery near Lhasa in c.792-797.

Broughton identifies the Chinese and Tibetan nomenclature of Mohoyen's teachings and identifies them principally with the East Mountain Teachings:

Mo-ho-yen's teaching in Tibet as the famed proponent of the all-at-once gate can be summarized as "gazing-at-mind" ([Chinese:] k'an-hsin, [Tibetan:] sems la bltas) and "no examining" ([Chinese:] pu-kuan, [Tibetan:] myi rtog pa) or "no-thought no-examining" ([Chinese:] pu-ssu pu-kuan, [Tibetan:] myi bsam myi rtog). "Gazing-at-mind" is an original Northern (or East Mountain Dharma Gate) teaching. As will become clear, Poa-t'ang and the Northern Ch'an dovetail in the Tibetan sources. Mo-ho-yen's teaching seems typical of late Northern Ch'an.

The teachings of Moheyan and other Chan masters were unified with the Kham Dzogchen lineages {this may or may not be congruent with the Kahma (Tibetan: bka' ma) lineages} through the Kunkhyen (Tibetan for "omniscient"), Rongzom Chokyi Zangpo.

The Dzogchen ("Great Perfection") School of the Nyingmapa was often identified with the 'sudden enlightenment' (Tibetan: cig car gyi ‘jug pa) of Moheyan and was called to defend itself against this charge by avowed members of the Sarma lineages that held to the staunch view of 'gradual enlightenment' (Tibetan: rim gyis ‘jug pa).

== See also ==
- Rongzom Chokyi Zangpo
- Yuquan Shenxiu
- Mount Wutai

== Sources ==
- Ferguson, Andy (2000), Zen's Chinese Heritage, Boston: Wisdom Publications Boston, ISBN 0-86171-163-7
- Bielefeldt, carl (1986), "Ch 'ang-lu Tsung-tse's Tso-Ch'an I and the "secret" of Zen Meditation", in Gregory, Peter N. (ed.), Traditions of Meditation in Chinese Buddhism, University of Hawai'i Press
- Kasulis, Thomas P. (2003), Ch'an Spirituality. In: Buddhist Spirituality. Later China, Korea, Japan and the Modern World; edited by Takeuchi Yoshinori, Delhi: Motilal Banarsidass
- Lai, Whalen (2003), Buddhism in China: A Historical Survey. In Antonio S. Cua (ed.): Encyclopedia of Chinese Philosophy (PDF), New York: Routledge, archived from the original (PDF) on November 12, 2014
- McRae, John (1991), Shen-hui and the Teaching of Sudden Enlightenment in Early Ch'an Buddhism. In: Peter N. Gregory (editor)(1991), Sudden and Gradual. Approaches to Enlightenment in Chinese Thought, Delhi: Motilal Banarsidass Publishers Private Limited
- McRae, John (2003), Seeing Through Zen, The University Press Group Ltd
