= Nanhai Guanyin Temple =

Buddhist temple in Foshan, China

- 南海观音寺
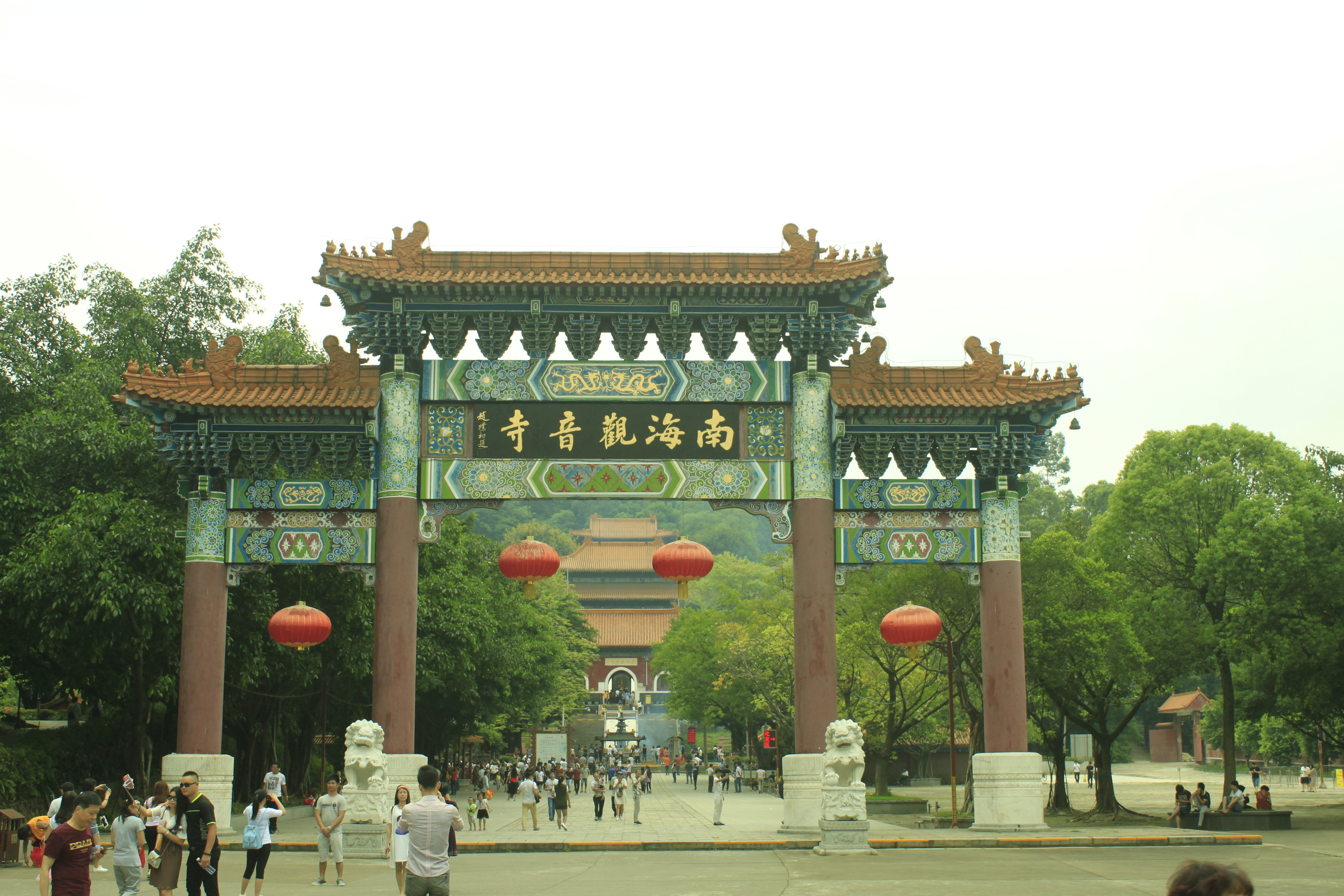
- The paifang of Nanhai Guanyin Temple.

- Location within Guangdong Location within China

Religion
- Affiliation: Buddhism
- Sect: Chan Buddhism
- District: Nanhai District
- Prefecture: Foshan
- Province: Guangdong

Location
- Country: China
- Interactive map of Nanhai Guanyin Temple
- Prefecture: Foshan
- Coordinates: 23°10′53″N 113°06′55″E

Architecture
- Established: 990
- Completed: 1996 (reconstruction)

Nanhai Guanyin Temple (simplified Chinese: 南海观音寺; traditional Chinese: 南海觀音寺; pinyin: Nánhaǐ Guānyīn Sì) is a Buddhist temple located at the foot of Niugugang (牛牯崗), in Nanhai District of Foshan, Guangdong, China.

== History ==
Nanhai Guanyin Temple was built in the 5th year of Period Chunhua (990) in the Northern Song dynasty (960-1127). At that time it bore the name Nanhai Guanyin Palace (Chinese: 南海观音庙). The temple was enlarged burned, and rededicated several times throughout Chinese history till now, the present version was completed in 1996. On February 12, 1996, the temple was officially opened to the public. On December 29, 1996, abbot Shi Xincheng (Chinese: 释新成) held the canonization ceremony of the newly reconstruction temple. The then Venerable Master of the Chinese Buddhists Association Zhao Puchu inscribed a plaque "Nanhai Guanyin Temple" (Chinese: 南海观音寺) for the temple.

== Architecture ==
Along the central axis are the Paifang, Tianwang-dian ("Hall of the Four Heavenly Kings"), Mahavira Hall and Guanyin-dian ("Hall of Guanyin"). There are over 20 halls and rooms on both sides, including Bell Tower, Drum Tower, Liuzu-dian ("Hall of the Sixth Patriarch"), Abbot Hall, Monastic Dining Hall, Monastic Reception Hall and Meditation Hall. Among these, the Guanyin-dian is the main hall to enshrine Guanyin Bodhisattva.

== Gallery ==
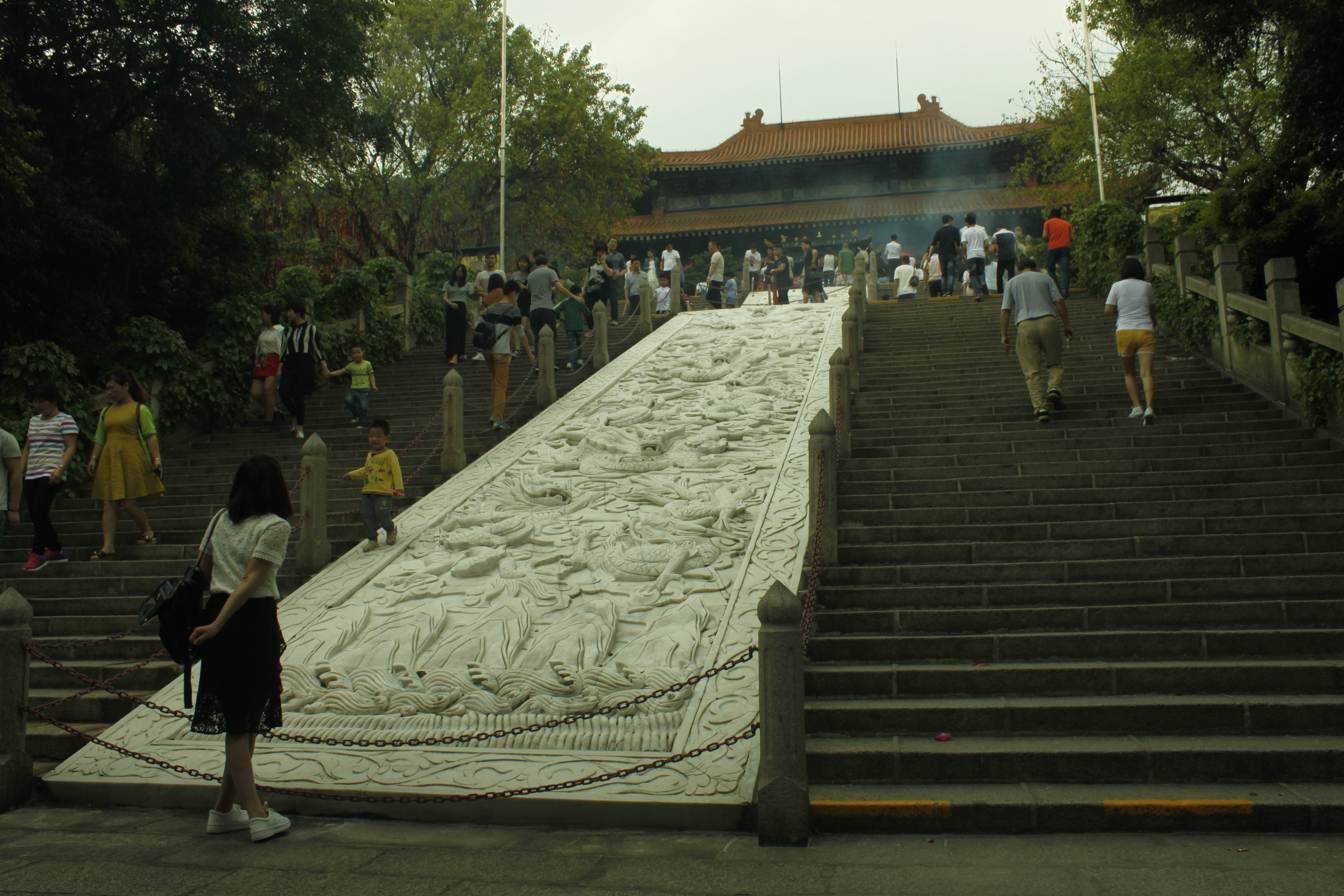
The Mahavira Hall.

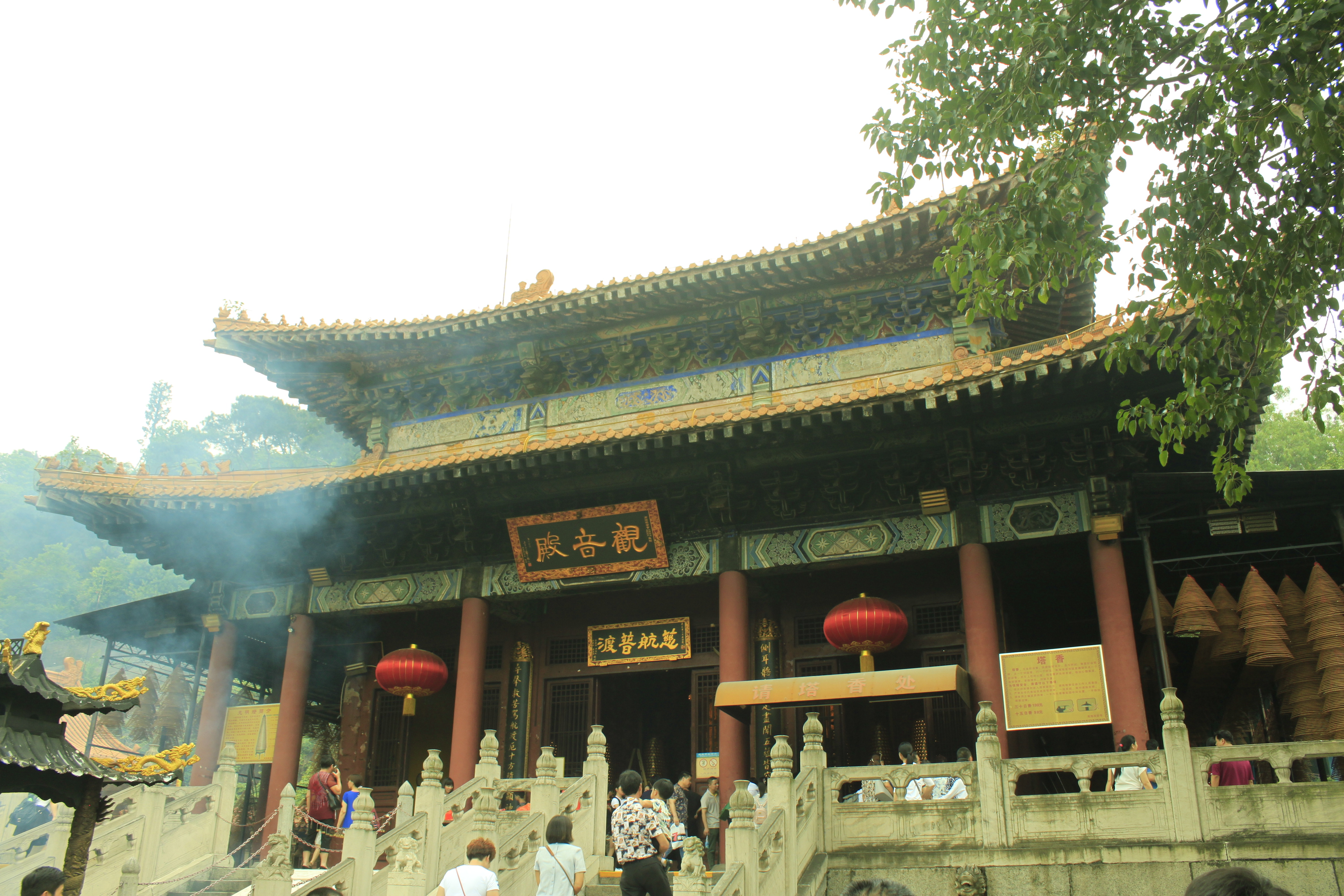
The Guanyin-dian.

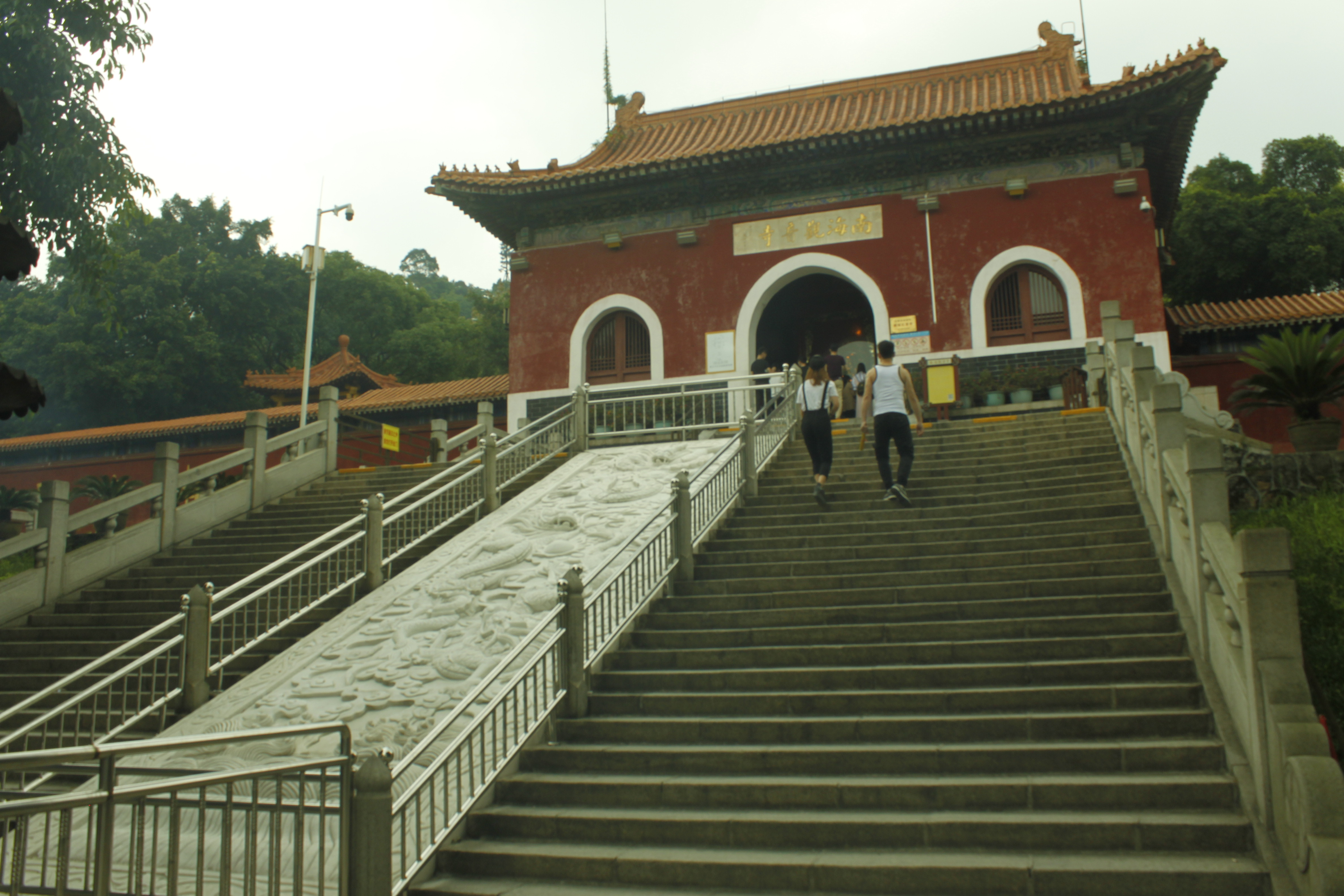
The Shanmen

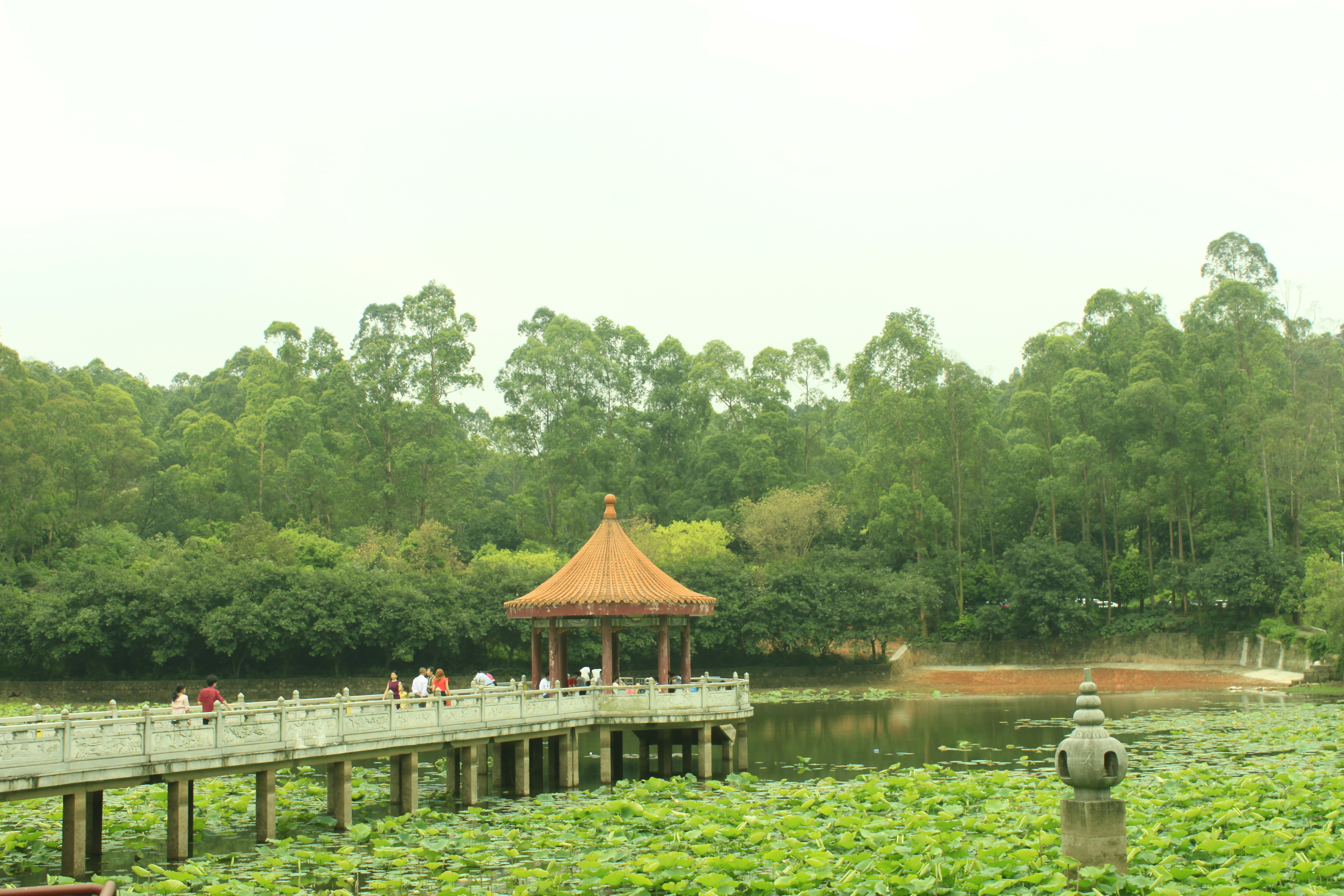
The Free Life Pond.

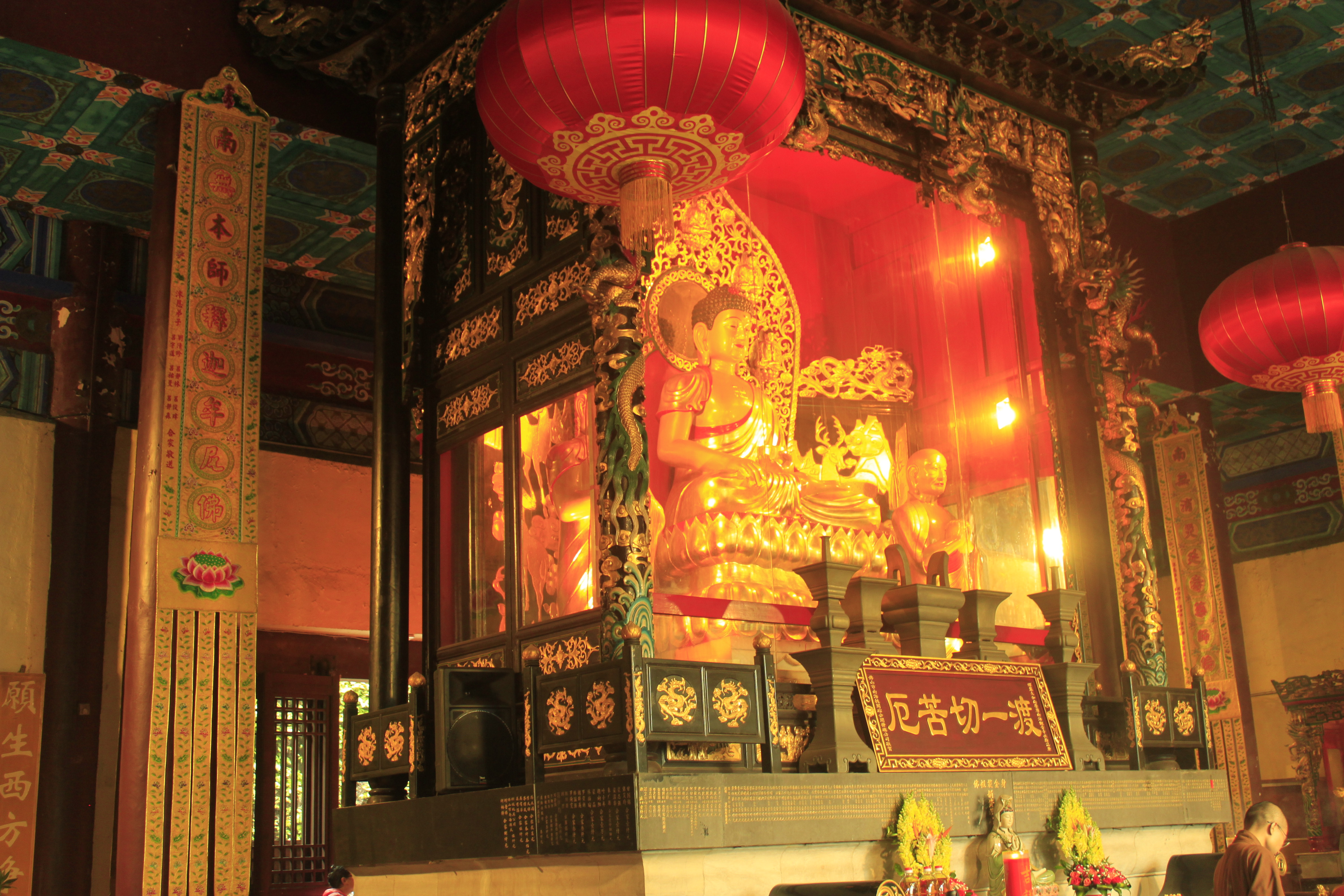
The Buddha Shijiamouni at the Mahavira Hall.

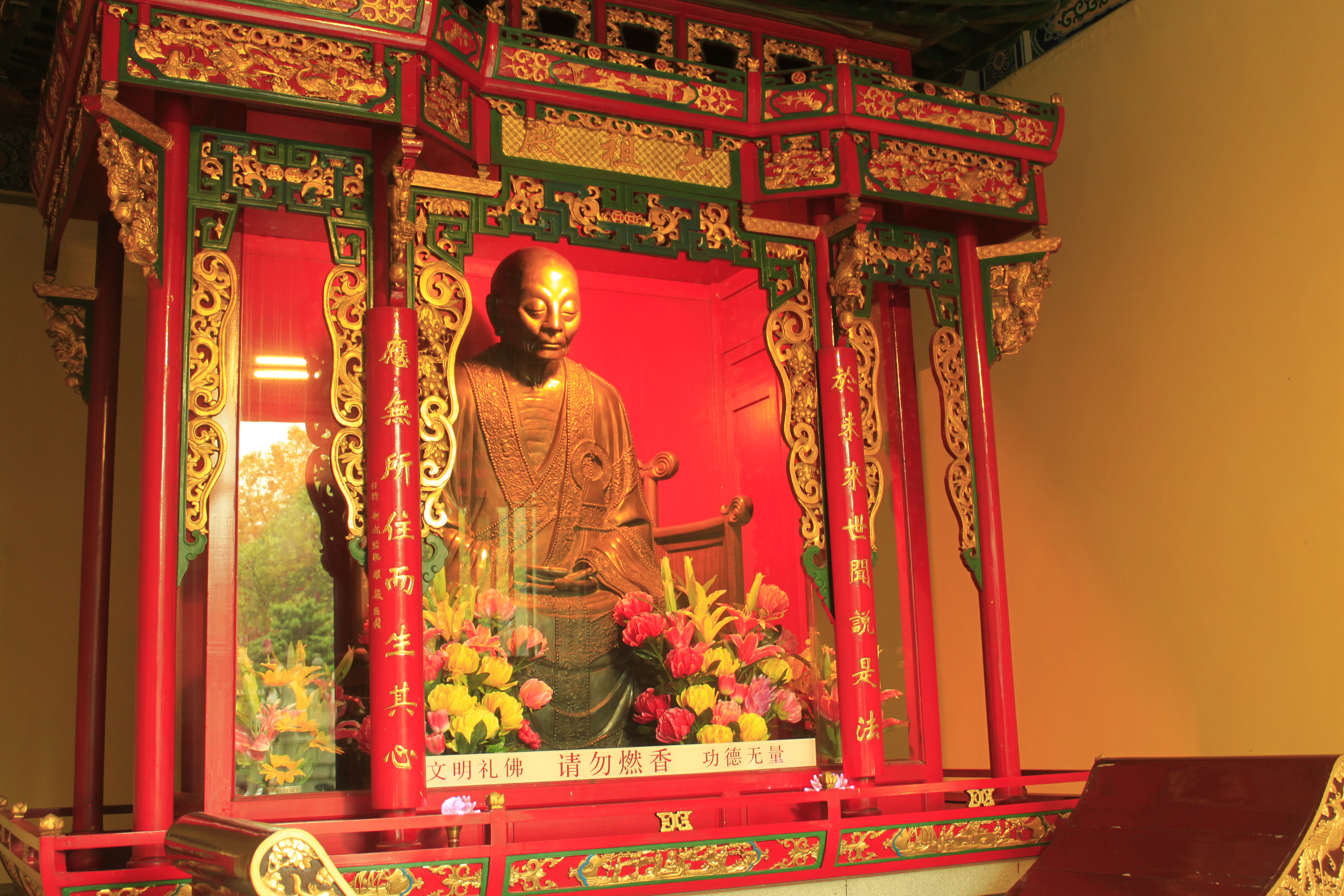
The Sixth Patriarch Huineng at the Liuzu-dian.

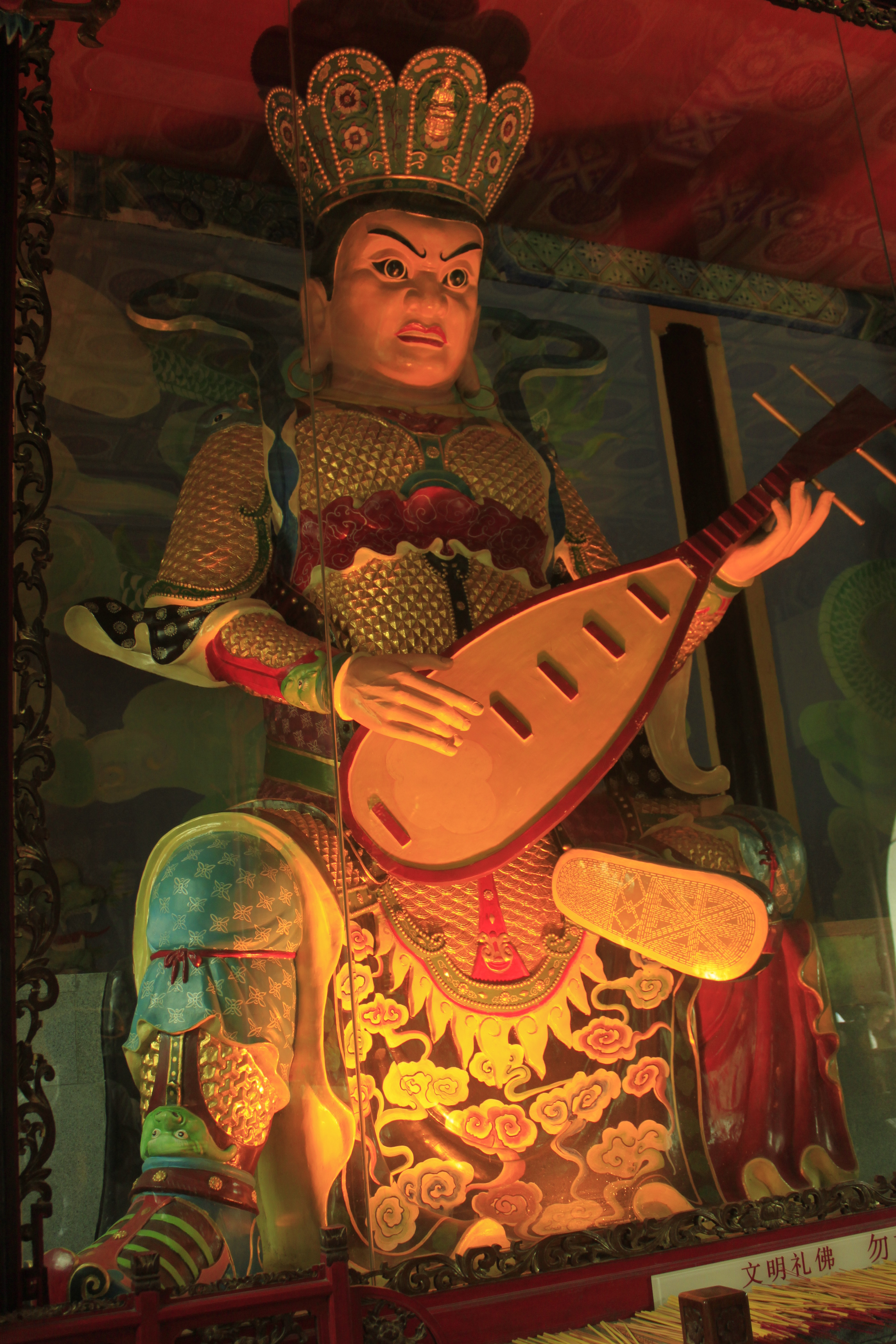
The Dhrtarastra at the Hall of Four Heavenly Kings.

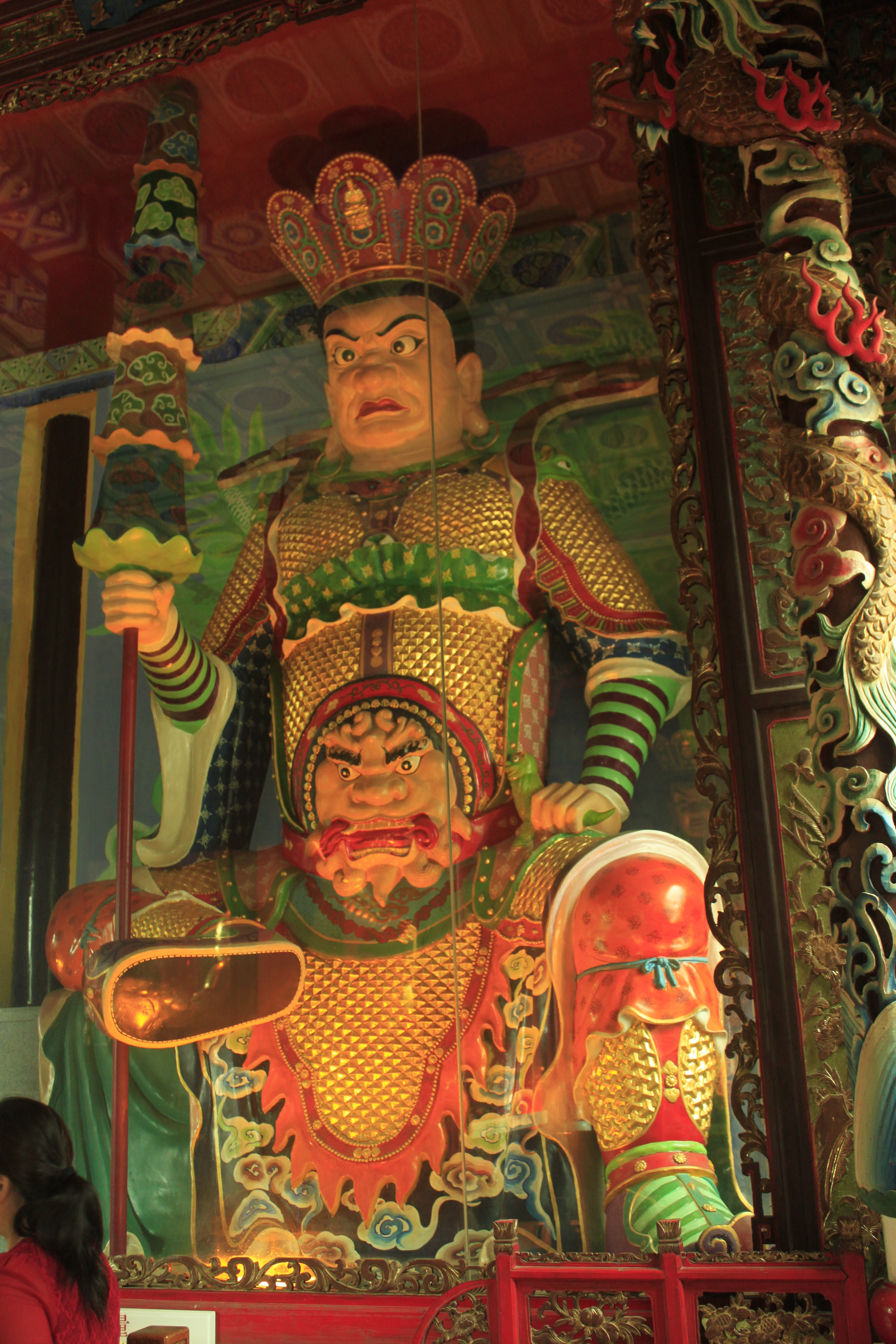
The Vaisravana at the Hall of Four Heavenly Kings.

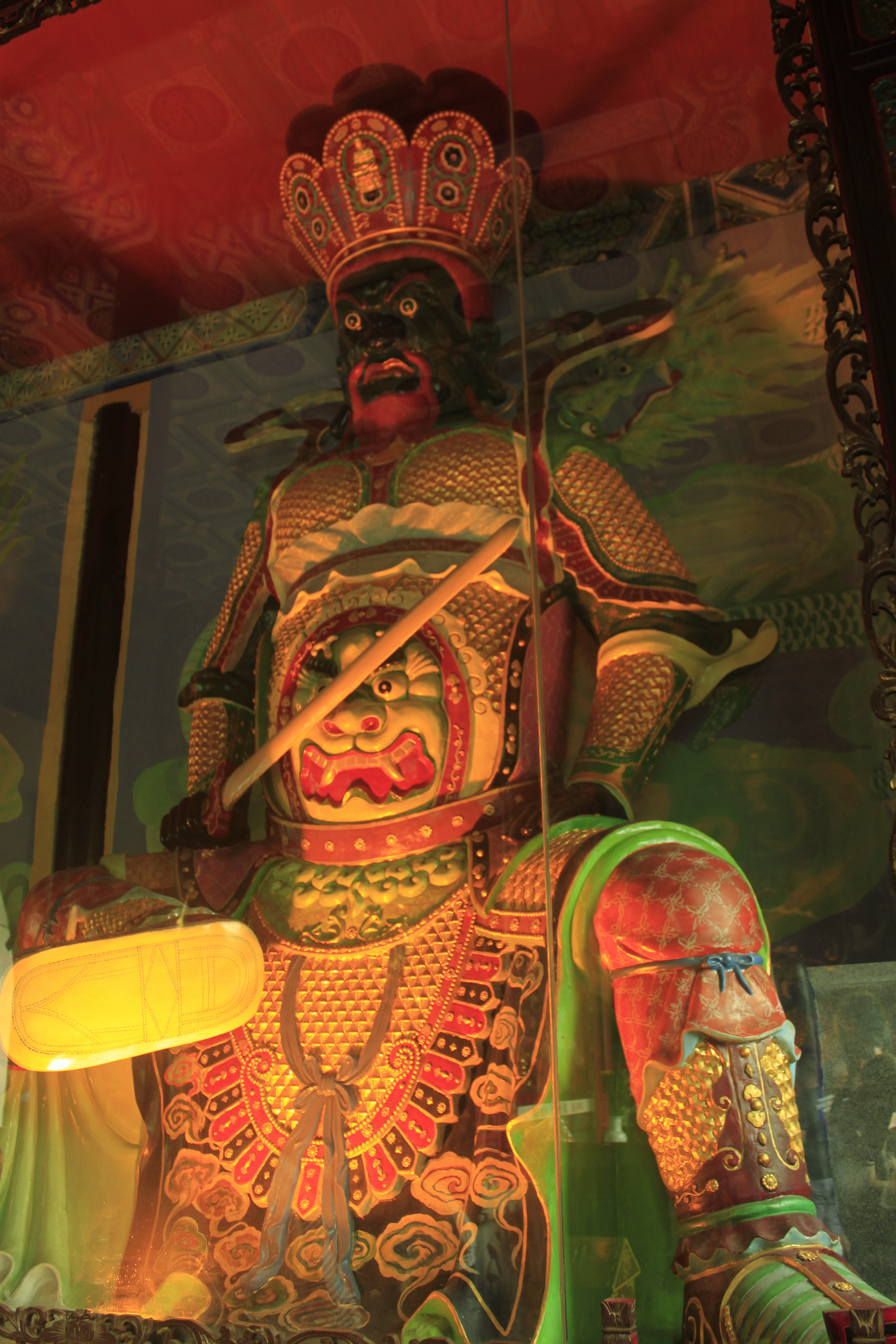
The Virudhaka at the Hall of Four Heavenly Kings.

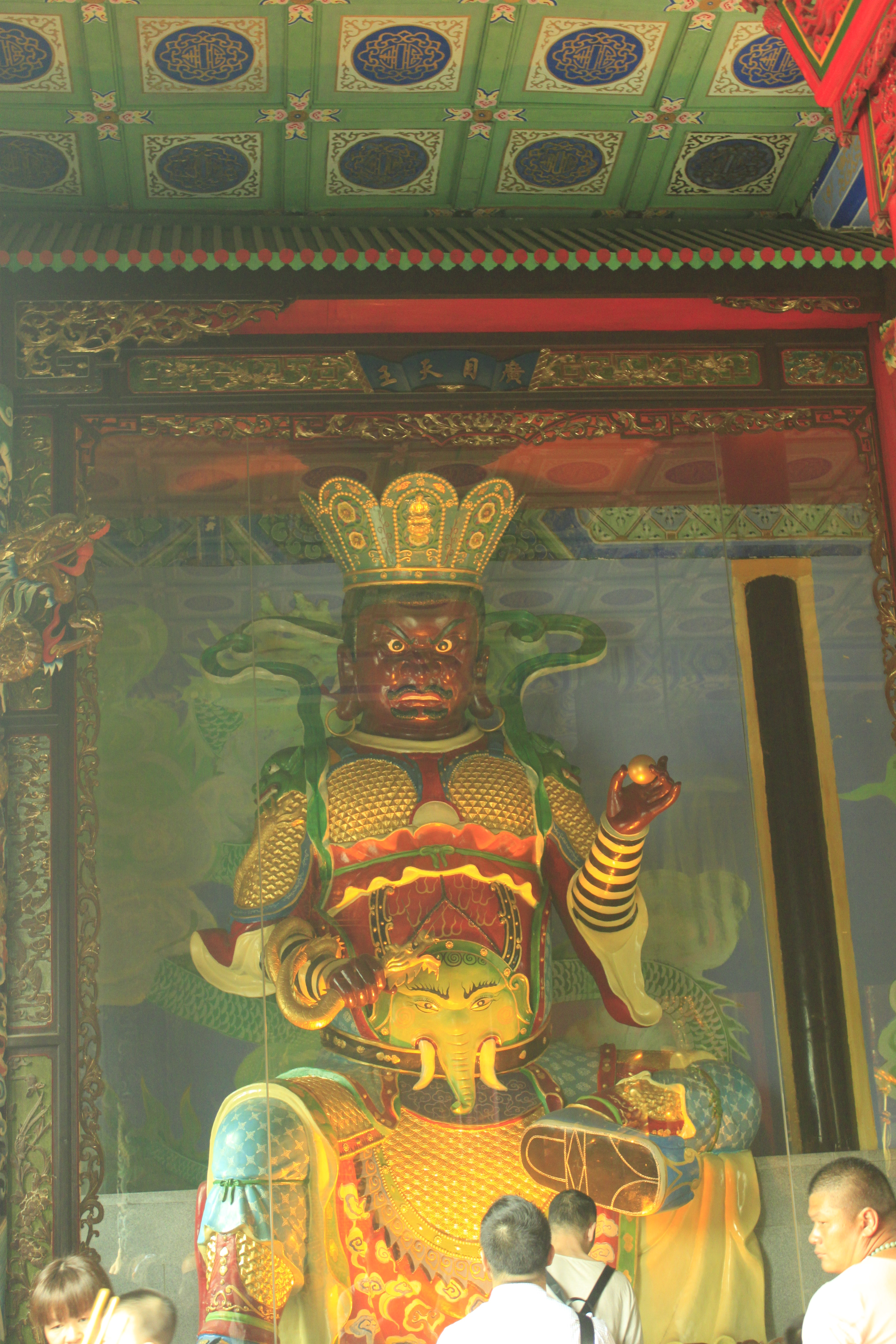
The Virupaksa at the Hall of Four Heavenly Kings.
