= Philip Yampolsky =

Buddhist scholar (1920–1996)

Philip Boas Yampolsky (October 20, 1920 – July 28, 1996) was an eminent translator and scholar of Zen Buddhism and a former director of the C. V. Starr East Asian Library of Columbia University. A scholar of Chinese and Japanese religious traditions and a specialist in Zen studies, Yampolsky was known for his translations of canonical Zen writings, which were used as textbooks in both graduate and undergraduate Asian studies courses in American universities. His style was regarded as highly analytical.

== Biography ==
Yampolsky was born in New York City on October 20, 1920, and was one of a pair of identical twins (his brother, Robert, died in 1987). His grandfather Franz Boas was an anthropologist who founded Columbia's Department of Anthropology. Yampolsky took his secondary education at the Horace Mann School and graduated with his undergraduate degree in 1942 from Columbia College. He joined the United States Navy that year in the midst of World War II, which the United States had entered following the Japanese attack on Pearl Harbor in December 1941. Yampolsky studied Japanese, training as a translator in an elite group at the U.S. Navy Japanese Language School in Boulder, Colorado. He rose to the rank of lieutenant and fought in the Battle of Iwo Jima. He served under the Navy's Joint Intelligence Center. Yampolsky was awarded the Bronze Star, being cited for his "meritorious service as a translator".

In the late 1940s on invitation from the Library of Congress, he joined Columbia Librarian Miwa Kai to help catalogue seized Japanese books acquired by the library from the Washington Document Center.

In 1954 he was awarded a Fulbright scholarship to work on his dissertation on Huineng in Kyoto, Japan, where he lived for the following eight years. The Fulbright scholarship supported him for two years; then, after a year on his own, he was employed by Ruth Fuller Sasaki as an active member of a group of scholars and writers who studied Zen, including scholar Burton Watson, poet Gary Snyder and Japanese academics Seizan Yanagida and Yoshitaka Iriya. They worked on influential texts such as The Record of Lin-Chi and Zen Dust, which helped to popularise Zen in the English speaking world. In the summer of 1957, through his friendship with Snyder, he met Kyoto Women's University student Yuiko Takeda, who became Yampolsky's wife the following year.

Yampolsky returned to the United States in 1962 to pursue further study at Columbia. He joined the staff of the East Asian Library and completed his Ph.D. in 1965.

In 1968, Yampolsky was appointed to the post of librarian of Columbia's East Asian Library, which was known as the C. V. Starr East Asian Library. It is one of the major such collections in the United States, with more than 600,000 items in Japanese, Chinese, Korean, among others. Yampolsky remained in this position until 1981.

Yampolsky was promoted to a full professorship of Japanese in 1981. He retired in 1990 but continued as a special lecturer until 1994. Upon his retirement, he was awarded the Buddhist Studies Senior Scholar Award, created in his honor with gifts, mainly from Japan, through the Institute for Medieval Japanese Studies, recognising his teaching and research career.

He died on July 28, 1996, at St. Luke's Hospital in New York City at the age of 75. Yampolsky was survived by his wife, Yuiko, and their two children: Ruri and Robert. He had a daughter, Susan, from a previous marriage and left six grandchildren and three great-grandchildren.

== Translations ==
Yampolsky's translations included the Platform Sutra of the Sixth Patriarch (1967) and The Zen Master Hakuin: Selected Writings (1971), both published by Columbia University Press. Yampolsky's last books before his death, Selected Writings of Nichiren and Letters of Nichiren, translated and elucidated the writings of the 13th century Buddhist intellectual and reformer whose thoughts inspired religious and political movements that remain active in Japan to this day. These books were published by Columbia University Press in 1990 and 1996.

== See also ==
- Steven Heine
