= Huineng =

Semi-legendary Tang dynasty Chinese Chan Buddhist master (trad. 638-713)

Dajian Huineng
- Chinese: 惠能
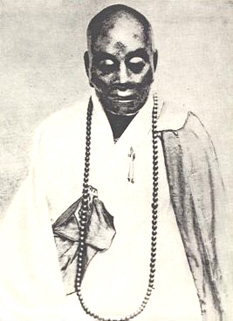
- Putative mummy of Huineng's body

Personal life
- Born: trad. 638 Xinxing County, Guangdong, China
- Died: 713 (aged 74–75) Guo'en Temple, Xinxing County, Guangdong, China
- Notable work: Platform Sutra of the Sixth Patriarch
- Posthumous name: Dajian (大鑒)

Religious life
- Religion: Chan Buddhism
- Temple: Guangxiao Temple; Nanhua Temple
- Dharma name: Huineng (惠能)

Senior posting
- Teacher: Daman Hongren
- Students: Qingyuan Xingsi Shitou Xiqian Nanyue Huairang

Dajian Huineng or Hui-neng (traditional Chinese: 大鑒惠能; pinyin: Dàjiàn Huìnéng; Cantonese Jyutping: daai6 gaam3 wai6 nang4; Wade–Giles: Ta⁴-chien⁴ Hui⁴-nêng²; Japanese: Daikan Enō; Korean: Daegam Hyeneung; trad. 638-713), also commonly known as the Sixth Patriarch or Sixth Ancestor of Chan (Chinese: 禪宗六祖), is a semi-legendary but central figure in the early history of Chinese Chan Buddhism.

According to tradition Huineng was an uneducated layman who suddenly attained awakening (見性; jianxing) upon hearing the Diamond Sutra. Despite his lack of formal training, he demonstrated his understanding to the fifth patriarch, Daman Hongren, who then supposedly chose Huineng as his true successor instead of his publicly known selection of Yuquan Shenxiu. Huineng is regarded as the founder of the "Sudden Enlightenment" Southern Chan school of Buddhism, which focuses on an immediate and direct attainment of Buddhist enlightenment. The Platform Sutra of the Sixth Patriarch (六祖壇經), which is said to be a record of his teachings, is a highly influential text in the East Asian Buddhist tradition.

20th century scholarship revealed that the story of Huineng's Buddhist career was likely invented by the monk Shenhui, who claimed to be one of Huineng's disciples and was highly critical of Shenxiu's teaching.

== Biography ==
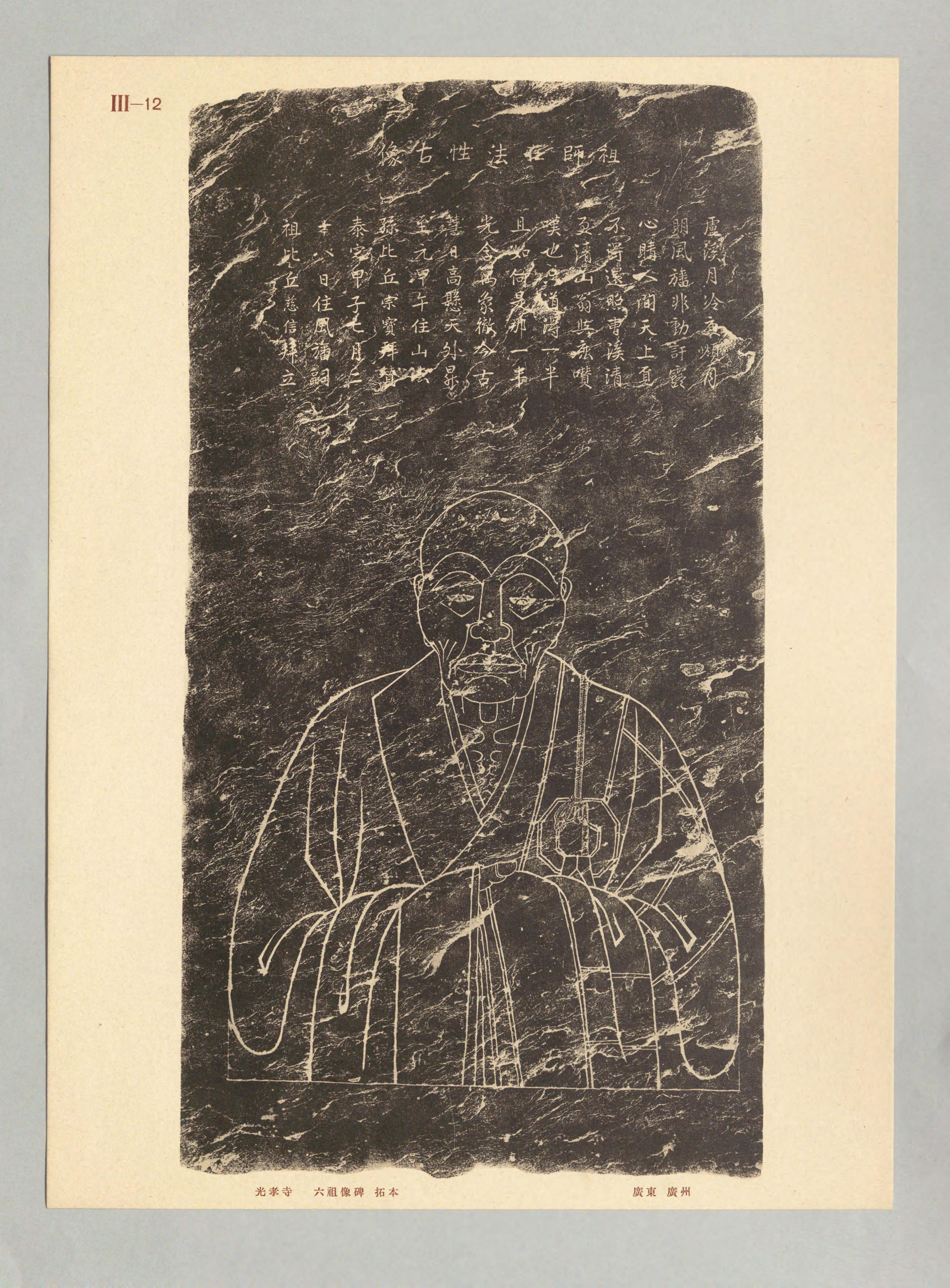
Illustration of Huineng from a stele at Guangxiao Temple (Guangzhou)

=== Sources ===
The two primary sources for Huineng's life are the preface to the Platform Sutra and the Transmission of the Lamp. Most modern scholars doubt the historicity of traditional biographies and works written about Huineng, considering his extended biography to be a legendary narrative based on a historical person of "merely regional significance", of whom very little is known. (Note: John M. Thompson, Huineng (Hui-neng), Internet Encyclopedia of Philosophy) This legendary narrative reflects historical and religious developments which took place in the century after his life and death.

=== The Platform Sutra ===
The Platform Sūtra of the Sixth Patriarch is attributed to a disciple of Huineng named Fahai, and purports to be a record of Huineng's life, lectures and interactions with disciples. However, the text shows signs of having been constructed over a longer period of time, and contains different layers of writing. According to John McRae, it is

...a wonderful melange of early Chan teachings, a virtual repository of the entire tradition up to the second half of the eighth century. At the heart of the sermon is the same understanding of the Buddha-nature that we have seen in texts attributed to Bodhidharma and Hongren, including the idea that the fundamental Buddha-nature is only made invisible to ordinary humans by their illusions.

According to Wong, the Platform Sūtra cites and explains a wide range of Buddhist scriptures listed here in the order of appearance:

- Diamond Sutra
- Laṅkāvatāra Sūtra
- Mahāparinirvāṇa Sūtra
- Mahāprajñāpāramitā Sūtra
- Brahmajāla Sūtra
- Vimalakirti Sutra
- Lotus Sutra
- Śūraṅgama Sūtra
- Awakening of Faith in the Mahayana

=== Early life and introduction to Buddhism ===
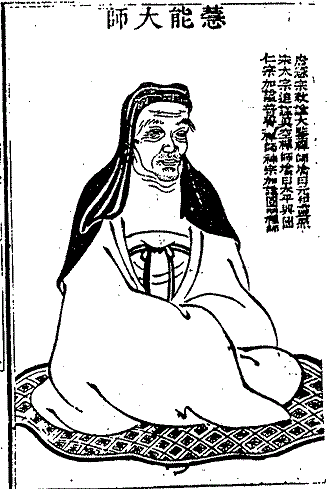
Chinese illustration of Huineng

According to Huineng's autobiography in the Platform Sutra, Huineng's father was from Fanyang, but he was banished from his government position and died at a young age. Huineng and his mother were left in poverty and moved to Nanhai, where Huineng sold firewood to support his family. One day, Huineng delivered firewood to a customer's shop, where he saw a man reciting the Diamond Sutra: "On my way out of the gate I saw someone reciting a sutra, and as soon as I heard the words of the sutra my mind opened forth in enlightenment." He inquired about the reason that the Diamond Sutra was chanted, and the person stated that he came from the Eastern Meditation Monastery in Huangmei District of the province of Qi, where the Fifth Patriarch of Chan lived and delivered his teachings. Huineng's customer paid his ten silver taels and suggested that he meet the Fifth Patriarch of Chan.

=== Meeting the Fifth Patriarch of Chan Buddhism ===
Huineng reached Huangmei thirty days later, and expressed to the Fifth Patriarch his specific request of attaining Buddhahood. Since Huineng came from Guangdong and was physically distinctive from the local Northern Chinese, the Fifth Patriarch Hongren questioned his origin as a "barbarian from the south", and doubted his ability to attain enlightenment. Huineng impressed Hongren with a clear understanding of the ubiquitous Buddha nature in everyone, and convinced Hongren to let him stay. The first chapter of the Ming canon version of the Platform Sutra describes the introduction of Huineng to Hongren as follows:

The Patriarch asked me, "Who are you and what do you seek ?"
I replied, "Your disciple is a commoner from Xinzhou of Lingnan. I have travelled far to pay homage to you and seek nothing other than Buddhahood."
"So you're from Ling-nan, and a barbarian! How can you expect to become a Buddha?" asked the Patriarch.
I replied, "Although people exist as northerners and southerners, in the Buddha-nature there is neither north nor south. A barbarian differs from Your Holiness physically, but what difference is there in our Buddha-nature?

Huineng was told to split firewood and pound rice in the backyard of the monastery and avoid going to the main hall.

=== Poem contest ===
Eight months later, the Fifth Patriarch summoned all his followers and proposed a poem contest for his followers to demonstrate the stage of their understanding of the essence of mind. He decided to pass down his robe and teachings to the winner of the contest, who would become the Sixth Patriarch. Shenxiu, the leading disciple of the Fifth Patriarch, composed a stanza, but did not have the courage to present it to the master. Instead, he wrote his stanza on the south corridor wall one day at midnight to remain anonymous. The other monks saw the stanza and commended it. Shenxiu's stanza is as follows:

The body is the bodhi tree.
The mind is like a bright mirror's stand.
At all times we must strive to polish it
and must not let dust collect. (Note: Addiss, Lombardo, and Roitman give a somewhat different translation: The body is the tree of enlightenment, The mind is like a bright mirror’s stand; Time after time polish it diligently, So that no dust can collect.)

The Patriarch was not satisfied with Shenxiu's stanza, and pointed out that the poem did not show understanding of "[his] own fundamental nature and essence of mind." He gave Shenxiu a chance to submit another poem to demonstrate that he had entered the "gate of enlightenment," so that he could transmit his robe and the Dharma to Shenxiu, but the student's mind was agitated and could not write one more stanza.

Two days later, the illiterate Huineng heard Shenxiu's stanza being chanted by a young attendant at the monastery and inquired about the context of the poem. The attendant explained to him the poem contest and the transmission of the robe and Dharma. Huineng asked to be led to the corridor, where he could also pay homage to the stanza. He asked a low-ranking official named Zhang Riyong from Jiangzhou to read the verse to him, and then immediately asked him to write down a stanza that he composed.

According to McRae, "the earliest version of the Platform Sutra contains two versions of Huineng's verse." Later versions, such as the Zongbao edition (c. 1291) from the Yuan era, contain one version of Huineng's stanza, somewhat different from the two verses found in the c. 8th century Dunhuang edition:

Dunhuang text:
Bodhi originally has no tree.
The mirror has no stand.
The Buddha-nature is always clear and pure.
Where is there room for dust? (Note: Addiss, Lombardo, and Roitman give the following translation: Enlightenment is not a tree, The bright mirror has no stand; Originally there is not one thing- What place could there be for dust?)

Dunhuang text:
The mind is the bodhi tree.
The body is the bright mirror's stand.
The bright mirror is originally clear and pure.
Where could there be any dust?

Yuan dynasty text:
Bodhi originally has no tree.
The bright mirror also has no stand.
Fundamentally there is not a single thing.
Where could dust arise?

The followers who were present were astonished by the work of a southern barbarian. Being cautious of Huineng's status, the Patriarch wiped away the stanza and claimed that the author of the stanza had not reached enlightenment.

=== Interpretation of the verses ===
According to the traditional interpretation, which is based on Guifeng Zongmi, the fifth-generation successor of Shenhui, the two verses represent respectively the gradual and the sudden approach. According to McRae, this is an incorrect understanding:

[T]he verse attributed to Shenxiu does not in fact refer to gradual or progressive endeavor, but to a constant practice of cleaning the mirror [...] [H]is basic message was that of the constant and perfect teaching, the endless personal manifestation of the bodhisattva ideal.

Huineng's verse does not stand alone, but forms a pair with Shenxiu's verse:

Huineng's verse(s) apply the rhetoric of emptiness to undercut the substantiality of the terms of that formulation. However, the basic meaning of the first proposition still remains.

McRae notes a similarity in reasoning with the Oxhead School, which used a threefold structure of "absolute, relative and middle", or "thesis-antithesis-synthesis". According to McRae, the Platform Sutra itself is the synthesis in this threefold structure, giving a balance between the need of constant practice and the insight into the absolute.

=== Succession of Hongren ===
However, on the next day, the Patriarch secretly went to Huineng's room and asked, "Should not a seeker after the Dharma risk his life this way?" Then he asked, "is the rice ready?" Huineng responded that the rice was ready and only waiting to be sieved. The Patriarch secretly explained the Diamond Sutra to Huineng, and when Huineng heard the phrase "one should activate one's mind so it has no attachment," he was "suddenly and completely enlightened, and understood that all things exist in self-nature."

The Dharma was passed to Huineng at night, when the Patriarch transmitted "the doctrine of sudden enlightenment" as well as his robe and bowl to Huineng. He told Huineng, "You are now the Sixth Patriarch. Take care of yourself, save as many sentient beings as you can, and spread the teachings so they will not be lost in the future."

=== Escape from monastery ===
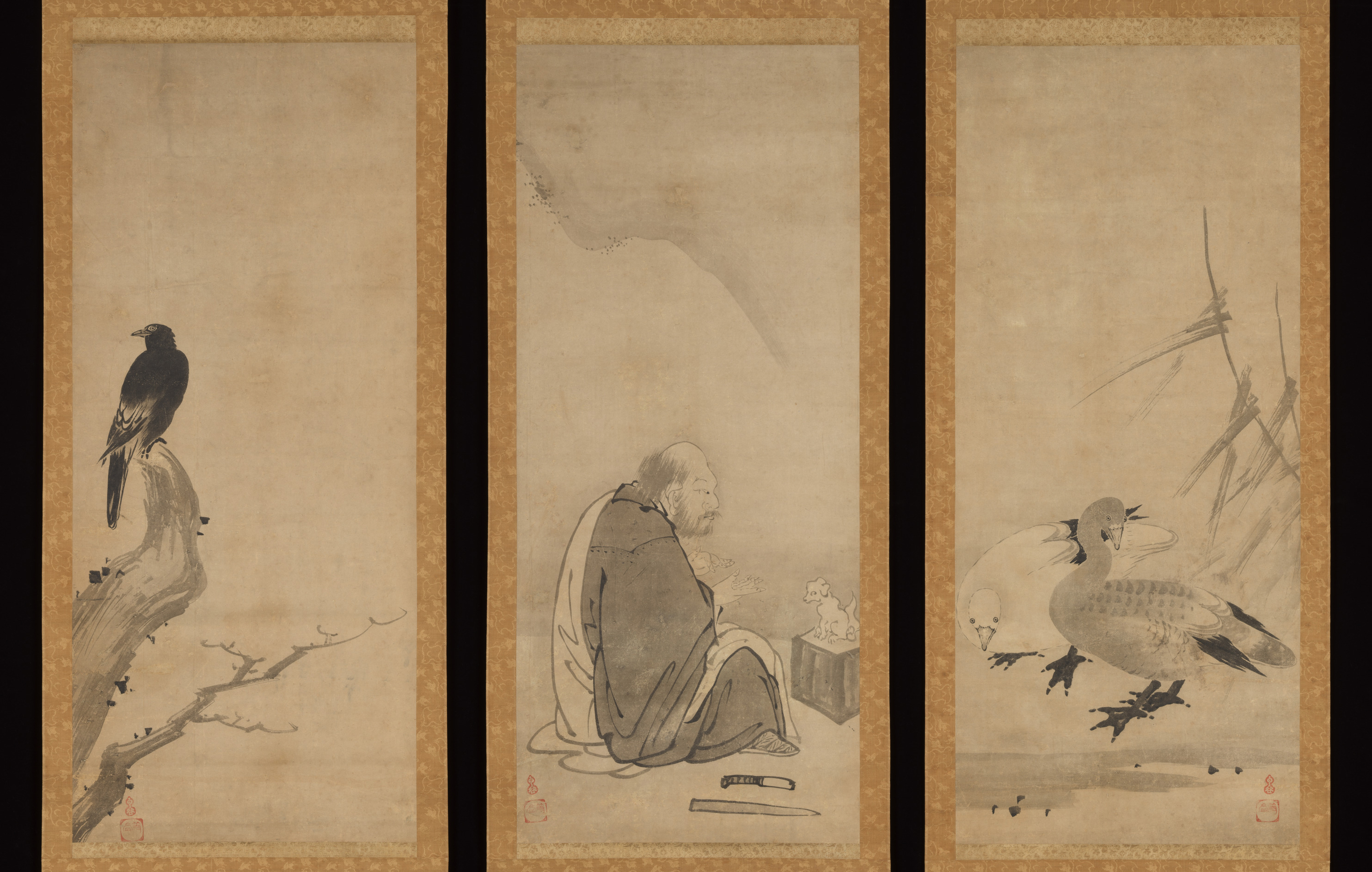
Huineng with Geese and Myna, by Unkoku Tōeki

He also explained to Huineng that the Dharma was transmitted from mind to mind, whereas the robe was passed down physically from one patriarch to the next. Hongren instructed the Sixth Patriarch to leave the monastery before he could be harmed. "You can stop at Huai and then hide yourself at Hui." Hongren showed Huineng the route to leave the monastery, and rowed Huineng across the river to assist his escape. Huineng immediately responded with a clear understanding of Hongren's purpose in doing so, and demonstrated that he could ferry to "the other shore" with the Dharma that had been transmitted to him.

The Sixth Patriarch reached the Tayu Mountains within two months, and realized that hundreds of men were following him, attempting to rob him of the robe and bowl. However, the robe and bowl could not be moved by Huiming, who then asked for the transmission of Dharma from Huineng. Huineng helped him reach enlightenment and continued on his journey.

== Teachings ==
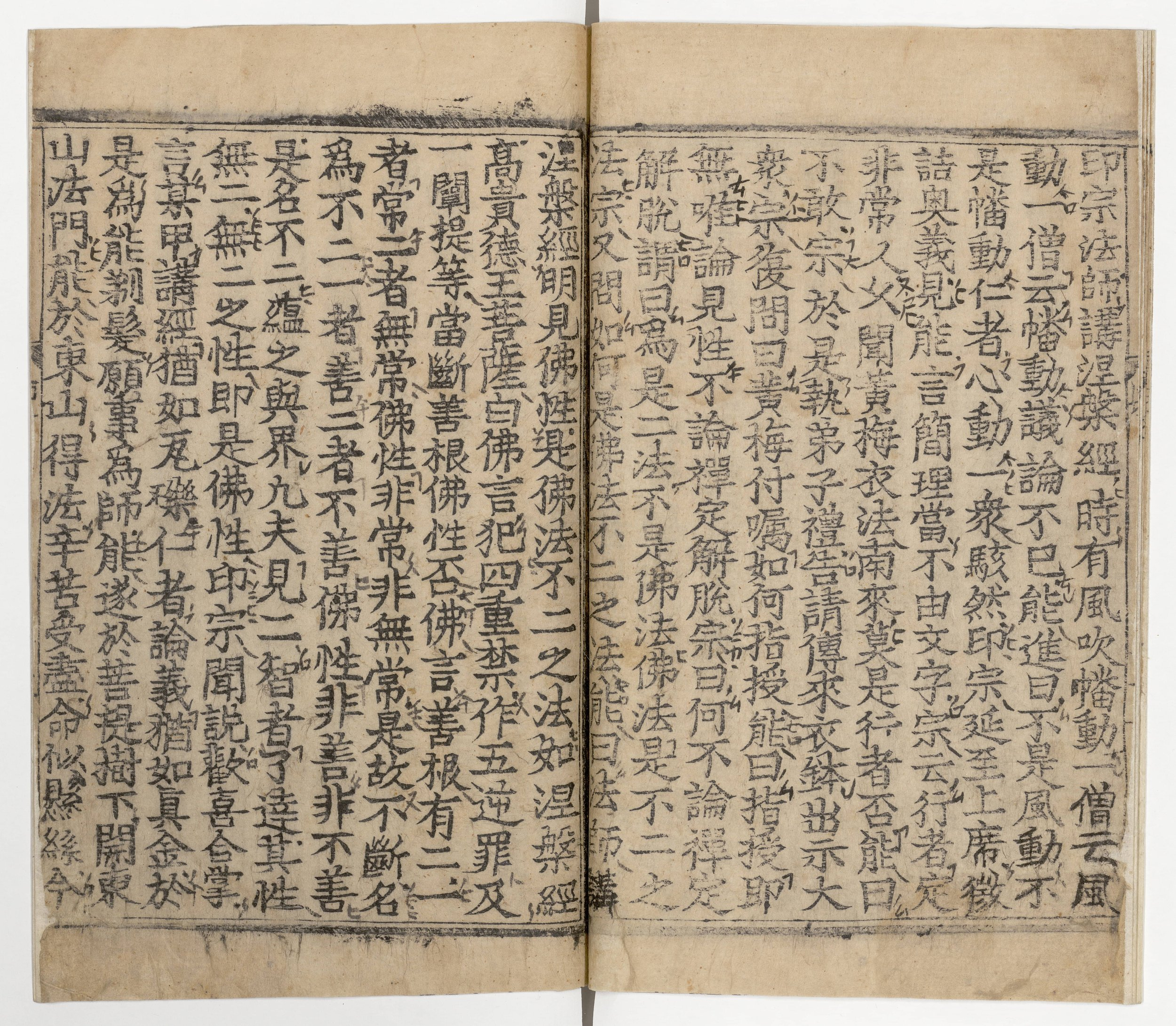
Double page from the Korean print of The Sixth Patriarch's Dharma Jewel Platform Sutra

The earliest and most important source for the teachings of Huineng is the Platform Sutra of the Sixth Patriarch (六祖壇經; Liùzǔ Tánjīng). There are various editions of this text, the earliest of which are copies from Dunhuang which date to the 9th century. The original may have been composed in around 780 CE. According to modern scholars like Yanagida Seizan and John McRae, the early Platform Sutra was composed within the Oxhead school, not within the so called "Southern School" as was previously believed. The text continued to be edited and expanded until the Yuan dynasty (1271–1368), when Zongbao (宗寶) produced an edition that eventually became part of the standard Ming Dynasty (1368-1644) Chinese Buddhist canon.

=== Non-thought, non-attribute, and non-abiding ===
According to Peter Gregory, the most important ideas in the Platform Sutra, for which it is best known, form a set of three key interrelated doctrines: no-thought (wunian), nonform, also translated as nonattribute (wuxiang), and nonabiding (wuzhu).

In the Platform Sutra, Huineng taught "no-thought," the "pure and unattached mind" which "comes and goes freely and functions fluently without any hindrance." It does not mean that one does not think at all, but is "a highly attentive yet unentangled way of being [...] an open, non-conceptual state of mind that allows one to experience reality directly, as it truly is." Regarding non-thought, Huineng says:

Thoughtlessness is to see and to know all dharmas [things] with a mind free from attachment. When in use it pervades everywhere, and yet it sticks nowhere. What we have to do is to purify our mind so that the six vijñānas [aspects of consciousness], in passing through the six gates [sense organs], will neither be defiled by nor attached to the six sense-objects. When our mind works freely without any hindrance, and is at liberty to come or to go, we attain samādhi of prajñā, or liberation. Such a state is called the function of thoughtlessness. But to refrain from thinking of anything, so that all thoughts are suppressed, is to be dharma-ridden, and this is an erroneous view.

As Gregory points out, for Huineng, no-thought does not refer to a blanking out of the mind. Rather, Huineng says, "Freedom from thought means having no thought in the midst of thoughts." He says that such things as "sitting without moving, getting rid of falsehood, and not giving rise to thoughts" just lead to insentiency. This is to obstruct the Way which should, on the contrary, be allowed to flow freely, without any obstruction. For Huineng, suchness and thought exist together in an essence-function relationship. He says, "Suchness is the essence of thought, thought is the function of suchness."

Related to the teaching of non-thought, Huineng also taught "non-attribute." Just as non-thought does not eradicate thoughts, non-attribute for Huineng likewise is not a world-denying negation of the attributes of sensory experience, the vast array of things and characteristics which make up the basic features of life in the world. Rather, for Huineng, non-attribute has a this-worldly orientation which affirms human experience and the world of characteristics. It does not mean literally to be without any attributes at all, but rather to be free of attributes while right in the midst of attributes. To differentiate and distinguish the various phenomena of the world, and yet to regard them all as the same, is to have equanimity (shě 捨). As Brook Ziporyn observes, for Huineng, our self-nature is free of attributes, not in the sense of excluding them, but in the sense of embracing them all without attaching to them. In this way, our self-nature can be compared to space, while particular attributes are like the things appearing in that space.

Huineng says:

Learned Audience, the illimitable void of the universe is capable of holding myriads of things of various shape and form, such as the sun, the moon, stars, mountains, rivers, men, dharmas pertaining to goodness or badness, deva planes, hells, great oceans, and all the mountains of the Mahāmeru. Space takes in all of these, and so does the voidness of our nature. We say that the essence of mind is great because it embraces all things, since all things are within our nature.

In addition to non-thought and non-attribute, Huineng also taught non-abiding. He says rather than attach to characteristics and obstruct the Way, one should not abide in things. Huineng discusses nonabiding in terms of not dwelling in any experience in the past, present, or future. He says:

Within each moment of experience, not to think of any previous state. For the past experience, the present experience and the subsequent experience to connect up in an unbroken continuity is called bondage. But in relating to all things, to go through each experience without dwelling in it, that is freedom from bondage. This is why nonabiding is the root. (Note: Compare with Mazu: "The former thought, the later thought, and the present thought—all successive moments of thought do not wait for one another, and all successive moments of thought are quiescent and extinct. This is called the ocean-seal samadhi, which contains all dharmas." And also Wuxiang: "In an instant one distinguishes cognition arising, in an instant cognition arises and is extinguished, and if in the instant cognition is extinguished this cognition is not for an instant interrupted, then this is seeing the Buddha." Regarding the ungraspable nature of the mind in the past, present, and future, see the following quotation from a commentary on the Diamond Sutra attributed to Huineng: "The past mind cannot be grasped in that the deluded mind in the preceding thought has already passed in a flash, and there is nowhere to pursue it or look for it. The present mind cannot be grasped in that the true mind has no form, so how can it be seen? The future mind cannot be grasped in that there is originally nothing that can be grasped; when habit energies have been exhausted, they do not occur again. Realizing that past, present, and future mind cannot be grasped is called being a buddha." And also Huangbo: "...the bodhisattva’s mind is like the empty sky, for he has completely relinquished everything. His past mind being unobtainable, there is renunciation of the past; his present mind being unobtainable, there is relinquishment of the present; his future mind being unobtainable, there is renunciation of the future. This is what is known as the renunciation of the three periods.")

Again, like non-thought and non-attribute, non-abiding for Huineng means all thoughts and phenomena are allowed but not clung to, similar to space. However, as Ziporyn points out, Huineng's teaching of non-abiding puts a spin on the motionlessness of the spacelike self-nature. That is, unlike the traditional Buddhist emphasis on stillness and quiescence, which are inactive and register no characteristics or attributes; for Huineng, non-abiding means that true motionlessness is "a kind of hyperintense motion" that never dwells or stays in a single place. (Note: Compare with Sengzhao: "It is said in the Radiance, “Dharmas neither come nor go, they do not move in any way.” Is their motionless activity to be sought by discarding motion and instead pursuing stillness? No, it is within all movements that stillness is to be sought. Since stillness is to be sought within all movements, though moving, dharmas are constantly still. Since stillness is to be sought without discarding motion, though still, their motion never ceases. Indeed, motion and stillness are in no way distinct.")

In this way, as Ziporyn observes, Huineng's teaching reflects indigenous Chinese ideas which give a positive value to change and transformation. According to Ziporyn, for Huineng, enlightenment is associated with flow, constant change and transformation. Huineng says, "Good friends, one's enlightenment (one's Way, dao) must flow freely. How could it be stagnated? When the mind does not reside in the dharmas, one's enlightenment flows freely. For the mind to reside in the dharmas is called 'fettering oneself.' If you say that always sitting without moving is it, then you're just like Śāriputra meditating in the forest, for which he was scolded by Vimalakīrti!" Similarly, the alleged Northern school's emphasis on quiet contemplation was criticized by Huineng thus:

When alive, one keeps sitting without lying down:
When dead, one lies down without sitting up.
In both cases, a set of stinking bones!
What has it to do with the great lesson of life? (Note: It's an irony that his body was mummified after his death, keeping sitting up. See also Justin Ritzinger and Marcus Bingenheimer (2006), Whole-body relics in Chinese Buddhism – Previous Research and Historical Overview and Buddhist mummies)

=== Meditation and wisdom ===
Huineng taught that meditation and wisdom were not sequential, with one being prior to and giving rise to the other, since in that case "the Dharma would have two characteristics." Instead, Huineng says they are not different and form an essence-function relationship. For Huineng, wisdom is the function of meditation, while meditation is the essence of wisdom. In this way, when wisdom is present, so too is meditation; and when meditation is present, so too is wisdom. Huineng uses an analogy of a lamp and its light to illustrate this point. Where light is the function of a lamp, the lamp is the essence of the light. (Note: Compare with Sengzhao: "...all things converge: once it is asserted that the sage has attained this apex-as-one-with-nonbeing, why distinguish between 'concentration' and 'insight'? For do the terms 'concentration' and 'wisdom' not fall outside this unity? If these appellations were to emerge within the unity, their very presence would compromise the unity. But since they emerge outside of it, they have no bearing at all on the [sagely] self.")

As Gregory points out, Huineng's oneness of meditation and wisdom is a sudden practice, as it does not treat meditation, or concentration, as a means of achieving wisdom. For that would be to understand meditation and wisdom dualistically. Moreover, using meditation as a means takes enlightenment as something to be realized in the future. Such an understanding is gradualistic and fails to recognize the enlightenment that is already present.

=== Dhyāna ===
Huineng defines zuochan, seated meditation, in a non-literal way as follows. He says "sitting" (zuo) means for the mind not to be activated in regards to various good and bad realms externally, while "meditation" (chan) means to see the motionlessness of the self-nature internally. He criticizes mere motionlessness of the body, as well as the practices of concentrating on mind and on purity. He says:

If one is to concentrate on the mind, then the mind [involved] is fundamentally false. You should understand that the mind is like a phantasm, so nothing can concentrate on it. If one is to concentrate on purity, then [realize that because] our natures are fundamentally pure, it is through false thoughts that suchness is covered up. Just be without false thoughts and the nature is pure of itself. If you activate your mind to become attached to purity, you will only generate the falseness of purity. The false is without location; it is the concentration that is false. Purity is without shape and characteristics; you only create the characteristics of purity and say this is 'effort' [in meditation]. To have such a view is to obscure one's own fundamental nature, and only to be fettered by purity.

As Gregory observes, concentrating on, or viewing, the mind and purity are both dualistic as this is to make mind and purity into objects. (Note: Compare with Zongmi: "...the Northern lineage's gazing at mind misses the true purport. If mind could be gazed at, then it would be an object." And also the Miscellaneous Dialogues of Shenhui: Question: “What does it mean to not view the mind?” Answer: “To view is false, and to be without the false is to be without viewing.” Question: “What does it mean to not view purity?” Answer: “To be without defilement is [also] to be without purity. Purity is just another characteristic, and so one should not view it.”) Such objectification is false. Moreover, our nature is intrinsically pure, but activating the mind to view purity only externalizes that nature. This is to be deluded and to cover our fundamental purity so that it will not be seen. (Note: See also the Śūraṅgama Sūtra: "If mind be set on searching for the mind, that which At heart is not illusion becomes illusory.")

== Historical impact and influences ==
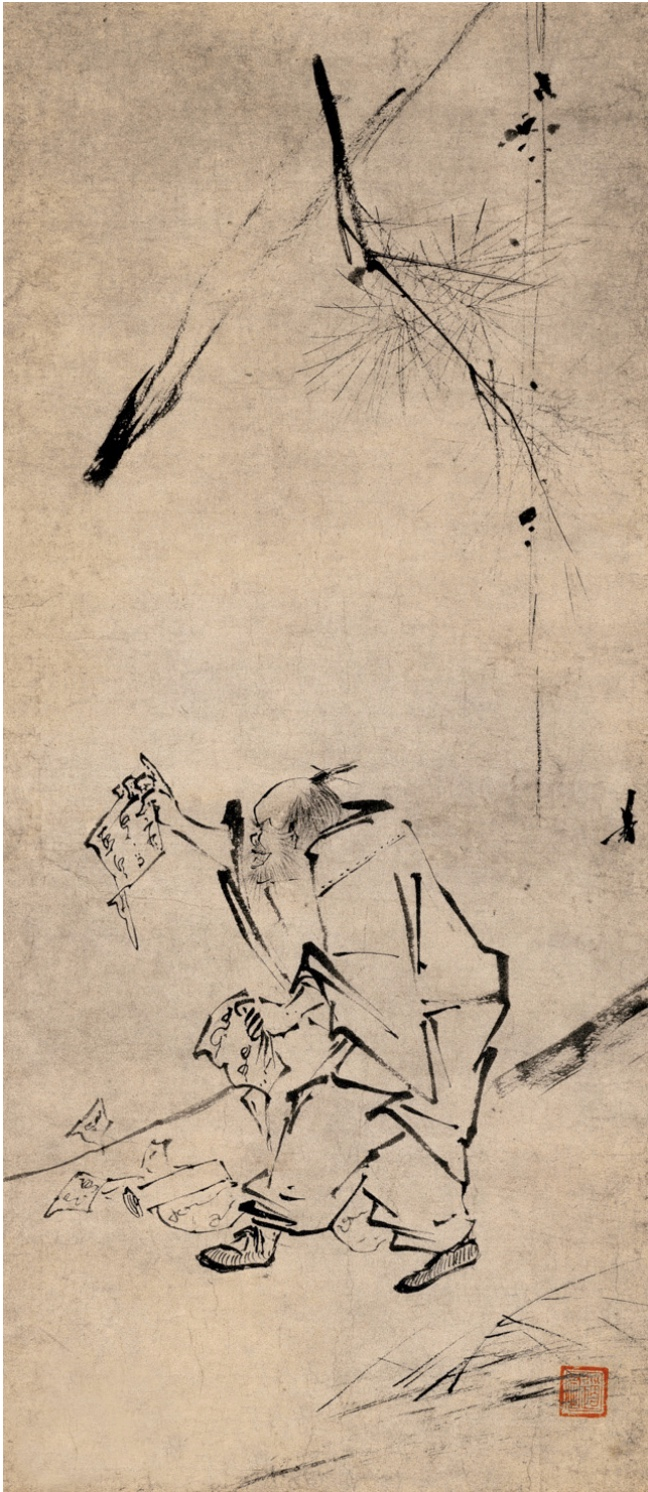
Liang Kai, The Sixth Patriarch Tearing a Sutra, Song Dynasty (960–1279 AD)

Doctrinally, the Southern School is associated with the teaching that enlightenment is sudden, while the Northern School is associated with the teaching that enlightenment is gradual. This is a polemical exaggeration, since both schools were derived from the same tradition, and the so-called Southern School incorporated many teachings of the more influential Northern School. Eventually both schools died out, but the influence of Shenhui was so immense that all later Chan schools traced their origin to Huineng, and "sudden enlightenment" became a standard doctrine of Chan.

According to modern historiography, Huineng was a marginal and obscure historical figure. Modern scholarship has questioned his hagiography, with some researchers speculating that this story was created around the middle of the 8th century, beginning in 731 by Shenhui, who supposedly was a successor to Huineng, to win influence at the Imperial Court. He claimed Huineng to be the successor to Hongren, instead of the then publicly recognized successor Shenxiu:

It was through the propaganda of Shenhui (684-758) that Huineng (d. 710) became the also today still towering figure of sixth patriarch of Chan/Zen Buddhism, and accepted as the ancestor or founder of all subsequent Chan lineages [...] using the life of Confucius as a template for its structure, Shenhui invented a hagiography for the then highly obscure Huineng. At the same time, Shenhui forged a lineage of patriarchs of Chan back to the Buddha using ideas from Indian Buddhism and Chinese ancestor worship.

In 745, Shenhui was invited to take up residence in the Heze temple in Luoyang. In 753, he fell out of grace, and had to leave the capital to go into exile. The most prominent of the successors of his lineage was Guifeng Zongmi. According to Zongmi, Shenhui's approach was officially sanctioned in 796, when "an imperial commission determined that the Southern line of Ch'an represented the orthodox transmission and established Shen-hui as the seventh patriarch, placing an inscription to that effect in the Shen-lung temple".

According to Schlütter and Teiser, the biography of Huineng explained in the Platform Sutra is a compelling legend of an illiterate, "barbarian" layman who became a Patriarch of Chan Buddhism. Most of what we know about Huineng comes from the Platform Sutra, which consists of the record of a public talk that includes an autobiography of Huineng, which was a hagiography, i.e. a biography of a saint portraying him as a hero.This pseudoautobiography was written to give authority to the teachings of Huineng. The Sutra became a very popular text, and was circulated widely in an attempt to increase the importance of the Huineng lineage. As a result, the account might have been altered over the centuries. Shenhui (685-758) was the first person to claim that Huineng was both a saint and a hero. As a result of this contested claim, modifications were made to the Platform Sutra, a manuscript copy of which was later found at Dunhuang.

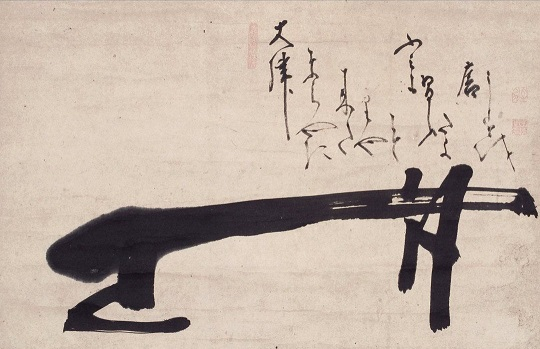
Hakuin Ekaku, The Sixth Patriarch's Rice Mill, Edo period (1603–1867 AD)

It turns out that little was known about Huineng before Shenhui's account of him. "It took all the rhetorical skills of Shen-hui and his sympathizers to give a form to the name Huineng,"; thus, the character Huineng described by Shenhui was not completely factual. In the Platform Sutra, following Huineng's sermon was a narrative by Fahai, who addressed a few interviews between Huineng and his disciples, including Shenhui. It is likely that "much of the Platform Sutra was built on the inventions of Shenhui," and the textual evidence suggests that "the work was written soon after his death." After Huineng's death, Shenhui wanted to claim his authority over Chan Buddhism, but his position was challenged by Shenxiu and Puji, who supported the Northern lineage that taught gradual enlightenment. It is reasonable to assume that this autobiography was likely an attempt by Shenhui to relate himself to the most renowned figures in Zen Buddhism, which essentially enabled him to connect to the Buddha through this lineage.

An epitaph of Huineng inscribed by the established poet Wang Wei also reveals inconsistencies with Shenhui's account of Huineng. The epitaph "does not attack Northern Chan, and adds new information on a monk, Yinzong (627-713), who is said to have tonsured Huineng." Wang Wei was a poet and a government official, whereas Shenhui was a propagandist who preached to the crowd, which again leads to questions about his credibility.

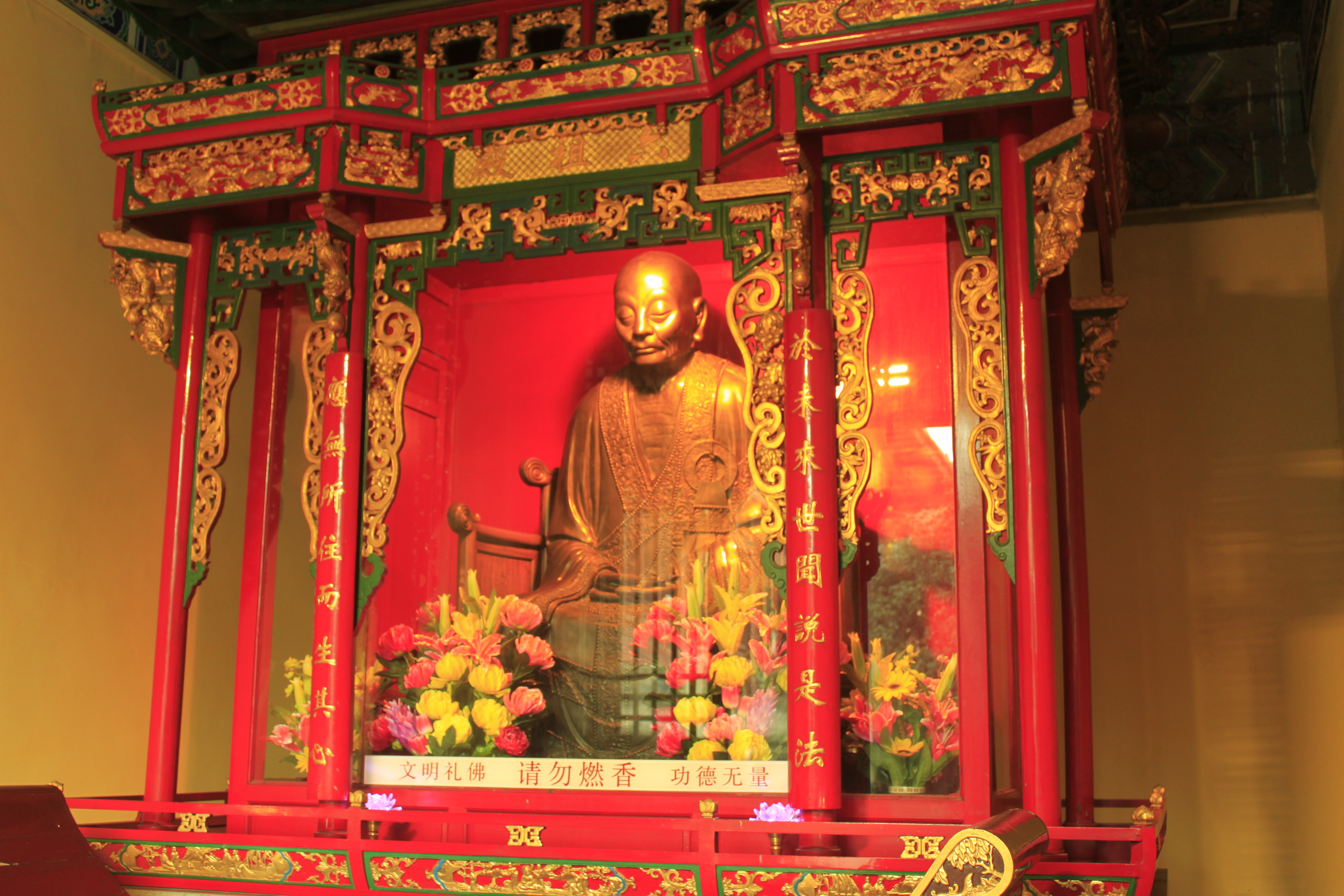
Shrine to Huineng at Nanhai Guanyin Temple in Foshan, Guangdong, China.

"As far as can be determined from surviving evidence, Shenhui possessed little or no reliable information on Huineng except that he was a disciple of Hongren, lived in Shaozhou, and was regarded by some Chan followers as a teacher of only regional importance." It seems that Shenhui invented the figure of Huineng for himself to become the "true heir of the single line of transmission from the Buddha in the Southern lineage," and this appears to be the only way he could have done so.

On a related note, the Chan Buddhist practices, including the wordless transmission and sudden enlightenment, were much different from the traditional training of a monk. According to Kieschnick, "The Chan accounts ridicule every element of the scholar-monk ideal that had taken shape over the centuries in traditional hagiography," with examples found in the immense literature of the "classical period."

== Mummification ==
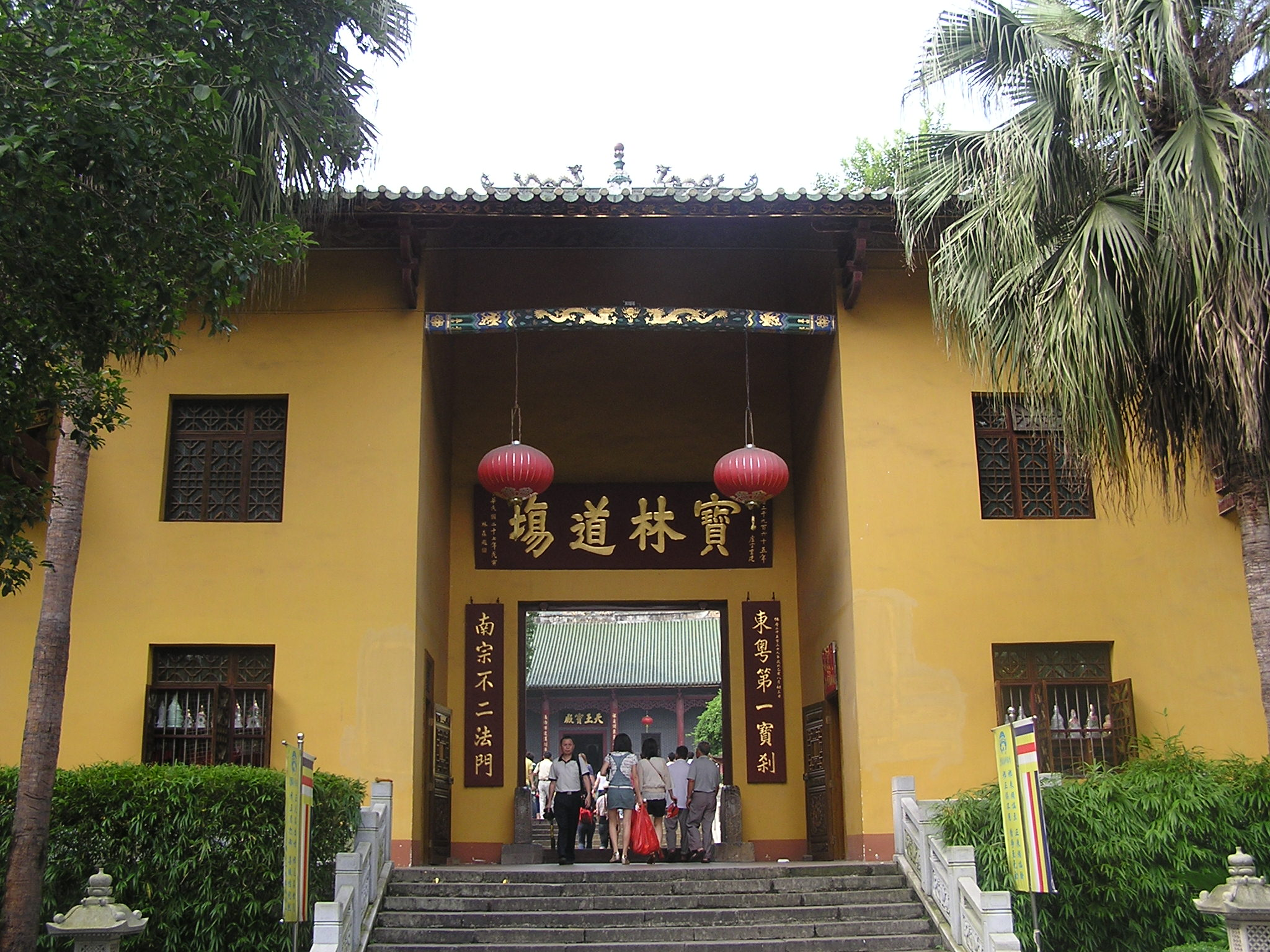
Nanhua Temple today, where Huineng is said to have lived and taught.

A mummified body, supposedly that of Huineng, is kept in Nanhua Temple in Shaoguan (northern Guangdong). (Note: Images of Huineng's temple and Mummy) This mummy was seen by the Jesuit Matteo Ricci who visited Nanhua Temple in 1589. Ricci told the European readers the story of Huineng (in a somewhat edited form), describing him as akin to a Christian ascetic. Ricci names him Liùzǔ (i.e. 六祖, "The Sixth Ancestor").

During the Cultural Revolution, the mummy was damaged by the Red Guards.

== Liang Kai's portrayal of Huineng ==
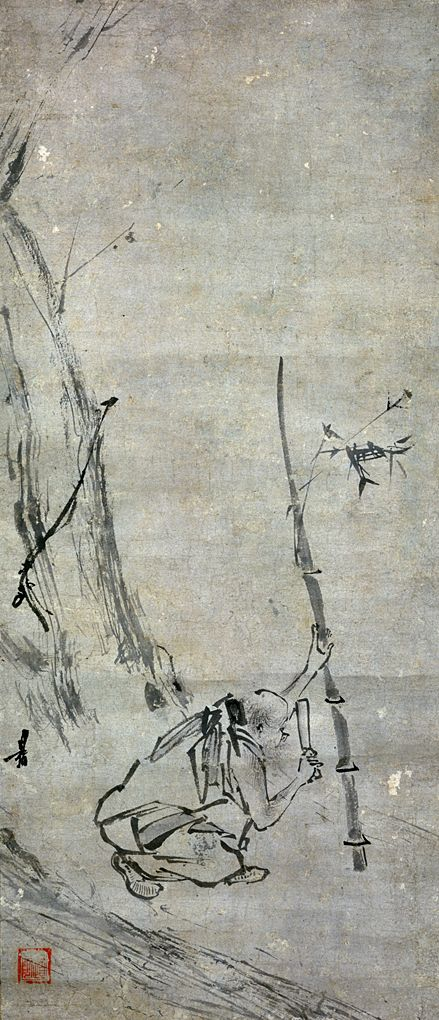
Liang Kai, The Sixth Patriarch Cutting the Bamboo, Song Dynasty (960–1279 AD)

The two paintings shown above and to the right were both completed by Liang Kai, a painter from Southern Song dynasty, who left his position as the court painter in Jia Tai's court to practice Chan. These paintings depict Huineng, the Sixth Patriarch of Chan Buddhism. The protagonist occupies the lower central portion of both paintings, with his face turned to the side, so that his facial features are not portrayed.

"The Sixth Patriarch Cutting the Bamboo" depicts the process that Huineng went through to attain enlightenment, and exemplifies Huineng's concentration and contemplation in doing so through the process of chopping bamboo. This particular enlightenment moment of his is only documented in this painting, and not in any literary sources. He holds an ax in his right hand, and extends his left arm to steady a stalk of bamboo while scrutinizing it. The brushstrokes are loose and free but construct a simplistic and lively image: they indicate a subtle motion of pulling the bamboo towards him. Huineng wears a shirt with sleeves rolled up, which is suggested by the crease at the edges of the shoulders. He puts his extra cloth into a hair bun. The light and dark ink indicate gradation and contrast, and the light shadow on his right arm and body of bamboo implies the source of light.

Similarly, "The Sixth Patriarch Tearing a Sutra" (above) adopts a similar style in depicting the same figure, Huineng, symbolically repudiating attachment to texts. This reaffirms the focus of the Southern Chan Tradition, which is to attain sudden enlightenment without having to train to be a monk in the conventional way or to study Buddhist scriptures.

== Film ==
- A Chinese biopic entitled Legend of Dajian Huineng is based on Huineng. The film is adapted from an older version of the story, found in youtube as "Story of a Zen Master" in Wutang Collection.

== See also ==
- Hong Yi
- Zen lineage charts

== Sources ==
Printed sources

- Addiss, Stephen; Lombardo, Stanley; Roitman, Judith (2008), Zen sourcebook : traditional documents from China, Korea, and Japan, Indianapolis: Hackett Pub. Co, ISBN 9780872209091, OCLC 173243878
- Gregory, Peter N. (1991), Sudden Enlightenment Followed by Gradual Cultivation: Tsung-mi's Analysis of mind. In: Peter N. Gregory (editor)(1991), Sudden and Gradual. Approaches to Enlightenment in Chinese Thought, Delhi: Motilal Banarsidass Publishers Private Limited
- Hsing Yun (2010), The Rabbit's Horn: A Commentary on the Platform Sutra, Buddha's Light Publishing
- Jorgensen, John (2005), Inventing Hui-neng, the Sixth Patriarch Hagiography and Biography in Early Ch'an, Leiden: Brill
- Kieschnick, John (1997), The eminent monk : Buddhist ideals in medieval Chinese hagiography, Honolulu: University of Hawai'i Press, ISBN 0824818415, OCLC 36423410
- McRae, John (2000), The Platform Sutra of the Sixth Patriarch. Translated from the Chinese of Zongbao (PDF), Berkeley: Numata Center for Buddhist Translation and Research, archived from the original (PDF) on August 22, 2012
- McRae, John (2003), Seeing Through Zen, The University Press Group Ltd
- Pine, Red. The Platform Sutra: The Zen Teaching of Hui-Neng. (2006) Counterpoint. ISBN 1-59376-177-5
- Price, A.F.; Wong, Mou-lam (1990), The Diamond Sutra and The Sutra of Hui-neng, Boston: Shambhala Dragon Editions
- Schlütter, Morten; Teiser, Stephen F. (2012), Readings of the Platform sūtra, New York: Columbia University Press, ISBN 9780231500555, OCLC 787845142
- Schlütter, Morten (2007). "Transmission and Enlightenment in Chan Buddhism Seen Through the Platform Sūtra" (PDF). Chung-hwa Buddhist Journal (20). Taipei: 396.
- Watts, Alan W. The Way of Zen (1962) Great Britain: Pelican books. ISBN 0-14-020547-0
- Wu, John C. H. (2004), The Golden Age of Zen: Zen Masters of the T'ang Dynasty, World Wisdom, ISBN 0-941532-44-5
- Yampolski, Philip (2003), Chan. A Historical Sketch. In: Buddhist Spirituality. Later China, Korea, Japan and the Modern World; edited by Takeuchi Yoshinori, Delhi: Motilal Banarsidass
- Yampolski, Philip; McRae, John R. (2005), "Huineng", in Jones, Lindsay (ed.), MacMillan Encyclopedia of Religion, MacMillan

Web-sources

Buddhist titles
| Preceded by Daman Hongren | Chan/Zen patriarch (Shenhui lineage) | Succeeded by Shenhui |
| Preceded by Daman Hongren | Caodong Chan/Sōtō Zen patriarch | Succeeded by Qingyuan Xingsi |
| Preceded by Daman Hongren | Linji Chan/Rinzai Zen patriarch | Succeeded by Nanyue Huairang |
