= Shenhui =

Chinese Buddhist monk (684–758)

Heze Shenhui 菏澤神會
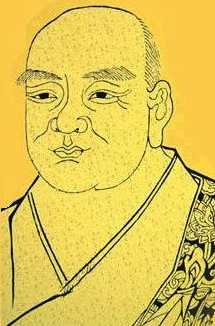
- Title: Chan master

Personal life
- Born: 684 Xiangyang, China
- Died: 758 (aged 74)

Religious life
- Religion: Buddhism
- School: Chan

Senior posting
- Teacher: Dajian Huineng
- Predecessor: Dajian Huineng

Heze Shenhui (Chinese:菏澤神會/菏泽神会; Wade–Giles: Shen-hui; Japanese: Kataku Jinne, 684–758) was a Chinese Buddhist monk of the so-called "Southern School" of Chan/Zen, who "claimed to have studied under Huineng."

Shenhui is notable for his strident attacks on Yuquan Shenxiu and the associated "Northern School", which was the most prominent branch of Chan Buddhism in China at the time. He accused them of propagating gradual teachings, as opposed to his own sudden teachings.

Shenhui's own lineage, called the Heze lineage (菏澤宗), probably died out around the time of the Great Anti-Buddhist Persecution in 845, with Guifeng Zongmi being the only notable monk in the lineage.

== Biography ==
Shenhui was born in Xiangyang with the surname Gao (高). He learned The Five Classics of Confucius and the philosophy of Laozi and Zhuangzi at a young age.

At the age of 14 he became a monk under Huineng, a disciple of Hongren and the founder of the Southern School of Zen. For a time Shenhui served as his attendant.

Several extant stories relate encounters between Huineng and Shenhui. In one, Huineng said to his students,

I have something which has no head or tail. It is nameless and can't be described. It has no back and no front. Do any of you know what this is?"

Shenhui then said, "It is the source of all things. It is the Buddha Nature of Shenhui".
Huineng responds, "I said it has no name and no description. How can you say it is the source of Buddha Nature?"
Shenhui then bowed and returned to his seat, but Huineng then proclaimed, "In the future if this youngster heads a monastery, it will certainly bring forth fully realized disciples of our school."

Shenhui later went to Changan to receive ordination.

In his writings and lectures Shenhui attacked what he called the "Northern School" of Zen. Despite his attacks on the Northern School, Shenhui traveled north to live amongst his ideological enemies in the capital city of Luoyang. While in the city he spoke publicly against the teachings of the Northern School.

Shenhui was a highly successful fundraiser for the government despite his criticism of Shenxiu for having governmental ties. During the An Lushan Rebellion, monks were asked to lecture, and sell certificates to the public in order to raise money for the counteroffensive. Shenhui was active in this endeavor in Luoyang, and reportedly very effective. Despite this, he was eventually banished from the city for stirring up trouble.

Shenhui was said to have died while meditating in 760. His burial stupa is located at Longmen Grottoes. One of his extant writings is Xianzongji (显宗记).

== Attack on Shenxiu and the "Northern School" ==
=== Shenhui's attack ===
Shenhui coined the term "Northern School" in order to deride Shenxiu's school. He claimed that Shenxiu tried to usurp the title of Sixth Patriarch from Huineng. He supported his claims by stating that Huineng possessed the robe of Bodhidharma, the First Patriarch of Zen.

In 734, an attack was staged at the Great Cloud Temple in Huatai. He delivered a talk titled the Exposition on Right and Wrong in regards to Bodhidharma's Southern School. It was presented in the form of a discussion between him and a monk named Chongyuan, who took the side of Shenxiu's Northern School. Shenhui used the opportunity to question Shenxiu's legitimacy as Hongren's successor.

He also accused "Northern School" students of trying to steal Bodhidharma's robe, to sever the head of Huineng's mummy, and to rewrite the inscription on Shenxiu's tomb with the words "Sixth Patriarch".

Most memorably, however, he accused the Northern School of advocating "gradual" and not "sudden" enlightenment.However, some scholars indicate that Shenxiu's extant writings do not support the view that he rejected sudden enlightenment. Indeed, according to McRae, Shenxiu's Guanxin Lun (觀心論; Treatise on the Contemplation of the Mind) states: “It does not take long to witness this; enlightenment is in the instant. Why worry about your white hair (i.e., about your age)?”

=== Historical analysis of Shenhui's attack ===
Several scholars consider Shenhui's arguments against the "Northern School" to be fabrications or exaggerations. Heinrich Dumoulin, commenting on Shenhui's accusations, wrote that Shenhui was "unscrupulous", while Ui Hakuju wrote that he had “traits deserving of moral censure and criticism for intolerance”.

Scholars such as Philip Yampolsky have suggested that one of his disciples may have written the Platform Sutra, which glorifies Huineng and "sudden" enlightenment while deriding Shenxiu.

Scholars note that both the concept of a "patriarch" and the possession of the robe of Bodhidharma being the indicator of this person probably arose as a result of Shenhui's diatribes. In fact, according to the Platform Sutra, Huineng himself did not pass on the robe, nor did he name a "patriarch" to replace him. Rather, like his teacher Hongren, he had many disciples who went on to teach Zen.

Philip Yampolsky wrote that Shenhui's claim that the Diamond Sutra and not the Lankavatara Sutra was the paramount sutra of Bodhidharma and his disciples was "pure fabrication".

== Teachings ==
In elucidating his position of sudden enlightenment, Shenhui explained the difference between the teaching of his master Huineng and that of Shenxiu (who was accused of promoting gradual awakening) in the following exchange with Dharma Master Chongyuan:

Dharma Master Chongyuan asked, “Why shouldn’t one [regulate] the mind to realize the internal?” His Reverence replied, “That is the teaching of fools! Chan Master Huineng’s practice transcends the two Dharmas of regulating and not regulating. Therefore the text of the [Vimalakīrti] Sūtra [reads], ‘The mind does not abide within, nor is it located without: this is sitting in meditation....If one sits like this, the Buddha will [grant] the seal of certification.’ For the past six generations, no one ever [taught people to] ‘freeze the mind to enter meditation, fix the mind to view purity, activate the mind to illuminate the external, and concentrate the mind to realize the internal.’ That’s why [the teachings of Shenxiu and Huineng] are not the same.”

In this exchange, Shenhui presents his famous "four pronouncements" in which he denounces the Northern School practices of freezing the mind to enter concentration, fixing the mind to view purity, activating the mind for external illumination, and concentrating the mind for internal realization. For Shenhui, activating intentions to grasp bodhi, nirvana, emptiness, purity, or concentration were all examples of the false mind. Instead, Shenhui taught that true non-thought is to not intentionalize and not activate the mind. However, he says: "If you intentionally make your mind not activate, this is the concentration of consciousness. It is also called the concentration of mistaken views of the Dharma." Ultimately, Shenhui taught going beyond both intentionalizing and not intentionalizing since to intentionalize was to be fettered, while to not intentionalize made one "no different than a deaf fool."

According to Shenhui, entering into and exiting from concentration were still conditioned and failed to transcend the false mind. (Note: Compare with Xuance's words in the Platform Sutra: "How can you enter it or come out of it? If there is entering and coming out, then this is not the great samādhi.") He says should the false mind become activated so that one's thoughts stray "far and near," one should not try to bring the mind back into concentration. He says: "To make the mind go out is illness, and to make it come back into concentration is also illness. Both making it go out and making it come back are illness." Instead, he says if one can simply "shine the light of awareness" on a thought as soon as it arises, it will vanish into the light of awareness naturally. What's more, he says the light of awareness too will of itself also disappear. For Shenhui, the disappearing of thought with awareness is "precisely [what is meant by] the non-abiding mind of one’s original nature."

Shenhui associates non-abiding with fundamental serenity. Relying on the essence-function paradigm, he identifies serenity with essence and says, "Based on the essence of this empty serenity there naturally exists a fundamental wisdom, [of which] it is said that knowing is its function of illumination." For Shenhui, while serenity is essence, knowing the empty serenity of the mind is function. He says, "Non-abiding is the fundamental quiescence of the self-nature (ben zixing ji 本自性寂). Knowing is the function. Quiescence is the essence of illumination, and illumination is the function of quiescence." For Shenhui, this is also what is meant by the equivalence of concentration and wisdom. (Note: Compare with the Zongjing lu version of a quotation from the Treatise on the Transcendence of Cognition (Jueguan lun): Question: “What does mind do?” Answer: “Mind tranquilly extinguishes.” [...] Question: “How is it that meditation and wisdom journey together?” Answer: “The tranquil extinction of the mind-nature is meditation. Constantly understanding tranquil extinction is wisdom.”) He says:

Non-abiding is quiescence, and the essence of quiescence is called concentration. The natural wisdom (zhi 智) that occurs on the basis of this essence, whereby one can know the inherently quiescent essence, is called sagacity (hui 慧). This is the equivalence of concentration and wisdom. The sūtra says, “Activate illumination on the basis of serenity,” and the meaning here is the same. The non-abiding mind does not transcend knowing, and knowing does not transcend non-abiding. If one knows the mind’s non-abiding, there is nothing else to be known. The Nirvāṇa Sūtra says, “For concentration to be great and wisdom little is to increase one’s ignorance. For wisdom to be great and concentration little is to increase one’s wrong views. For concentration and wisdom to be equivalent is called ‘seeing the Buddha-nature.’” (Note: In a similar fashion, Shenhui criticized alternating samādhi and prajñā as follows. He said, "If you now penetrate to that state in which your mind is not attached, and yet remain open (to impressions), and thus are conscious of the fact that your mind is not attached, then you have reached the state of original blankness and tranquility. From that state of blankness and tranquility there arises an inner (t'i) knowledge through which the blue, yellow, red, white things in this world are well distinguished. That is prajñā. Yet no (desires) arise from these distinctions. That is samādhi. Those who 'freeze their mind when entering samādhi' first drop into an irrelevant (avyārkṛta) void, afterwards when they awake from samādhi and their mind works again, they discern all the different mundane entities. This they call prajñā, but the sūtras call it self-deception. In their case prajñā alternates with samādhi. People who understand (samādhi-prajñā) this way do not get rid of their passions.")

Regarding the practice of seated meditation, Shenhui did not teach that physical sitting was necessary. He says: "When I say ‘sit,’ [I mean that] ‘sitting’ is for thoughts to not be activated. When I say ‘meditation,’ [I mean that] ‘meditation’ is to see the fundamental nature. Therefore I do not teach people to have their bodies sit and their minds abide while entering into concentration."

Shenhui was also critical of "secret teachings." He says:

When other masters are asked about this teaching, they do not explain but keep it secret. I am completely different—whether to many persons or few, I always explain it to everyone. [...] The teachings of the buddhas of the past have all been directed at the eightfold congregation; there has been no private teaching, no secret teaching. (Note: See also Zongmi's Chan Prolegomenon: "'Do those who at present transmit the dharma speak secret oral transmissions [miyu] or not?' I have now answered this question. The dharma is Bodhidharma's dharma. Therefore, those who hear it, however deep or shallow, are all benefited. It is just that in the past it was secret, whereas now it is open. Therefore, it is not called a secret oral transmission. Just because the name is different [from what it was in Bodhidharma's time] does not imply that the dharma is also different." And also the Extensive Record of Baizhang: "Question: Since high antiquity the ancestral schools have all had esoteric sayings handed down successor to successor; what about it? The master said, There are no secret sayings; those who come to realize thusness do not have a secret treasure." And see also the Platform Sutra: "...Huiming [experienced] a great enlightenment. He then questioned me again, saying, ‘Other than the secret words and secret intention [you expressed] just now, is there any other secret intention?’ I said, ‘What I have preached to you is not secret. If you counter-illuminate [your own original face you will realize that] the secret was on your side.’")

== Influence ==
In the early 10th century, the founder of the Fayan School commented on Shenhui's lineage:

The record of that time was indeed excellent. Today, if we point to a greatly awakened school, it is the Heze school.

Shenhui's own lineage, called the Heze school, probably died out around the time of the Great Anti-Buddhist Persecution in 845. His best-known descendant in this school was Guifeng Zongmi, who was also the fifth patriarch of the Huayan school. According to Tsung-mi, Shen-hui's approach was officially sanctioned in 796, when "an imperial commission determined that the Southern line of Ch'an represented the orthodox transmission and established Shen-hui as the seventh patriarch, placing an inscription to that effect in the shen-lung temple".

Shenhui's distinction between "gradual" versus "sudden" methods of enlightenment became a hallmark of Chinese Zen. Mazu Daoyi, whose Hongzhou school became the hallmark of Zen, was an early and important adopter of the "sudden" approach.

His speeches were found again in Dunhuang.

== Sources ==
- McRae, John R. (2003), Seeing through Zen: Encounter, Transformation, and Genealogy in Chinese Chan Buddhism, Berkeley & Los Angeles: University of California Press, ISBN 978-0-520-23798-8
- Yampolsky, Philip B. (1967), The Platform Sutra of the Sixth Patriarch, New York: Columbia University Press, ISBN 978-0-231-08361-4
