= Sudden awakening =

Sudden awakening to Enlightenment

Sudden awakening or Sudden enlightenment (Chinese: 頓悟; pinyin: Dùnwù; Japanese pronunciation: tongo), also known as subitism, is a Buddhist idea which holds that practitioners can achieve an instantaneous insight into ultimate reality (Buddha-nature, or the nature of mind). This awakening is described as being attained "suddenly," "in one glance," "uncovered all together," "beyond conceptual elaborations” or "together, completely, simultaneously," in contrast to "successively or being uncovered one after the other." It may be posited as opposite to gradualism, an approach which says that liberation (moksha, vimutti) can be achieved only through a long gradual step by step process.

== Etymology ==
The application of the term "subitism" to Buddhism is derived from the French illumination subite (sudden awakening), contrasting with 'illumination graduelle' (gradual awakening). It gained currency in this use in English from the work of sinologist Paul Demiéville. His 1947 work 'Mirror of the Mind' was widely read in the U.S. It inaugurated a series by him on subitism and gradualism. (Note: Bernard Faure, Chan/Zen Studies in English: The State Of The Field)

The Chinese term dun 頓, as used in dunwu 頓悟, translated as "subite," sudden, has a broader meaning than "sudden." It is more apt translated as "in one glance," "uncovered all together," or "together, completely, simultaneously," in contrast to "successively or being uncovered one after the other." It means that all aspects of Buddhist practice are realized, or actualized, simultaneously, and not one after another as in a gradual or linear school curriculum. Specifically, the defilements are not erased gradually, by good works, but simultaneously. (Note: Whalen Lai notes two essential theses from Tao-Sheng: "doing good incurs no reward" and "by sudden enlightenment one becomes a Buddha." Compare the famous meeting of Bodhidharma with Emperor Xiāo Yǎn: Emperor Wu: "How much karmic merit have I earned for ordaining Buddhist monks, building monasteries, having sutras copied, and commissioning Buddha images?" Bodhidharma: "None. Good deeds done with worldly intent bring good karma, but no merit." Emperor Wu: "So what is the highest meaning of noble truth?" Bodhidharma: "There is no noble truth, there is only emptiness." Emperor Wu: "Then, who is standing before me?" Bodhidharma: "I know not, Your Majesty.")

Subitizing, also derived from the Latin adjective subitus, is the rapid, accurate, and confident judgments of numbers performed for small numbers of items.

== Dun wu in Chinese Buddhism ==
=== Chan ===
The distinction between sudden awakening and gradual awakening (Chinese: 漸悟) has its roots in Indian Buddhism. It was first introduced in China at the beginning of the 5th century by Daosheng. The term became of central importance in Chan Buddhism, where it is used to denote the doctrinal position that awakening, the comprehension or realization of the Buddhist teachings, happens simultaneously, and is not the fruit of a gradual accretion or realisation.

==== Shenhui ====
In the 8th century the distinction became part of a struggle for influence at the Chinese court by Shenhui, a student of Huineng. Hereafter "sudden enlightenment" became one of the hallmarks of Chan Buddhism, though the sharp distinction was softened by subsequent generations of practitioners.

This softening is reflected in the Platform Sutra of Huineng.

While the Patriarch was living in Bao Lin Monastery, the Grand Master Shen Xiu was preaching in Yu Quan Monastery of Jing Nan. At that time the two Schools, that of Hui Neng of the South and Shen Xiu of the North, flourished side by side. As the two Schools were distinguished from each other by the names "Sudden" (the South) and "Gradual" (the North), the question which sect they should follow baffled certain Buddhist scholars (of that time). (Seeing this), the Patriarch addressed the assembly as follows:
So far as the Dharma is concerned, there can be only one School. (If a distinction exists) it exists in the fact that the founder of one school is a northern man, while the other is a southerner. While there is only one dharma, some disciples realize it more quickly than others. The reason why the names 'Sudden' and 'Gradual' are given is that some disciples are superior to others in mental dispositions. So far as the Dharma is concerned, the distinction of 'Sudden' and 'Gradual' does not exist. (Note: The Sudden School and the Gradual School. Chapter VIII)

==== Rivalry between schools ====
While the socalled "Southern School" was said to place emphasis on sudden enlightenment, it also marked a shift in doctrinal basis from the Laṅkāvatāra Sūtra to the prajnaparamita tradition, especially the Diamond Sutra. The Laṅkāvatāra Sūtra, which endorses the Buddha-nature, emphasized purity of mind, which can be attained in gradations. The Diamond Sutra emphasizes śūnyatā, which "must be realized totally or not at all".

Once this dichotomy was in place, it defined its own logic and rhetorics, which are also recognizable in the distinction between Caodong (Sōtō) and Linji (Rinzai) schools. But it also leads to a "sometimes bitter and always prolix sectarian controversy between later Ch'an and Hua-yen exegetes". In the Huayan classification of teachings, the sudden approach was regarded inferior to the Perfect Teaching of Huayan. Guifeng Zongmi, fifth patriarch of Huayan and Chan master, devised his own classification to counter this subordination. To establish the superiority of Chan, Jinul, the most important figure in the formation of Korean Seon, explained the sudden approach as not pointing to mere emptiness, but to suchness or the dharmadhatu.

==== Later re-interpretations ====
Guifeng Zongmi, fifth-generation successor to Shenhui, also softened the edge between sudden and gradual. In his analysis, sudden awakening points to seeing into one's true nature, but is to be followed by a gradual cultivation to attain buddhahood.

This gradual cultivation is also recognized by Dongshan Liangjie, who described the Five Ranks of enlightenment. (Note: The Five Ranks of Tozan) Other example of depiction of stages on the path are the Ten Bulls, which detail the steps on the Path, the Three Mysterious Gates of Linji, and the Four Ways of Knowing of Hakuin Ekaku. This gradual cultivation is described by Chan Master Sheng Yen as follows:

Ch'an expressions refer to enlightenment as "seeing your self-nature". But even this is not enough. After seeing your self-nature, you need to deepen your experience even further and bring it into maturation. You should have enlightenment experience again and again and support them with continuous practice. Even though Ch'an says that at the time of enlightenment, your outlook is the same as of the Buddha, you are not yet a full Buddha.

=== Huayen ===
In the Fivefold Classification of the Huayan and the Five Periods and Eight Teachings of the Tiantai, the sudden teaching was given a high place. However, it was still inferior to these schools' Complete or Perfect teachings.

== Pure Land Buddhism ==
The Pure Land Buddhist patriarch Shandao clarified that the Pure Land teaching is a sudden Dharma Door, since on birth the pure land, one attains sudden non-retrogression, while all other paths of practice will take countless lifetimes. Honen explained it as “the sudden of the sudden (頓中頓) teachings”. Shinran classified the pure land path as the easy path of Sudden Crosswise Transcendence (contra the Lengthwise and difficult practice of the "path of sages").

In the Japanese Pure Land school, the realization of shinjin (true faith), which guaranteed one's birth in the pure land, was often described as a sudden religious experience. This was called "ichi-nen" (the one thought moment) or “faith in one nenbutsu” (shin no ichinen) by figures like Shinran and Kōsai.

== Korean Seon ==
Jinul (1158–1210), a Seon master, followed Zongmi and also emphasized that insight into our true nature is sudden but must be followed by practice to ripen it and attain full Buddhahood.

In contemporary Korean Seon, Seongcheol defended the stance of "sudden insight, sudden cultivation". Citing Taego Bou (1301–1382) as the true successor of the Linji Yixuan line of patriarchs rather than Jinul, he advocated Huineng's original stance of 'sudden enlightenment, sudden cultivation' (Chinese: 頓悟頓修; Korean: 돈오돈수) as opposed to Jinul's stance of 'sudden enlightenment, gradual cultivation' (Chinese: 頓悟漸修; Korean: 돈오점수). Whereas Jinul had initially asserted that with enlightenment comes the need to further one's practice by gradually destroying the karmic vestiges attained through millions of rebirths, Huineng and Seongcheol maintained that with perfect enlightenment, all karmic remnants disappear and one becomes a Buddha immediately.

== Japanese Zen ==
When Zen was introduced in the west, the Rinzai stories of unconventional masters and sudden enlightenment caught the popular imagination. D. T. Suzuki was a seminal influence in this regard. It was Suzuki's contention that a Zen satori (awakening) was the goal of the tradition's training. As Suzuki portrayed it, Zen Buddhism was a highly practical religion whose emphasis on direct experience made it particularly comparable to forms of mystical experience that scholars such as William James had emphasized as the fountainhead of all religious sentiment.

== Tibetan Dzogchen ==
Dzogchen (Wylie: rdzogs chen, "Great Perfection" or "Great Completion"), also known as atiyoga (utmost yoga), is a sudden-enlightenment tradition of teachings in Indo-Tibetan Buddhism and Yungdrung Bon aimed at discovering and continuing in the ultimate ground of existence. The primordial ground (gzhi, "basis") is said to have the qualities of purity (i.e. emptiness), spontaneity (lhun grub, associated with luminous clarity) and compassion (thugs rje). The goal of Dzogchen is knowledge of this basis, this knowledge is called rigpa (Skt. vidyā). There are numerous spiritual practices taught in the various Dzogchen systems for awakening rigpa.

== Hindu religious traditions ==
=== Advaita Vedanta - Shankara ===
The Advaita tradition emphasizes that, since Brahman is ever-present, Brahman-knowledge is immediate and requires no 'action', that is, striving and effort, as articulated by Shankara; yet, it also prescribes elaborate preparatory practice, including yogic samadhi and contemplation on the Mahāvākyas, posing a paradox which is also recognized in other spiritual disciplines and traditions.

Classical Advaita Vedānta regards the liberated state of being Atman-Brahman as one's true identity and inherent to being human. No human action can 'produce' this liberated state, as it is what one already is. As Swami Vivekananda stated:

The Vedas cannot show you Brahman, you are That already. They can only help to take away the veil that hides truth from our eyes. The cessation of ignorance can only come when I know that God and I are one; in other words, identify yourself with Atman, not with human limitations. The idea that we are bound is only an illusion [Maya]. Freedom is inseparable from the nature of the Atman. This is ever pure, ever perfect, ever unchangeable.

— Adi Shankara's commentary on Fourth Vyasa Sutra, Swami Vivekananda

Yet, it also emphasizes human effort, the path of Jnana Yoga, a progression of study and training to realize one's true identity as Atman-Brahman and attain moksha. Whereas neo-Advaita emphasizes direct insight, traditional Advaita Vedanta entails more than self-inquiry or bare insight into one's real nature, but also includes self-restraint, textual studies and ethical perfection. It is described in classical Advaita books like Shankara's Upadesasahasri and the Vivekachudamani, which is also attributed to Shankara.

Sruti (scriptures), proper reasoning and meditation are the main sources of knowledge (vidya) for the Advaita Vedānta tradition. It teaches that correct knowledge of Atman and Brahman is achievable by svādhyāya, study of the self and of the Vedic texts, and three stages of practice: sravana (perception, hearing), manana (thinking) and nididhyasana (meditation), a three-step methodology that is rooted in the teachings of chapter 4 of the Brihadaranyaka Upanishad.

Shankara regarded the srutis as the means of knowledge of Brahman, and he was ambivalent about yogic practices and meditation, which at best may prepare one for Brahma-jnana. (Note: Neil Dalal (2021), Shankara, Stanford Encyclopedia of Philosophy) According to Rambacharan, criticising Vivekananda's presentation of yoga and samadhi as an Advaitic means of knowledge, Shankara states that the knowledge of Brahman can only be obtained from inquiry of the Shruti, and not by Yoga or samadhi, which at best can only silence the mind.

=== Ramana Maharshi - Akrama mukti ===
Ramana Maharshi made a distinction between akrama mukti, "sudden liberation", as opposed to the krama mukti, "gradual liberation" as in the Vedanta path of jnana yoga: (Note: David Godman (23 June 2008), More on Bhagavan's death experience) (Note: Rama P. Coomaraswamy: "[Krama-mukti is] to be distinguished from jîvan-mukti, the state of total and immediate liberation attained during this lifetime, and videha-mukti, the state of total liberation attained at the moment of death." See (Note: Swami Krishnananda, The Attainment of Liberation: Progressive Salvation) for more info on "gradual liberation".)

‘Some people,’ he said, ‘start off by studying literature in their youth. Then they indulge in the pleasures of the world until they are fed up with them. Next, when they are at an advanced age, they turn to books on Vedanta. They go to a guru and get initiated by him and then start the process of sravana, manana and nididhyasana, which finally culminates in samadhi. This is the normal and standard way of approaching liberation. It is called krama mukti [gradual liberation]. But I was overtaken by akrama mukti [sudden liberation] before I passed through any of the above-mentioned stages.’

=== Inchegeri Sampradaya - "the Ant's way" ===
The teachings of Bhausaheb Maharaj, the founder of the Inchegeri Sampradaya, have been called "the Ant's way", (Note: Pipeelika Mārg, or Pipilika Marg . (Note: http://nondualite.free.fr, Shri Sadguru Siddharameshwar Maharaj) Compare Stein (1991): "A fall from above is rapid, while the expression "climb from below" evokes the celebrated parable of the ant who wants to climb a mountain.") the way of meditation, (Note: sadguru.us, The Bird's way) while the teachings of Siddharameshwar Maharaj, his disciples Nisargadatta Maharaj and Ranjit Maharaj and Nisargadatta's disciple, Ramakant Maharaj have been called "the Bird's Way", (Note: Bihangam Mārg, or Vihangam Marg,) the direct path to Self-discovery:

The way of meditation is a long arduous path while the Bird's Way is a clear direct path of Self investigation, Self exploration, and using thought or concepts as an aid to understanding and Self-Realization. Sometimes this approach is also called the Reverse Path. What Reverse Path indicates is the turning around of one's attention away from objectivity to the more subjective sense of one's Beingness. (Note: Compare Jinul's "tracing back the radiance".) With the Bird's Way, first one's mind must be made subtle. This is generally done with some initial meditation on a mantra or phrase which helps the aspirant to step beyond the mental/conceptual body, using a concept to go beyond conceptualization.

The terms appear in the Varaha Upanishad, Chapter IV:

34. (The Rishi) Suka is a Mukta (emancipated person). (The Rishi) Vamadeva is a Mukta. There are no others (who have attained emancipation) than through these (viz., the two paths of these two Rishis). Those brave men who follow the path of Suka in this world become Sadyo-Muktas (viz., emancipated) immediately after (the body wear away);

35. While those who always follow the path of Vamadeva (i.e., Vedanta) in this world are subject again and again to rebirths and attain Krama (gradual) emancipation, through Yoga, Sankhya and Karmas associated with Sattva (Guna).

36. Thus there are two paths laid down by the Lord of Devas (viz.,) the Suka and Vamadeva paths. The Suka path is called the bird’s path; while the Vamadeva path is called the ant’s path. (Note: swamji.com, Seven Bhumikas)

== See also ==
- Illuminationism – Islamic philosophy introduced by Suhrawardi
- Mushi-dokugo – Zen Buddhist term
- Shattari – Sufi mystic order in Sunni Islam
