= Shaolin Temple UK =

Martial arts school in London, England

Coordinates: 51.5599°N 0.1372°W

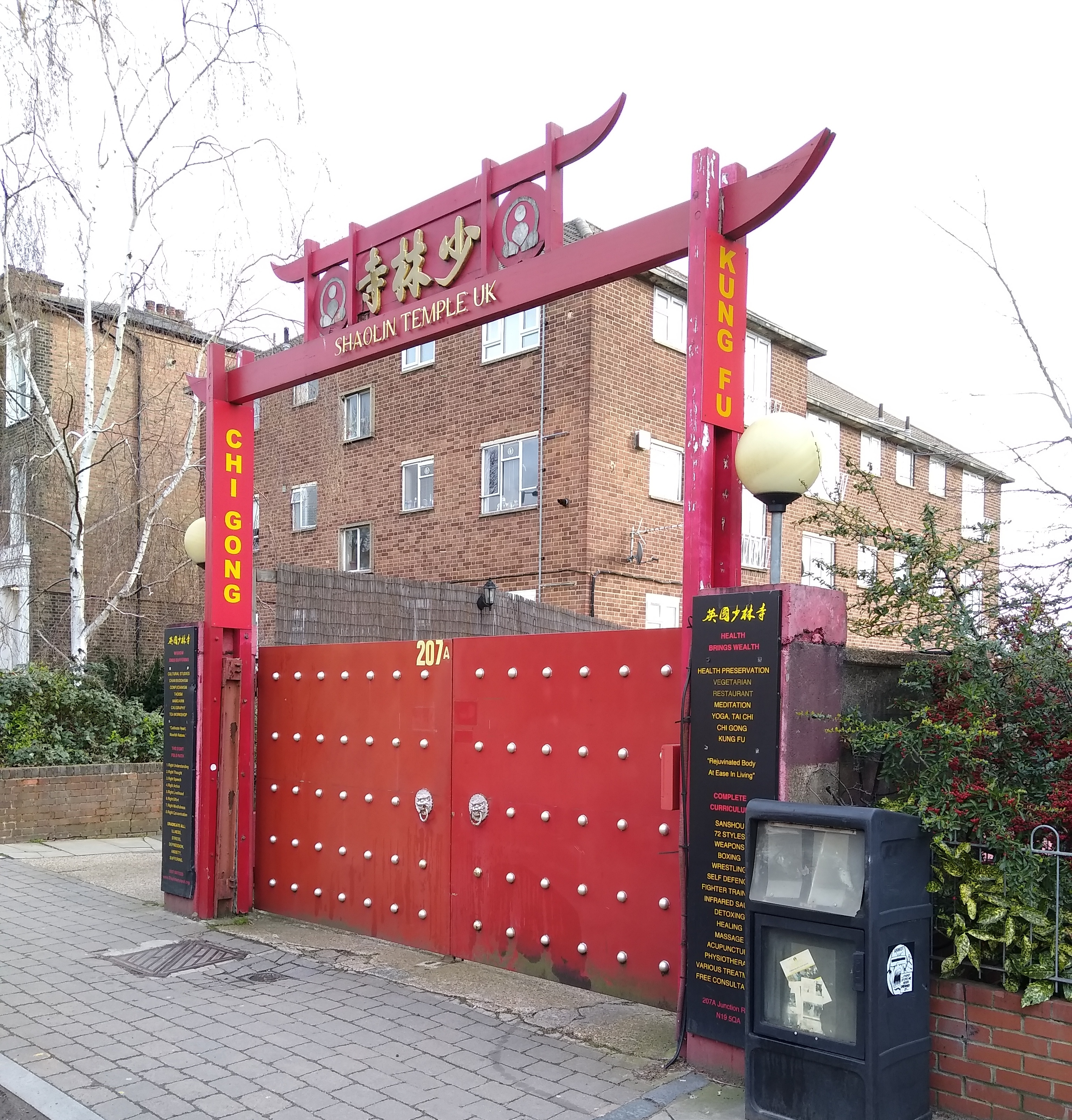

Religion
- Affiliation: Mahayana Buddhist

Location
- Location: 207a Junction Road, Tufnell Park, London, N19 5QA
- Country: United Kingdom
- Interactive map of Shaolin Temple UK

Architecture
- Founder: Shi Yanzi
- Completed: 2000

Website
- http://www.shaolintempleuk.org/

Shaolin Temple UK
- Traditional Chinese: 英國少林寺
- Simplified Chinese: 英国少林寺
Transcriptions
Standard Mandarin
- Hanyu Pinyin: Yīngguó Shàolín Sì

Shaolin Temple UK is a martial arts school and centre for study of Shaolin culture, in particular Gong Fu-Ch'an, Qigong and Chan Buddhist Meditation. It was founded in 2000 by Shaolin monk Shi Yanzi, and is located in North London, England, between the Tufnell Park and Archway Northern Line tube stations.

Shaolin Temple UK is an official emissary of the 1,500-year-old Shaolin Temple in Henan Province in China, by direct mandate from the Abbot Venerable Shi Yong Xin.

Classes are taught by Shi Yanlei and 35th generation disciples: Shi Hengdao, Hengjiu, Hengshang and Hengdi.

The school emphasises balanced training both in the external and internal martial arts. Students typically train both in Gong Fu and Qigong. Notable figures to have trained at the school include actor Andrew Koji.

== Gong Fu-Ch'an ==
Shaolin Temple UK is most well known for Gong Fu (or Kung Fu), and participates in national and international fighting competitions, as well as interclub fights with Muay Thai fighters.

Gong Fu classes focus on Sanshou training - one to one hand-to-hand combat - which can be considered to be China's form of kickboxing. This is the style of fighting which the temple's students use in competition. The temple's founder and main teacher Shifu Yanzi was Chinese National Champion for 15 years in the art.

Students first train for three months in "Preparation" class, with a focus on building strength, stamina, flexibility, and learning fundamentals. Beginner level students train without contact. Students are encouraged to try to pass a quarterly grading exam at their first opportunity. Shaolin Temple UK's higher classes are semi-contact and full-contact, students train with gloves and pads, and also spar.

== Qigong ==
There are beginners and advanced Qigong classes. Beginners practice a form (sequence of movements) called Ba Duan Jin, which translates as "Eight Pieces of Brocade", so called because the form consists of 8 movements. While advanced students will practice body conditioning using bamboo sticks, and an advanced form featuring 12 movements.

== Chan Buddhism ==
Chan is a branch of Chinese Buddhism in which talking in teaching is not encouraged, instead students are encouraged to be sharp and quick learning observers. These qualities are shared with fighters and martial artists.

Chan Buddhist training involves zuochan (sitting meditation) and walking meditation.

Although there are also separate Chan Meditation classes held, it is also emphasised that Gong Fu training is in fact inseparable from Chan Buddhism in its essence and goal.

== Other activities ==
Other activities taught at Shaolin Temple UK include:

- Tai Chi forms
- Weapons forms
- Mandarin Chinese lessons
- Chinese calligraphy

== See also ==
- Shaolin Monastery

== External links and articles ==
- Shaolin Temple Overseas Headquarters
- Shaolin Temple UK Website
- Shifu Yan Lei's website - Master who teaches at STUK has a separate website, which includes training plans
- Shifu Yan Lei's Brighton Martial Arts Club
