= Shaolin Monastery =

Chan Buddhist temple in Dengfeng, China

- 少林寺
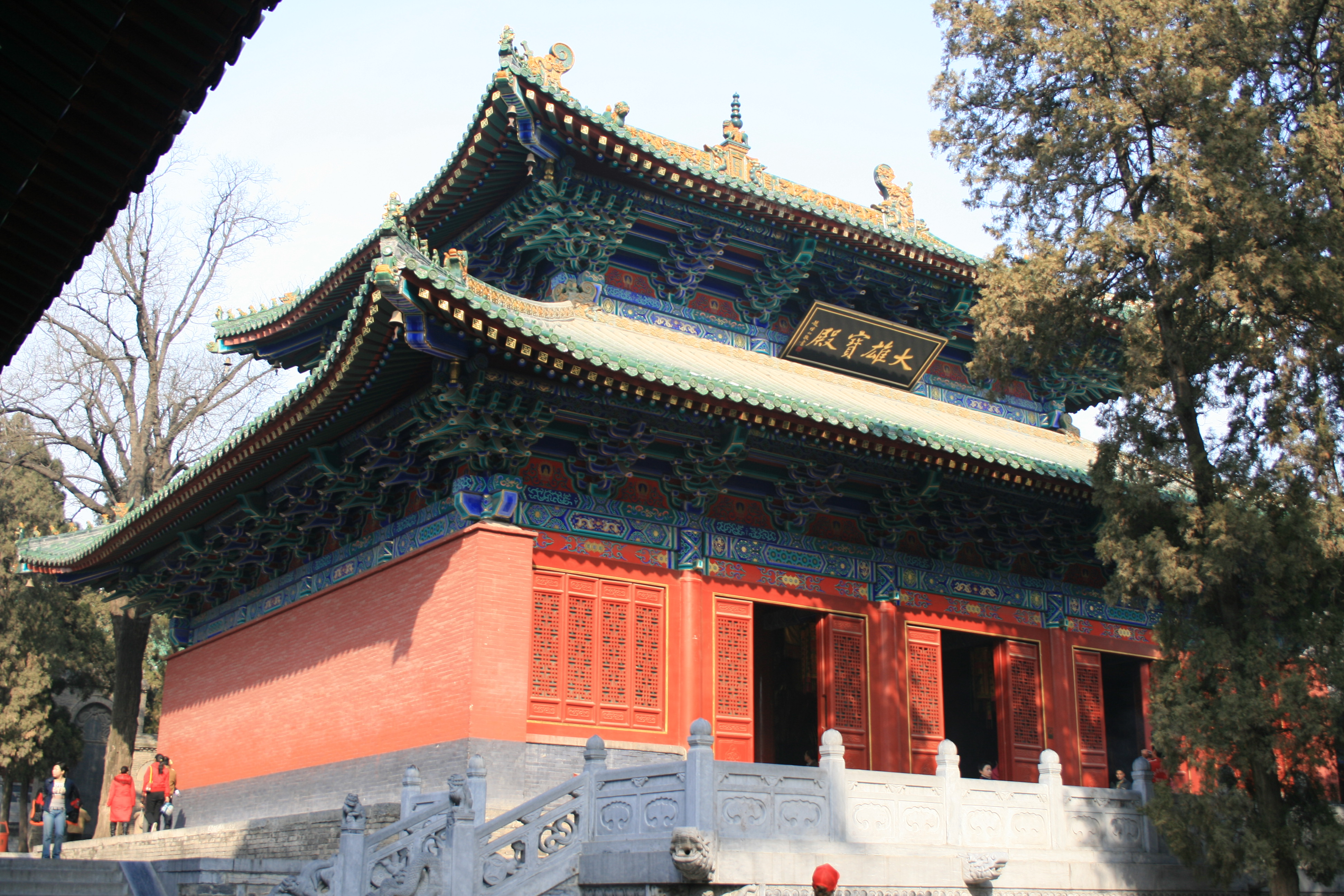
- Daxiongbao Dian, the monastery's main building, in 2007

- Location within Henan

Religion
- Affiliation: Chan Buddhism
- Status: Active

Location
- Location: Dengfeng, Zhengzhou, Henan, China
- Coordinates: 34°30′29″N 112°56′07″E

Architecture
- Style: Chinese architecture
- Established: 495; 1531 years ago

Website
- shaolin.org.cn

UNESCO World Heritage Site
- Location: China
- Part of: Historic Monuments of Dengfeng in "The Centre of Heaven and Earth"
- Criteria: Cultural: (iv)
- Reference: 1305-005
- Inscription: 2010 (34th Session)

Shaolin Monastery
- "Shaolin Temple" in Chinese
- Chinese: 少林寺
- Literal meaning: "Temple of Shao[shi Mountain] Woods"
Transcriptions
Standard Mandarin
- Hanyu Pinyin: Shàolín sì
- Wade–Giles: Shao^{4}-lin^{2} ssŭ^{4}
- IPA: [ʂâʊ.lǐn sɨ̂]
Wu
- Romanization: Soh^{去} lin^{平} zy^{去}
Yue: Cantonese
- Yale Romanization: Siuh-làhm jih
- Jyutping: Siu6-lam4 zi6
- IPA: [siw˨.lɐm˩ tsi˨]
Southern Min
- Tâi-lô: Siàu-lîm sī

Shaolin Monastery (少林寺; shàolín-sì), also known as Shaolin Temple, is a Mahayana Buddhist monastic institution associated with the development of Chan Buddhism and Shaolin kung fu. It is located at the foot of Wuru Peak of the Mount Song mountain range in Dengfeng, Zhengzhou prefecture, in Henan, China.

The name reflects its location in the ancient grove (林; lín) of Mount Shaoshi, in the hinterland of the Mount Song range. (Note: Of the several etymologies, Shaolin is always taken as a compound of "lin", ("grove"), due to its use in Bei-lin and Ta-lin, toponyms of nearby geographic features. "Shao-" introduces some uncertainty, as it may have many meanings. Currently, the most popular meaning is as an abbreviation of Shaosi, as presented in Shahar 2008, p. 11: "Shaosi grove". References from art and literature usually present this grove as bamboo. Currently, the area is free of any groves, but Shahar points out that this could not always have been the case.) Mount Song occupied was recognized as one of China's sacred mountains as early as the 1st century BC, when it was proclaimed one of the Five Holy Peaks. It is located some 48 km (30 mi) southeast of Luoyang, the former capital of the Northern Wei Dynasty (386–534), and 72 km (45 mi) southwest of Zhengzhou, the modern capital of Henan Province.

The first Shaolin abbot, Batuo, translated Buddhist texts and taught Buddhist doctrines to hundreds of his followers. According to legend, Bodhidharma, the 28th patriarch of Mahayana Buddhism, arrived at the Shaolin Temple in 527 from India. He spent nine years meditating in a cave of the Wuru Peak and initiated the Chan tradition at the Shaolin Temple. Thereafter, Bodhidharma was honored as the first patriarch of Chan Buddhism.

The Temple's historical architectural complex has been inscribed on the UNESCO World Heritage List. Apart from its contributions to the development of Chinese Buddhism and to its historical, cultural, and artistic heritage, the temple is notable for its martial arts tradition. The monastery is associated with the practice and transmission of Shaolin kung fu.

The monastery's association with Chan Buddhism (禅; 禪; chán), martial arts (武; wǔ), Buddhist art (艺; 藝; yì), and traditional Chinese medicine (医; 醫; yī) has allowed its culture to spread across the world.

== History ==
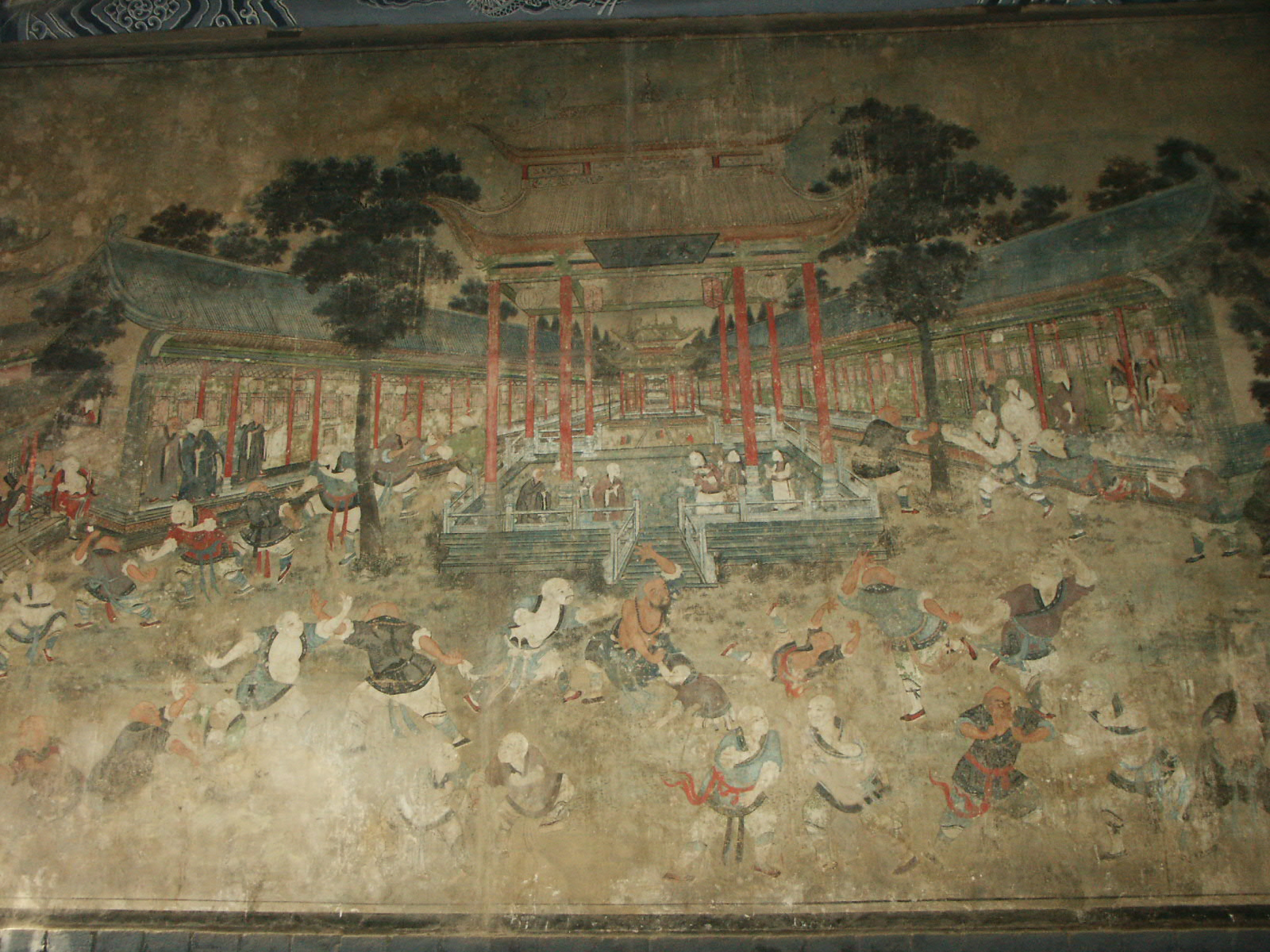
Mural painting from the 1830s in Baiyi Hall of Shaolin Monastery

=== Northern Wei and Northern Zhou dynasties ===
Batuo, also referred to in the Chinese sources as Fotuo and in Sanskrit as Buddhabhadra, had enjoyed the sponsorship of the Emperor Xiaowen of Northern Wei since arriving in Pingcheng via the Silk Road, around the year 490. Yang Xuanzhi, in the Record of the Buddhist Monasteries of Luoyang (AD 547), and Li Xian, in the Ming Yitongzhi (1461), concur with Daoxuan's location and attribution. The Jiaqing Chongxiu Yitongzhi (1843) specifies that this monastery, located in the province of Henan, was built in the twentieth year of the Taihe era of the Northern Wei dynasty, that is, the monastery was built in AD 495.

Under Batuo's leadership, the monastery became a centre for Buddhist scripture translation and study. It also became a meeting place for Buddhist monks and teachers. Historical sources on the early origins of Shaolin kung fu show that at this time, martial arts practice existed in the temple. Batuo's teachings were continued by his two disciples, Sengchou (僧稠; sēngchóu, 480–560) and Huiguang (慧光; huìguāng, 487–536).

In the first year of the Yongping era (506), the Indian monks Ratnamati (勒那摩提; Lenamoti) and Bodhiruci (菩提流支; Putiliuzhi) came to Shaolin to set up a scripture translation hall. Together with Huiguang, they translated master Vasubandhu's (世親; Shìqīn) commentary on the Ten Stages Sutra, an early and influential Mahayana Buddhist scripture. After that, Huiguang promoted the Vinaya in Four Parts (四分律; sì fēn lǜ; Sanskrit: Dharmagupta-Vinaya), which formed the theoretical basis of the Luzong (律宗; lǜzōng) School of Buddhism, formed during the Tang dynasty by Daoxuan (596–667).

In the third year of the Xiaochang era (527) of Emperor Xiaoming of Northern Wei, Bodhidharma, the 28th patriarch of Mahayana Buddhism in India, came to the Shaolin Temple. The Indian arrived as a Chan Buddhist missionary and traveled for decades throughout China before settling on Mount Song in the 520s. Bodhidharma's teachings were primarily based on the Lankavatara Sutra, which contains the conversation between Gautama Buddha and Bodhisattva Mahamatti, who is considered the first patriarch of the Chan tradition.

Using the teachings of Batuo and his disciples as a foundation, Bodhidharma introduced Chan Buddhism, and the Shaolin Temple community gradually grew to become the center of Chinese Chan Buddhism. Bodhidharma's teachings were transmitted to his disciple Huike, who, the legend says, cut off his arm to show his determination and devotion to the teachings of his master. Huike was forced to leave the temple during the persecution of Buddhism and Daoism (574–580) by Emperor Wu of Northern Zhou. In 580, Emperor Jing of Northern Zhou restored the temple and renamed it Zhi'ao Temple (陟岵寺; zhìhù sì).

The idea that Bodhidharma founded martial arts at the Shaolin Temple was spread in the 20th century. However, martial arts historians have shown this legend stems from a 17th-century qigong manual known as the Yijin Jing. The oldest available copy was published in 1827. The composition of the text itself has been dated to 1624. Even then, the association of Bodhidharma with martial arts only became widespread as a result of the 1904–1907 serialization of the novel The Travels of Lao Ts'an in Illustrated Fiction Magazine:

One of the most recently invented and familiar of the Shaolin historical narratives is a story that claims that the Indian monk Bodhidharma, the supposed founder of Chinese Chan (Zen) Buddhism, introduced boxing into the monastery as a form of exercise around a.d. 525. This story first appeared in a popular novel, The Travels of Lao T'san, published as a series in a literary magazine in 1907. This story was quickly picked up by others and spread rapidly through publication in a popular contemporary boxing manual, Secrets of Shaolin Boxing Methods, and the first Chinese physical culture history published in 1919. As a result, it has enjoyed vast oral circulation and is one of the most "sacred" of the narratives shared within Chinese and Chinese-derived martial arts. That this story is clearly a twentieth-century invention is confirmed by writings going back at least 250 years earlier, which mention both Bodhidharma and martial arts but make no connection between the two.

Other scholars see an earlier connection between Bodhidharma and the Shaolin Monastery. The monk and his disciples are said to have lived at a spot about a mile from the Shaolin Temple that is now a small nunnery. Around AD 547, the Record of the Buddhist Monasteries says Bodhidharma visited the area near Mount Song. In AD 645, The Continuation of the Biographies of Eminent Monks describes him as being active in the Mount Song region. Around AD 710, Bodhidharma is identified specifically with the Shaolin Temple (Precious Record of Dharma's Transmission or Chuanfa Baoji) and writes of his sitting facing a wall in meditation for many years. It also speaks of Huike's many trials in his efforts to receive instruction from Bodhidharma. In 1004, a work embellishes the Bodhidharma legends with great detail. A stele inscription at the Shaolin Monastery dated to 728 AD reveals Bodhidharma residing on Mount Song. Another stele from AD 798 speaks of Huike seeking instruction from Bodhidharma. Another engraving, dated to 1209, depicts the barefoot saint holding a shoe, according to the ancient legend of Bodhidharma. A plethora of 13th- and 14th-century steles feature Bodhidharma in various roles. One 13th-century image shows him riding a fragile stalk across the Yangtze River. In 1125, a temple was constructed in his honor at the Shaolin Monastery.

=== Sui, Tang, Wu Zhou, and Song dynasties ===
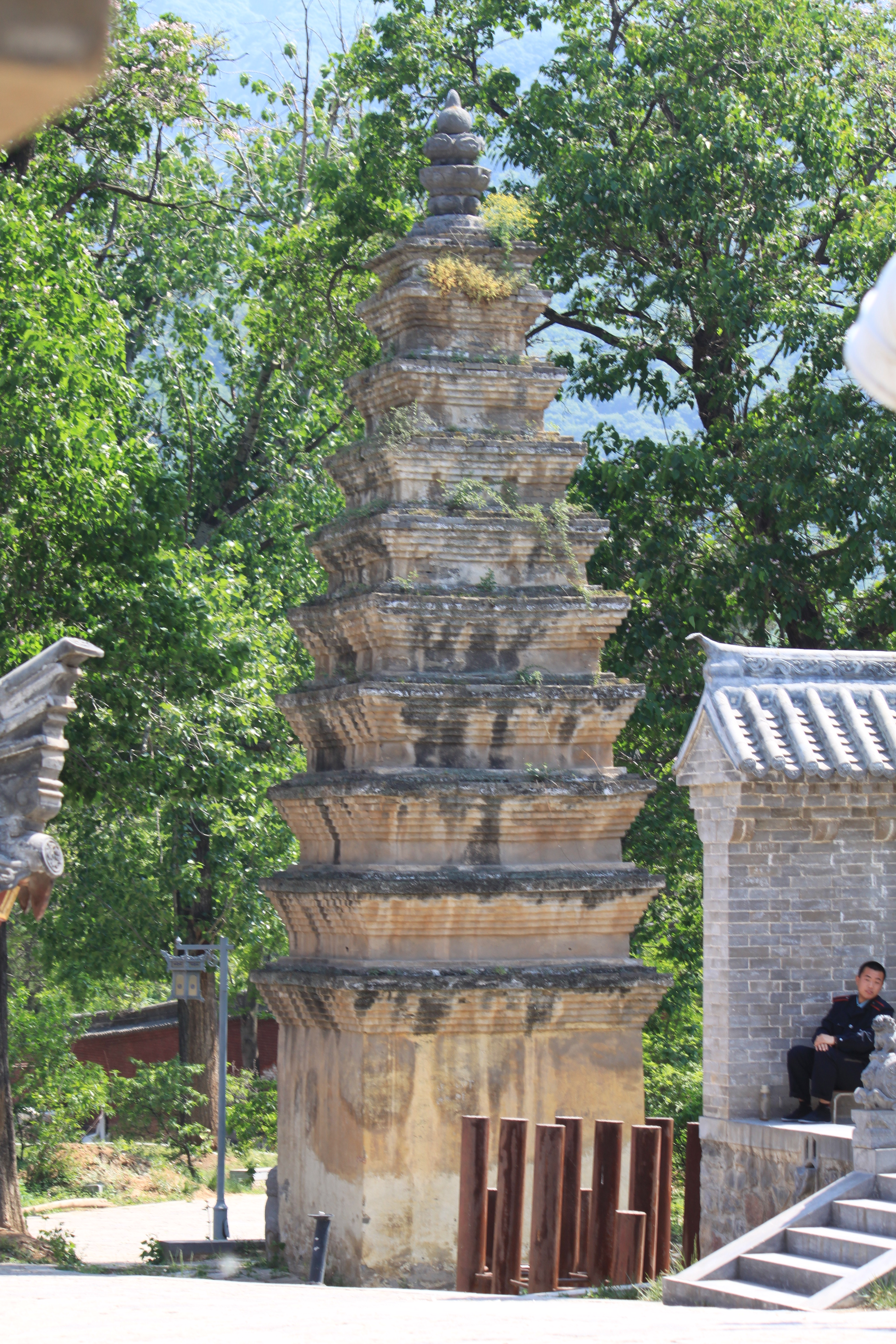
Maitreya Pagoda, dating from the year 1087, Song dynasty

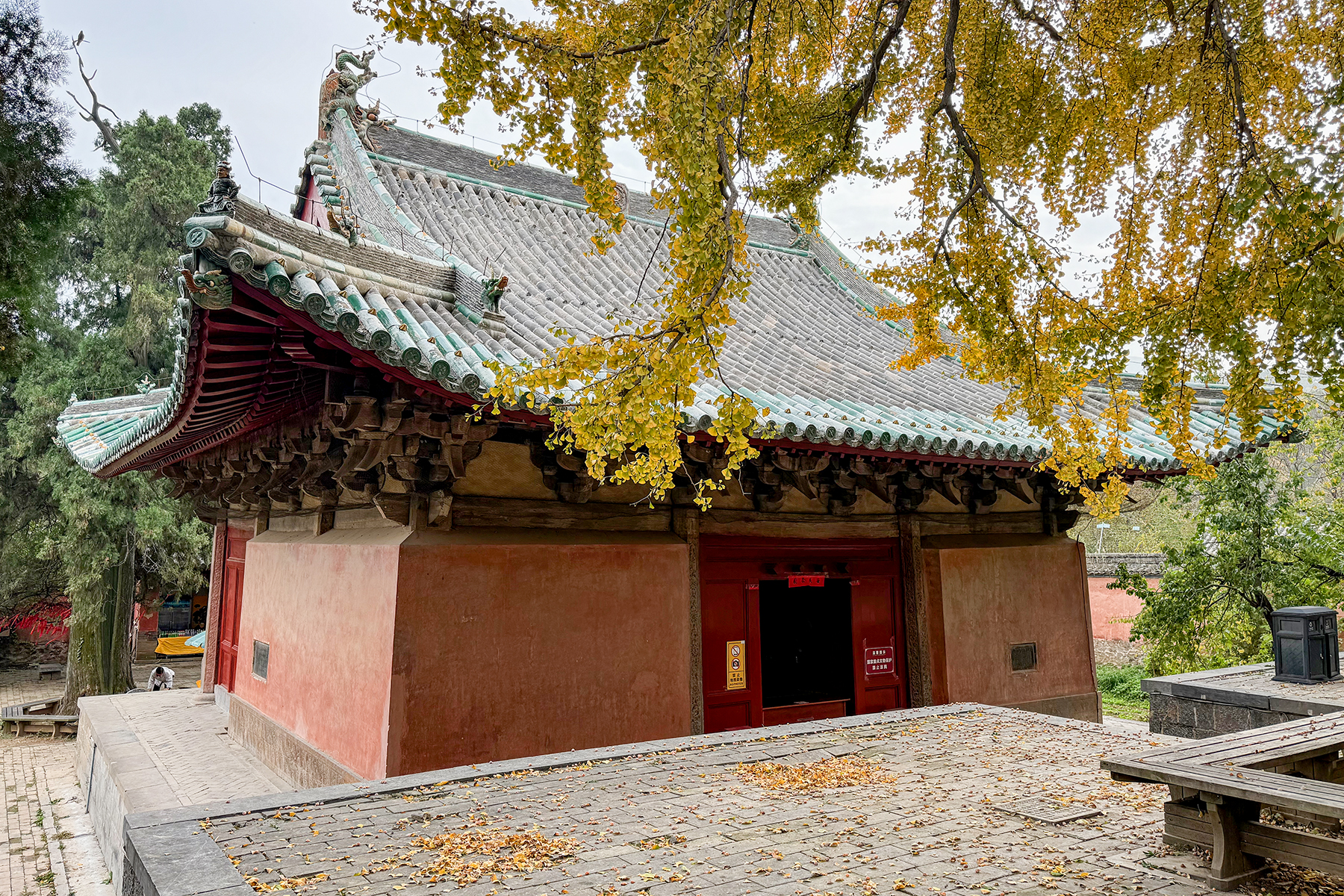
Chuzu Temple of Shaolin Monastery, built in 1125, Song dynasty

Emperor Wen of Sui, who was a Buddhist himself, returned the temple's original name and offered to its community 100 hectares of land. Shaolin thus became a large temple with hundreds of hectares of fertile land and large properties. It was once again the center of Chan Buddhism, with monks from all over China visiting regularly.

At the end of the Sui dynasty, the Shaolin Temple, with its huge monastery properties, became the target of thieves and bandits. The monks organized forces within their community to protect the temple and fight against the intruders. At the beginning of the Tang dynasty, thirteen Shaolin monks helped Li Shimin, the future second emperor of the Tang dynasty, in his fight against Wang Shichong. They captured Shichong's nephew Wang Renze, whose army was stationed in the Cypress Valley. In 626, Li Shimin, later known as Emperor Taizong, sent an official letter of gratitude to the Shaolin community for the help they provided in his fight against Shichong and thus the establishment of the Tang dynasty.

According to legend, Emperor Taizong granted the Shaolin Temple extra land and a special "imperial dispensation" to consume meat and alcohol during the Tang dynasty. If true, this would have made Shaolin the only temple in China that did not prohibit alcohol. Regardless of historical veracity, these rituals are not practiced today. This legend is not corroborated in any period documents, such as the Shaolin Stele, erected in AD 728. The stele does not list any such imperial dispensation as reward for the monks' assistance during the campaign against Wang Shichong; only land and a water mill are granted. The Tang dynasty also established several Shaolin branch monasteries throughout the country and formulated policies for Shaolin monks and soldiers to assist local governments and regular military troops. The Shaolin Temple also became a place where emperors and high officials would come for temporary reclusion. Emperor Gaozong of Tang and Empress Wu Zetian often visited the temple for good luck and made large donations. Empress Wu also paid several visits to the temple to discuss Chan philosophy with high monk Tan Zong. During the Tang and Song dynasties, the Shaolin Temple was extremely prosperous. It had more than 14,000 acres of land, 540 acres of temple grounds, more than 5,000 rooms, and over 2,000 monks. The Chan Buddhist School, founded by Bodhidharma, flourished during the Tang dynasty and was a major Buddhist school.

Information about the first century of the Northern Song dynasty is scarce. The rulers of Song supported the development of Buddhism, and Chan established itself as dominant over other Buddhist schools. Around 1093, Chan master Baoen (报恩; bào'ēn) promoted the Caodong school in the Shaolin Temple and achieved what is known in Buddhist history as "revolutionary turn into Chan". This meant that the Shaolin Temple officially became a Chan Buddhist Temple, while up to that point it was a Lǜzōng temple specialized in Vinaya, with a Chan Hall.

=== Yuan, Ming, and Qing dynasties ===
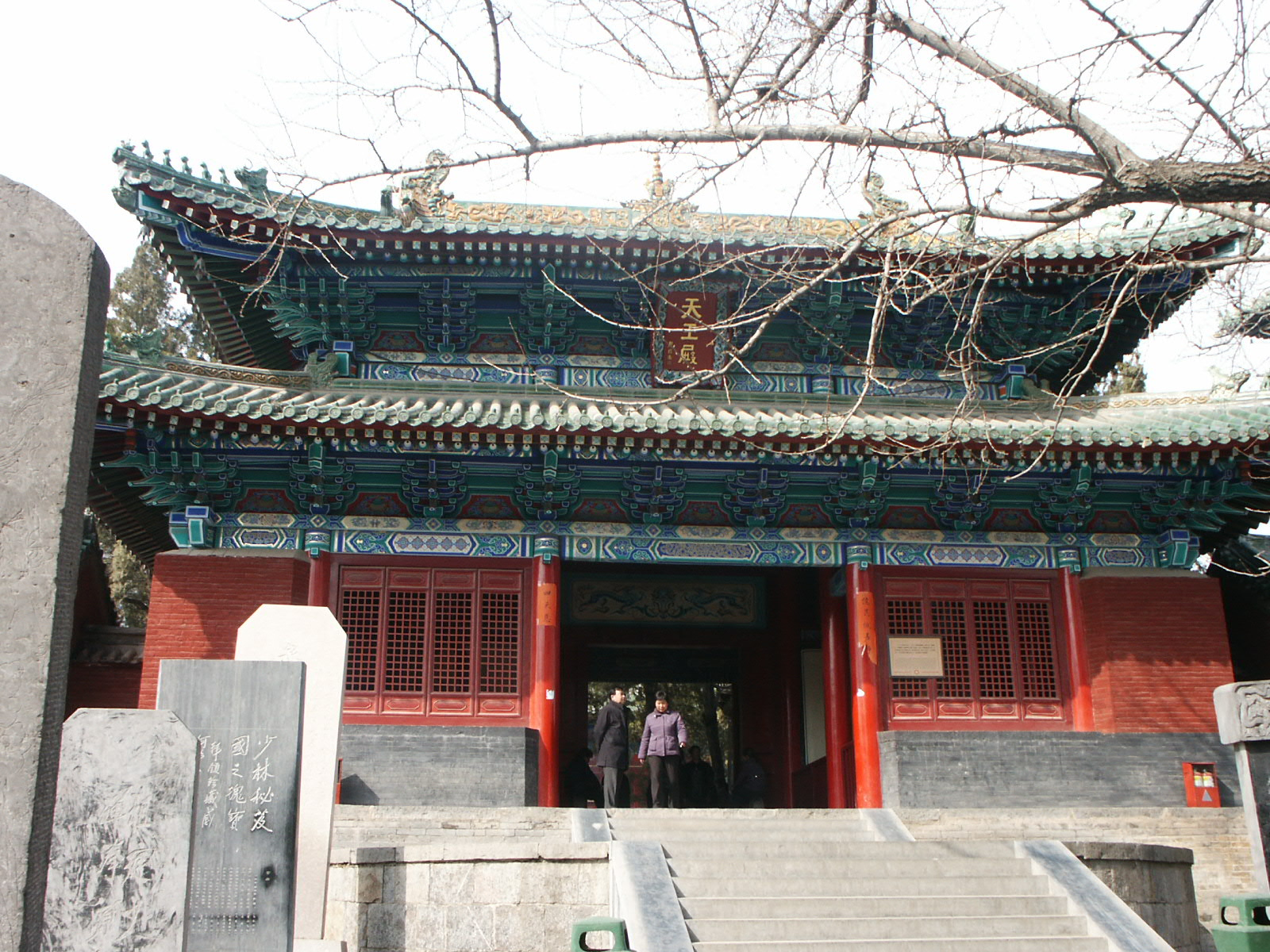
Tianwang dian of Shaolin Monastery, first built during the Yuan dynasty and renovated many times during the Ming and Qing dynasties

At the beginning of the Yuan dynasty, Emperor Shizu of Yuan installed the monk Xueting Fuyu (1203–1275) as the abbot of Shaolin and put him in charge of all the temples in the Mount Song area. During this period, the abbot undertook construction work, including the building of the Bell Tower and the Drum Tower. He also introduced the generational lineage system of the Shaolin disciples through a 70-character poem—each character in line corresponding to the name of the next generation of disciples. In 1260, Fuyu was honored with the title of the Divine Buddhist Master, and in 1312, posthumously named Duke of Jin (晉國公; jìn guó gōng) by the Yuan emperor.

The fall of the Yuan dynasty and the establishment of the Ming dynasty brought much unrest, in which the temple community needed to defend itself from rebels and bandits. During the Red Turban Rebellion in the 14th century, bandits ransacked the monastery for its real or supposed valuables, destroying much of the temple and driving the monks away. The monastery was likely abandoned from 1351 or 1356 (the most likely dates for the attack) to at least 1359, when government troops retook Henan. The events of this period would later figure heavily in 16th-century legends of the temple's patron saint Vajrapani, with the story being changed to claim a victory for the monks, rather than a defeat.

With the establishment of the Ming dynasty in the mid-14th century, the monastic community was re-established, and many monks who fled from the Red Turban attacks returned. At the beginning of the Ming dynasty, the government did not advocate martial arts. During the reign of the Jiajing Emperor, Japanese pirates harassed China's coastal areas, and generals Yu Dayou and Qi Jiguang led their troops against the pirates. During his stay in Fujian, Qi Jiguang convened martial artists from all over China, including local Shaolin monks, to develop a set of boxing and staff fighting techniques to be used against Japanese pirates. Following the monks' participation in campaigns against Japanese pirates, the government renovated the temple on a large scale, and Shaolin enjoyed certain privileges, such as food tax exemption, granted by the government. Afterward, Shaolin monks were recruited by the Ming government at least six times to participate in wars. Due to their participation in military campaigns, the imperial court built monuments and buildings for the Shaolin Temple on numerous occasions. This also helped strengthen the association between the monastery and martial arts. During the mid-16th century, the monastery experienced a period of influence during the mid-16th century and held its position as the central place of the Caodong School of Chan Buddhism.

In 1641, rebel forces led by Li Zicheng sacked the monastery due to the monks' support of the Ming dynasty and the possible threat they posed to the rebels. This effectively destroyed the temple's fighting force. The temple fell into ruin and was home to only a few monks until the early 18th century, when the government of the Qing dynasty patronized and restored it.

During the Qing dynasty, Shaolin Temple was favored by Qing emperors. In the 43rd year of the Kangxi Emperor's reign (1704), the emperor gifted a tablet to the temple, with the characters 少林寺 (shàolín sì) engraved on it in his calligraphy (originally hung in the Heavenly King Hall and later moved by the Mountain Gate). In the 13th year of the Yongzheng Emperor's reign (1735), important reconstructions were financed by the court, including the rebuilding of the gate and the Thousand Buddha's Hall. In the 15th year of his rule (1750), the Qianlong Emperor personally visited Shaolin Temple, stayed at the abbot's room overnight, and wrote poems and tablet inscriptions.

A well-known story of the temple from this period is that it was destroyed by the Qing government for supposed anti-Qing activities. Variously said to have taken place in 1647 under the Shunzhi Emperor, in 1674, 1677, or 1714 under the Kangxi Emperor, or in 1728 or 1732 under the Yongzheng Emperor, this destruction is also supposed to have helped spread Shaolin martial arts throughout China by means of the five fugitive monks. Some accounts claim that a supposed southern Shaolin Temple was destroyed instead of, or in addition to, the temple in Henan: Ju Ke, in the Qing bai lei chao (1917), locates this temple in Fujian. These stories commonly appear in legendary or popular accounts of martial history and in wuxia fiction.

While these latter accounts are popular among martial artists and often serve as origin stories for various martial arts styles, they are viewed by scholars as fictional. The accounts are known through often inconsistent 19th-century secret society histories and popular literature, and also appear to draw on both Fujianese folklore and popular narratives, such as the classical novel Water Margin. Modern scholarly attention to the tales is mainly concerned with their role as folklore.

=== Republic of China ===
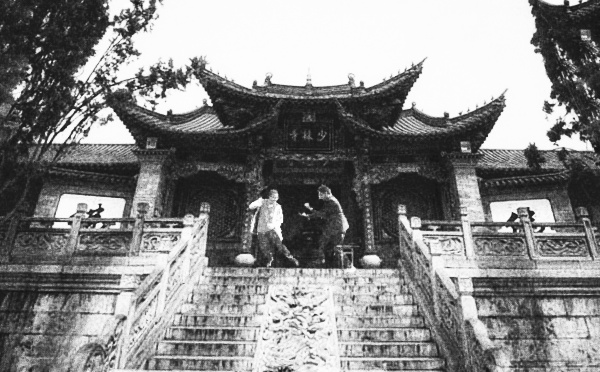
19th–20th-century photo of Shaolin Monastery

In the early days of the Republic of China, the Shaolin Temple was repeatedly hit by wars. In 1912, monk Yunsong Henglin from the Dengfeng County Monks Association was elected by the local government as the head of the Shaolin Militia (Shaolin Guarding Corps). He organized the guards and trained them in combat skills to maintain local order. In the autumn of 1920, famine and drought hit Henan province, which led to thieves surging throughout the area and endangering the local community. Henglin led the militia to fight the bandits on different occasions, thus enabling dozens of villages in the temple's surroundings to live and work in peace.

In the late 1920s, Shaolin monks became embroiled in the warlords' feuds that swept the plains of northern China. They sided with General Fan Zhongxiu (1888–1930), who had studied martial arts at Shaolin Temple as a child, against Shi Yousan (1891–1940). Fan was defeated and, in the spring of 1928, Yousan's troops entered Dengfeng and Shaolin Temple, which served as Fan Zongxiu's headquarters. On 15 March, Feng Yuxiang's subordinate Shi Yousan set fire to the monastery, destroying some of its ancient towers and halls. The flames partially damaged the Shaolin Monastery Stele, the Dharma Hall, the Heavenly King Hall, Daxiongbao Hall, Bell Tower, Drum Tower, Sixth Ancestor Hall, Chan Hall, and other buildings, causing the death of several monks. A large number of cultural relics and 5,480 volumes of Buddhist scriptures were destroyed in the fire.

Japan's activities in Manchuria in the early 1930s made the National Government very worried. The military then launched a strong patriotic movement to defend the country and resist the enemy. The Nanjing Central Martial Arts Center and Wushu Institute, together with other martial arts institutions, were established around the country as part of this movement. The government also organized martial arts events such as "Martial arts returning to Shaolin". This particular event served to encourage people to remember the importance of patriotism by celebrating the contribution of Shaolin martial arts to the country's defense from foreign invasion on numerous occasions throughout history.

=== People's Republic of China ===
Since the founding of the People's Republic of China in 1949, the state officially became atheist, with roughly half of the population identifying as nonreligious or atheist. Some state-monitored religions and practices were allowed, while others, like Tibetan Buddhism, were persecuted after the takeover of Tibet by the Chinese military in 1959.

During the Cultural Revolution, the monks of Shaolin Temple were forced to return to secular life, Buddha statues were destroyed, and temple properties were invaded. After this period ended, the Shaolin Temple was repaired and rebuilt. The buildings and other material heritage that were destroyed, including the Daxiongbao Hall and the stone portraying "Bodhidharma facing the wall", were reconstructed according to their originals. Others, such as the ancient martial arts training ground, the Pagoda Forest, and some stone carvings that survived, remain in their original state. In December 1996, Chuzu Temple and Shaolin Temple Pagoda Forest (No. 4-89) were listed as national key cultural relic protection units. The Shaolin Temple leadership aimed for its historical architectural complex to become a United Nations World Heritage site in order to obtain annual funding for maintenance and development from the UN. After repeated submissions, their application was finally accepted by the 34th World Heritage Committee on 1 August 2010. UNESCO reviewed and approved eight sites and eleven architectural complexes, including Shaolin's Resident Hall, Pagoda Forest, and Chuzu Temple as World Cultural Heritage.

In 1994, the temple registered its name as a trademark. In the late 2000s, Shi Yongxin began authorizing Shaolin branches outside of mainland China in what has been called a franchise scheme. The branches are run by current and former monks and allow dispersion of Shaolin culture and study of Shaolin kung fu around the world. As of January 2011, Yongxin and the temple operated over forty companies in cities across the world, including London and Berlin, which have purchased land and property.

In 2018, for the first time in its 1,500-year history, the Shaolin Monastery raised the national flag of China as part of a "patriotism drive" under the new National Religious Affairs Administration, a part of the United Front Work Department of the Chinese Communist Party (CCP), which "oversees propaganda efforts as well as relations with the global Chinese diaspora". Senior theology lecturer Sze Chi Chan of Hong Kong Baptist University interpreted this move as CCP general secretary Xi Jinping making an example of the Shaolin Monastery to send a message to other temples and the Chinese Catholic Church.

== Governance ==
The monastery was historically led by an abbot. However, the monastery's governance structure has changed under the People's Republic of China. It is currently led by a committee composed primarily of government officials. The treasurer is appointed by the government, and as such, the abbot has little control over monastery finances. The monastery splits its profits with Dengfeng: the municipality takes two-thirds of the profits, and the monastery retains one-third.

=== Selected list of abbots ===
- Buddhabhadra (跋陀), 495
- Shi Xingzheng (释正行), 1986-1987
- Shi Yongxin (释永信), 1999–2025
- Shi Yinle (释印乐), 2025–

== Acknowledgements ==
- In 2004, the California State House of Representatives and Senate passed two votes to officially establish 21 March as California Songshan Shaolin Temple Day.
- In 2007, the temple was proclaimed as a National 5A-level Scenic Spot, a Global Low-carbon Ecological Scenic Spot, a patriotism education base for religious circles of the People's Republic of China, and an education base for respecting and caring for the elderly of the People's Republic of China.
- On 1 August 2010, during the UNESCO 34th World Heritage Committee, eight buildings, including Shaolin Temple, Pagoda Forest, and Chuzu Temple, were listed as World Cultural Heritage sites.
- In April 2013, the Shaolin Temple Sutra Pavilion was selected as a National Key Protection Unit for Ancient Books.
- In May 2013, the State Council of the People's Republic of China listed the ancient buildings of Shaolin Temple (No. 7-1162) as the seventh batch of national key cultural relic protection units.

== Shaolin culture ==
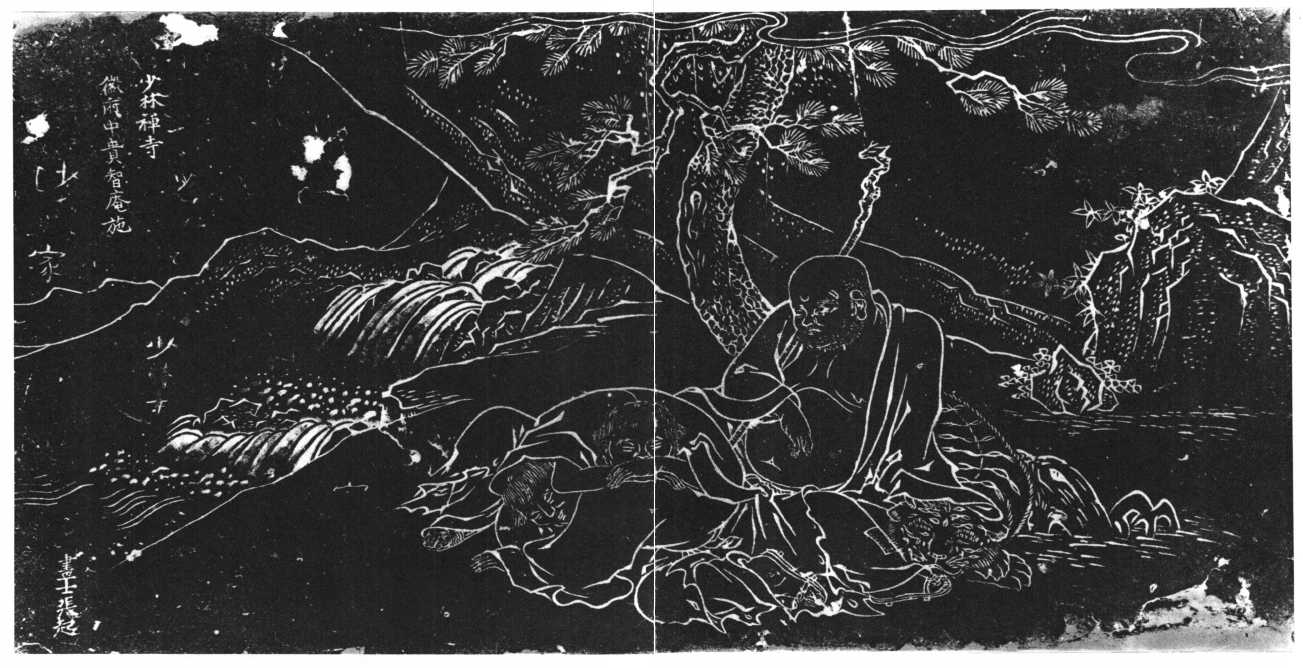
Shaolin Monastery's "Four-legged sleep" (Chinese: 四睡图) engraving

=== Heritage culture ===
The Shaolin Temple's culture is deeply rooted in Mahayana Buddhism, while the practice of Chan Buddhism is the monastery's religious tradition, and finally, the martial arts, traditional medicine, and art are its manifestations. During its historical development, the temple's cultural traditions have also been influenced by Confucianism and Daoism.

The monastery organises cultural programmes that are open to individuals regardless of cultural, social, and religious values. The programmes offer an introduction to its meditation practices, medicine and martial arts, as well as recreational activities like calligraphy, art and archery.

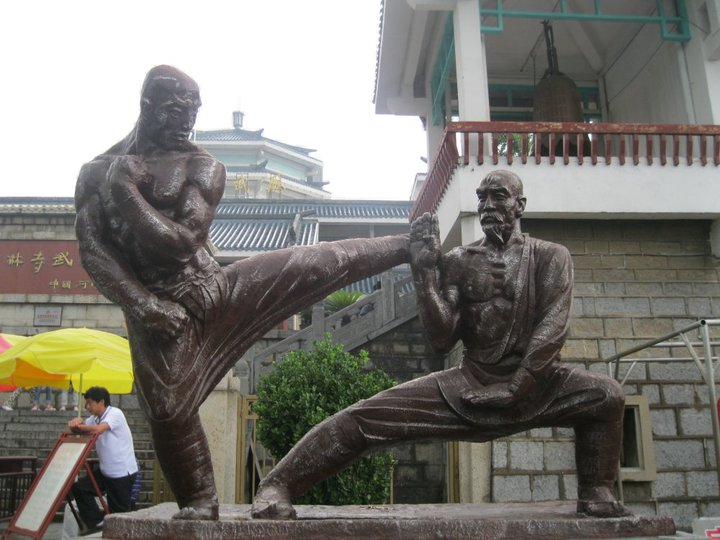
Statue depicting Shaolin kung fu, outside the gates of the Kung-Fu Show theater

Shaolin kung fu is manifested through a system of different skills that are based on attack and defense movements with the form (套路; tàolù) as its unit. One form is a combination of different movements. The structure of movements is founded on ancient Chinese medical knowledge, which is compatible with the laws of body movement. Within the temple, the forms are taught with a focus on integration of the principles of complementarity and opposition. This means that Shaolin kung fu integrates dynamic and static components, yin and yang, hardness and softness, etc.

The Shaolin community has invested great effort in safeguarding, developing, and innovating its heritage throughout the years. Following the ancient Chinese principle of harmony between heaven and humans, temple masters tend to work on the development of the most natural of body movements in an attempt to achieve the full potential of human expression.

Shaolin has developed activities related to the international promotion of its cultural heritage. In 2012, the first international Shaolin cultural festival was organized in Germany, followed by festivals in the US and England. Official Shaolin cultural centers exist in numerous countries in Europe, the US, Canada, and Russia. Every year, the temple hosts more than thirty international events to promote cultural exchange.

=== International promotion of Shaolin cultural heritage ===
The monastery has organised international cultural exchange activities since the late 20th century, and the temple has been visited by European and American celebrities as well as renowned monks from traditional Buddhist countries such as Myanmar, Thailand, Cambodia, Nepal, and Sri Lanka. Additionally, leaders such as Swedish King Carl XVI Gustaf, British Queen Elizabeth II, Spanish King Juan Carlos I, Australia's former prime minister John Howard, South Africa former president Nelson Mandela, Russian president Vladimir Putin, former US secretary of state Henry Kissinger, and Taiwanese politician James Soong have met with the temple's abbot.

There are more than forty overseas cultural institutions established by the temple's leadership and its disciples in dozens of countries around the world. Shaolin monks come to the centers to teach Buddhist classics, martial arts, meditation, etc. The temple has also organised international Shaolin cultural festivals, the first of which was held in North America.

== Architectural complex of Shaolin Temple ==
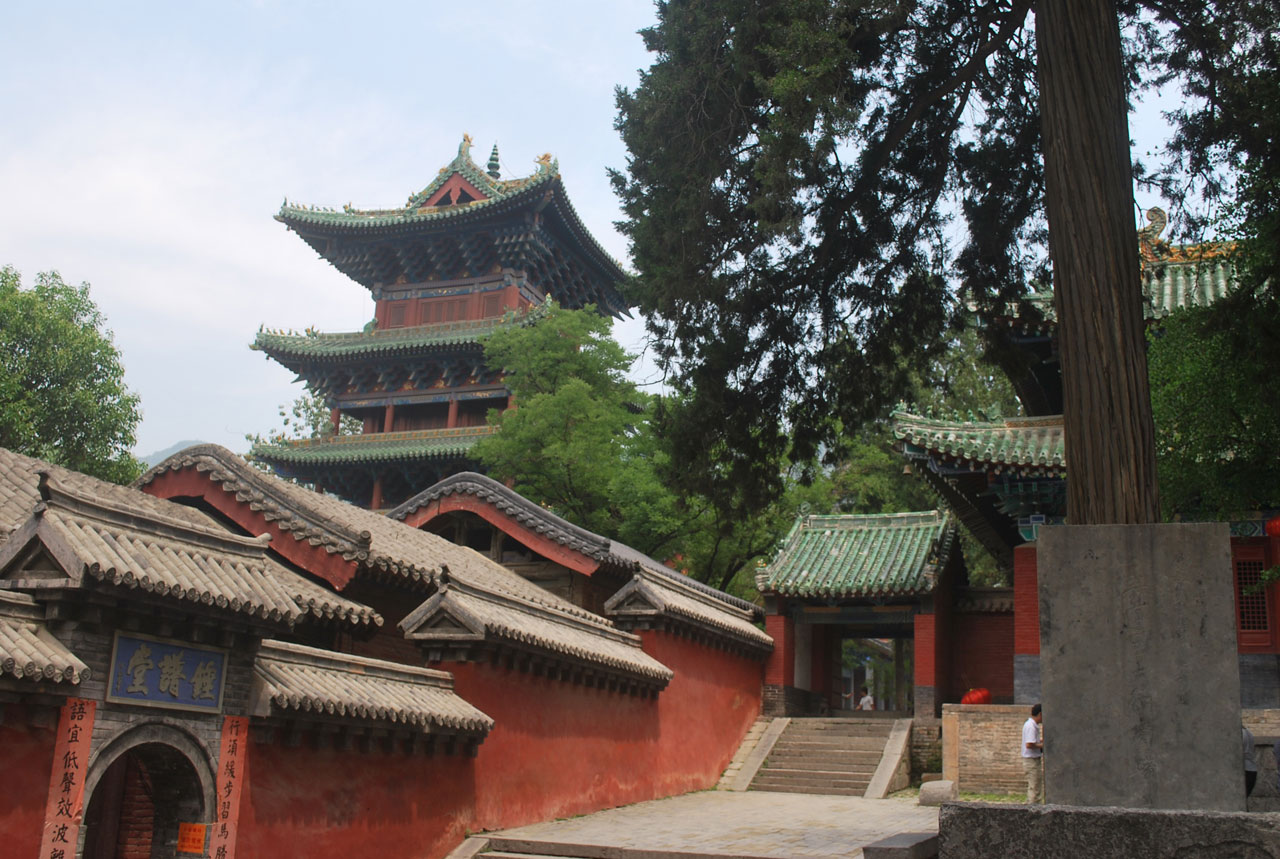
Bell tower at Shaolin Temple grounds

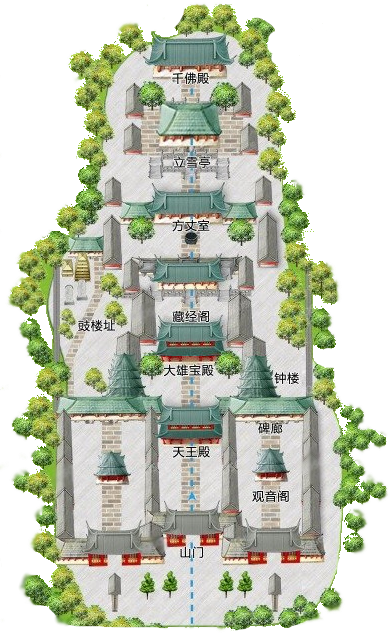
Layout of the Shaolin temple grounds

=== Protection of the site ===
The original Shaolin Temple was burned to the ground in 1928 by Shi Yousan, a nationalist warlord. The monks were either killed or deported. The ground lay more or less abandoned, and under CCP chairman Mao Zedong's Cultural Revolution, it suffered additional damage. However, in 1982, six years after Mao's death in 1976, the Law on the Protection of Cultural Heritage of the People's Republic of China was passed.

The Songshan Scenic Area, established that year, came to include the Shaolin Temple Scenic Spot. "Scenic areas" were created by the 1982 law as protected regions valuable to the public for their natural or cultural assets. The Songshan Scenic Area covers the mountains around Denfeng. In 1990, the Ministry of Construction and Tongji University proposed that scenic areas be divided into subregions called "Scenic Spots". When this measure was passed by the state council (central government), the "Songshan National Scenic Area" (SNSA) acquired the "Shaolin Temple Scenic Spot" (STSS), consisting of the Shaosi side of the Scenic Area. Though named after the monastery in the south of the spot, it also included the north, where the government established a kung fu academy. The scenic spot consists of the entire park.

The government allocated funds for the reconstruction of the monastery as a tourist site. They were to rebuild nine halls, restore ten, and construct eight new ones. However, all documentation on the temple had been destroyed. Already familiar with the type of structure, the architects interviewed elders who had been at the monastery before 1928 for details.

The task became greater than simply restoring the monastery of 1928. That monastery was the end point of a long line of development, which included reconstruction after some twenty or more previous destructions, and variations in size from twenty monks during the Tang dynasty (619–907) to more than 1,800 monks living in 5,000 rooms during the Yuan dynasty (1271–1368). No single configuration representative of the entire span of the monastery was apparent. Multiple possibilities existed, and deliberations about what to restore were complex and prolonged. By 1998, the government of Dengfeng had reconstructed or restored fourteen architectural items, mostly buildings.

By 2010, it was obvious that management decisions were beyond merely the government. A new management was created that year to operate a joint venture between the government, a private company from Hong Kong, and the abbot of a newly constituted body of monks. They were empowered to maintain a balance between historical authenticity and tourist sustainability.

In 2010, several historic sites around Dengfeng were inscribed together as a UNESCO World Heritage Site. The Shaolin Scenic spot contained three of the WHS components, collectively called the "architectural complex". By this, the International Council on Monuments and Sites (ICOMOS) of UNESCO designated three ancient sites: the Shaolin Temple compound, assigned the name "Kernel Compound"; its cemetery, the Pagoda Forest; and its subsidiary, the Chuzu Temple.

=== Access to the site ===
The Shaolin Temple Scenic Spot is located approximately in the middle of Mount Song, an E–W trending massif on the right bank of the Yellow River. The massif is terminated by Luoyang on the west side and Zhengzhou on the east. The straight-line distance from Luoyang to Shaolin is about 50 km (31 mi); from Zhengzhou, about 73 km (45 mi). (Note: As of early 2023, those two types of vehicle as well as bicycles and motorcycles, are the only ways to get to the Scenic Spot. High-speed trains cover most of the distance, but a vehicle ride is required to get from the stations to the North Gate. For a detailed list of the resources as well as pictures of the stations, see "How to Get to & around Dengfeng Shaolin Temple 2023". China Discovery.)

Mount Song is divided by an extensive valley on its south-central side, where much of Dengfeng is located. The mountains around the valley, forming an upside-down U, have been defined as the Songshan Scenic Area. The pass over the U is located directly north of the valley. On the western side is the Shaolin Scenic Spot, accessed by China National Highway 207 (G207), which winds over the pass from the direction of Luoyang and runs past the scenic spot, before descending into the valley and joining other roads leading to Zhengzhou. The north entrance of the scenic spot adjoins G207.

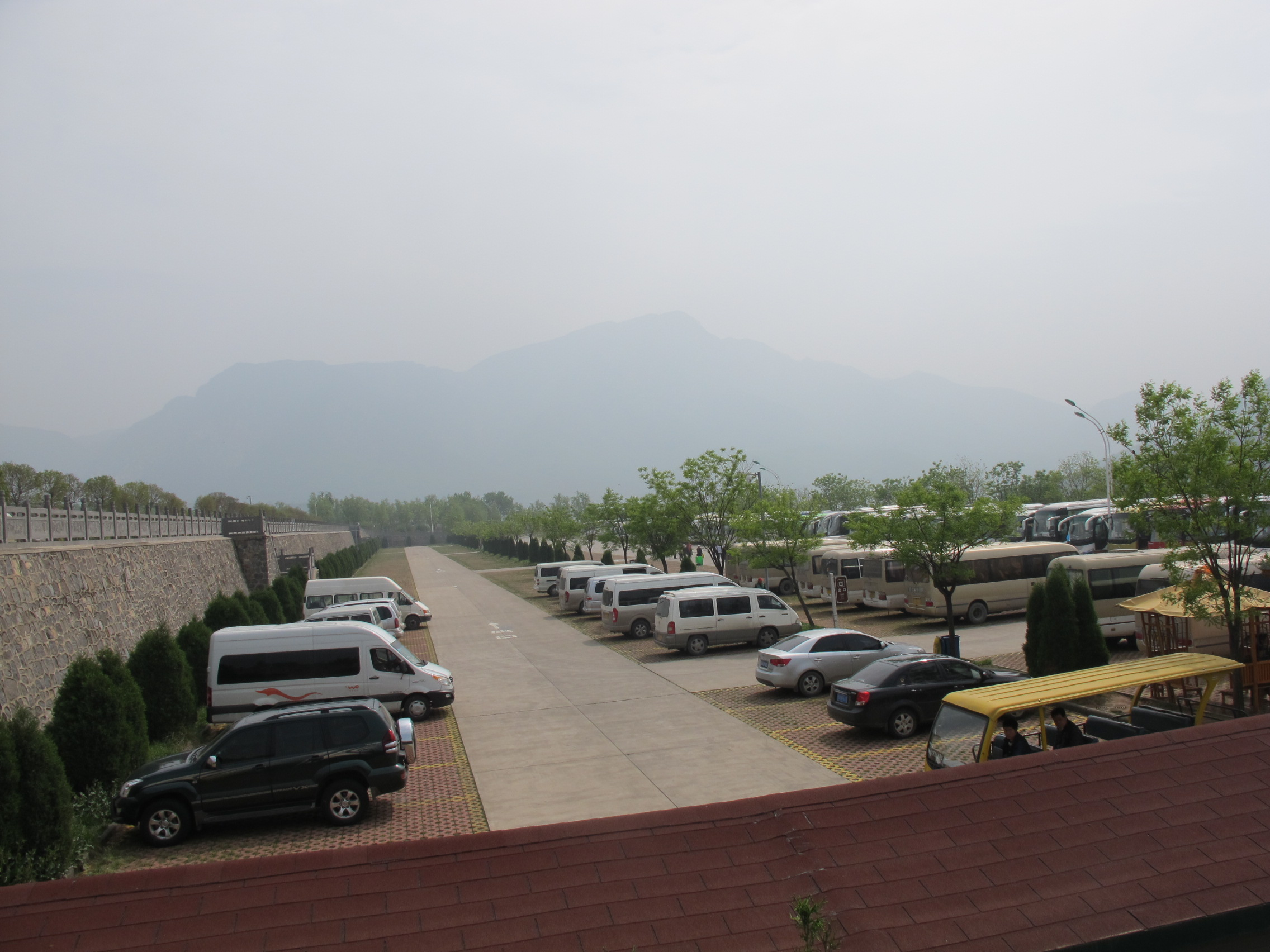
The major public parking area, just south of the bus stop

The North Gate is an entirely new complex built to facilitate the arrival and departure of visitors along the main point of entry, Highway G207. The local highway representing G207 in this case is East Ring Road, Dengfeng. The Shaolin bus stop is at the minimum of the southward-curving highway, at 34°30′59″N 112°56′56″E.

=== Topography ===
The temple's inside area is 160 by 360 meters (520 ft × 1,180 ft), or 57,600 square meters (620,000 sq ft). The buildings are arranged in three lengthwise strips. It has seven main halls on the central axis and seven other halls around, with several yards around the halls. These halls are primarily museums containing Buddhist artifacts. Memorials and monuments are scattered freely around the place, as are ancient ginkgo trees.

The architecture below follows the World Heritage Site (WHS) arrangement.

=== Kernel compound ===
- Shanmen (山门) (built in 1735; the entrance tablet, written in golden characters, reads "Shaolin Temple" (少林寺; shaolinsi) in black background by the Kangxi Emperor of the Qing dynasty in 1704).
- Forest of Steles (碑林; beilin)
- Ciyun tang (慈雲堂; Cíyún táng; "Hall of Compassionate Clouds") (built in 1686; changed in 1735; reconstructed in 1984). It includes the Corridor of Steles (碑廊; beilang), which has 124 stone tablets of various dynasties, from the Northern Qi dynasty (550–570).
- Xilai tang (西来堂; Xīlái táng; "Hall of Western Arrival") a.k.a. Chuipu tang (錘譜堂; Chuípǔ táng; "Hall of Hammer Manuals") (built in 1984)
- Tianwang dian (天王殿; Tiānwáng diàn; "Hall of the Four Heavenly Kings") (built during the Yuan dynasty; repaired during the Ming and Qing dynasties). Statues of the two weapon-wielding guardians are enshrined on both sides of the doorway, while statues of the Four Heavenly Kings are enshrined inside the hall.
- Bell tower (钟楼; zhonglou) (built in 1345; reconstructed in 1994; the bell was built in 1204). The stele displayed in front of the bell tower is the "Emperor's Songyue Shaolin Temple Stele" (皇帝嵩岳少林寺碑; Huángdì sōngyuè shàolínsì bēi), commonly known as "Li Shimin's Stele" (李世民碑; Lǐshìmín bēi). It was carved and erected in the 16th year of the reign of Emperor Xuanzong, during the Tang dynasty (728 AD). The text on the front is a commendation by Emperor Taizong (Li Shimin) of the Shaolin monks for helping the Tang court pacify Wang Shichong. The fifth line from the right has the two characters "shimin" (世民)—Emperor Taizong's personal name—signed by the emperor himself. Another seven characters on the stele read: "imperially inscribed by the cultured august Emperor Taizong"(太宗文皇帝御書, Tàizōng wén huángdì yùshū); they were written by Emperor Xuanzong. The back of the stele is inscribed with a text titled "Imperial Stele Inscription Commemorating the Grant of Baigu Village to Shaolin Monastery" (賜少林寺柏谷莊御書碑記; Cì shàolínsì bǎigǔ zhuāngyùshū bēijì). This text records the account of thirteen staff-wielding monks aiding Emperor Taizong during the fall of the prior Sui dynasty.
- Drum tower (鼓楼; gulou) (built in 1300; reconstructed in 1996)
- Jinnaluo dian (緊那羅殿; Jǐnnàluó diàn; "Hall of the Kinnara") (reconstructed in 1982)
- Liuzu tang (六祖堂; Liùzǔ táng; "Hall of the Sixth Patriarch") – the front of this hall enshrines statues of the bodhisattvas Dashizhi, Guanyin, Wenshu, Puxian, and Dizang. The two sides of the hall enshrine the first six patriarchs of Chan Buddhism: Damo, Huike, Sengcan, Daoxin, Hongren, and Huineng. In addition, a large iron bell cast during the Wanli period of the Ming Dynasty, which weighs about 650 kilograms, is located in the corridor in front of this hall.
- Daxiongbao dian (大雄寶殿; Dàxióngbǎo diàn) a.k.a. Main Hall or Great Hall (built circa 1169; reconstructed in 1985) – this hall enshrines statues of the Three Buddhas of the Three Directions (横三世佛; Héng sānshì fó), namely Shijiamouni, Amituofo, and Yaoshi. It also enshrines statues of Guanyin as well as the Eighteen Arhats. The center of the hall includes a hanging work of calligraphy by the Kangxi Emperor, consisting of four hanzi characters that read "Jeweled trees and fragrant lotuses" (寶樹芳蓮; Bǎoshù fānglián).
- Dining Hall (built during the Tang dynasty; reconstructed in 1995)
- Sutra Room
- Chan tang (禪堂; Chántáng;"Hall of Dhyana") (reconstructed in 1981)
- Guest Reception Hall
- Fatang (法堂; Fǎtáng; "Dharma Hall") a.k.a. Zangjing Ge (藏經閣; Zàngjīng gé; "Pavilion of Buddhist texts") (reconstructed in 1993)
- East & West guest rooms
- Fazhang-shi (方丈室; Fāngzhàng shì; "Abbot's room") (first built during the early Ming dynasty) – this room was used as the temporary lodgings of Emperor Qianlong during his visit to the Shaolin Temple in the 15th year of his reign (1750 AD). It also contains various artifacts, such as mural art, statues of Mi Le and Damo, as well as the lineage chart of the Shaolin tradition.
- Lixue-ting (立雪亭; Lìxuě tíng; "Pavilion of He Who Stands in Snow") a.k.a. Damo-ting (達摩庭; Dámó tíng; "Hall of Damo") (reconstructed in 1983)
- Wenshu dian (文殊殿; Wénshū diàn; "Hall of Wenshu") (reconstructed in 1983)
- Puxian dian (普賢殿; Pǔxián diàn; "Hall of Puxian")
- Baiyi dian (白衣殿; Báiyī diàn; "Hall of the White Robe (Guanyin)") a.k.a. Quanpu dian (拳譜殿; Quánpǔ diàn; "Hall of Boxing Manuals") (built during the Qing dynasty)
- Dizang dian (地藏殿; Dìzàng diàn; "Hall of Dizang") (built during the early Qing dynasty; reconstructed in 1979)
- Qianfo dian (千佛殿; Qiānfó diàn; "Hall of a Thousand Buddhas") a.k.a. Pilu-ge (毗廬閣; Pílú gé; "Pavilion of Piluzhena") (built in 1588; repaired in 1639, 1776) – contains various murals. Among the more notable ones are "Thirteen staff-wielding monks save the Tang king" (十三棍僧救唐王) and "Five hundred arhats and Vairocana" (五百羅漢毘盧圖). The hall also enshrines a bronze statue of Piluzena as well as a white jade statue of Shijiamouni.
- Ordination Platform (built in 2006)
- Monks' rooms
- Shaolin Pharmacy Bureau (built in 1217; reconstructed in 2004).
- Chuzu-an^{[zh]} (初祖庵; Chūzǔ ān; "Hermitage of the First Patriarch") (first built during the Song dynasty)
- Damodong (達摩洞; Dámó dòng; "Cave of Damo") – the cave where Damo, the first patriarch of Chan (Zen) Buddhism, is said to have meditated while facing a wall for nine years.
- Shaolin Temple Wushu Guan (Martial arts hall)

=== Pagoda Forest ===
- Forest of Pagodas Yard (塔林院; talinyuan) (built before 791). It has 240 tomb pagodas of various sizes from the Tang, Song, Jin, Yuan, Ming, and Qing dynasties (618–1911).

== Gallery ==
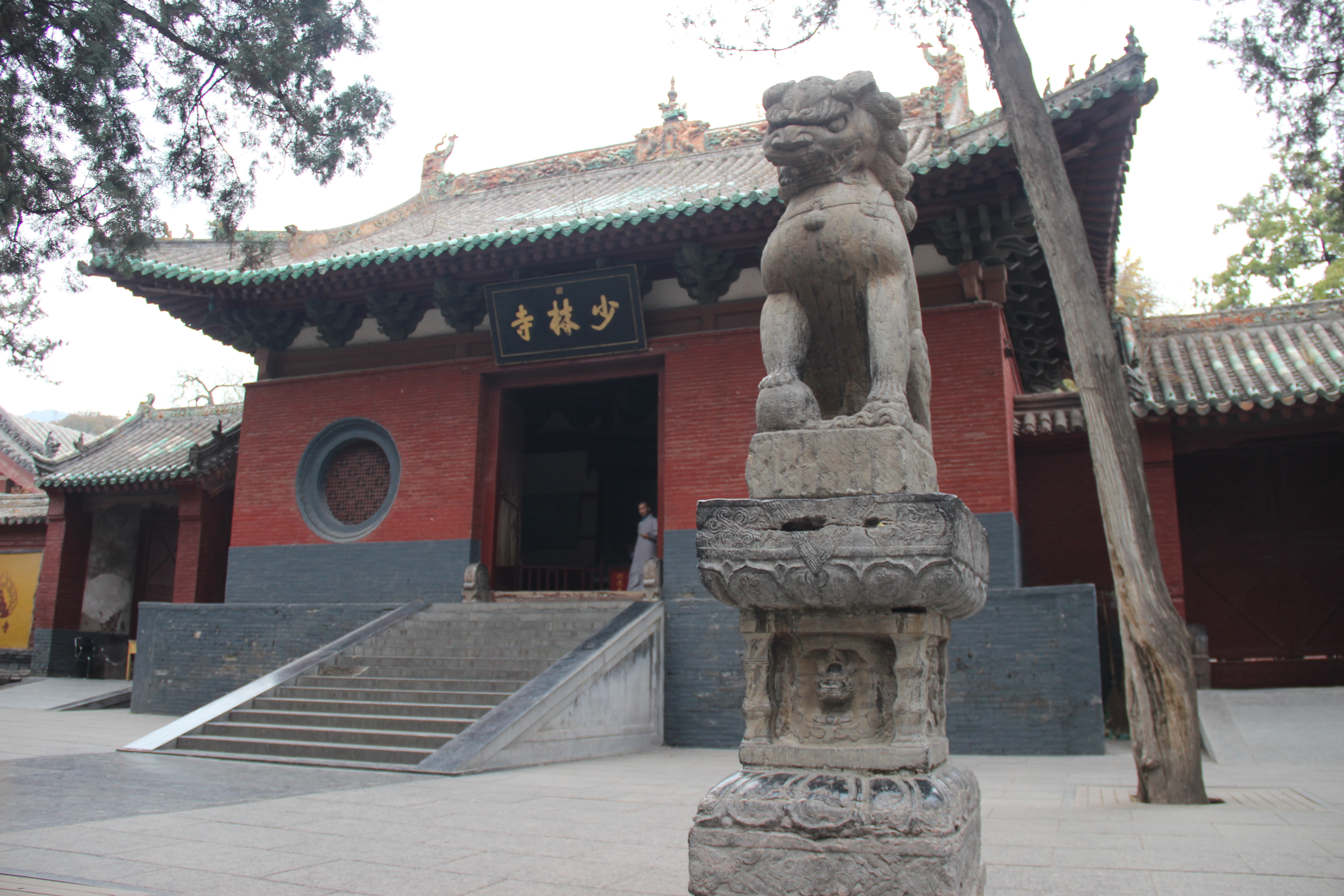
Shaolin temple hall

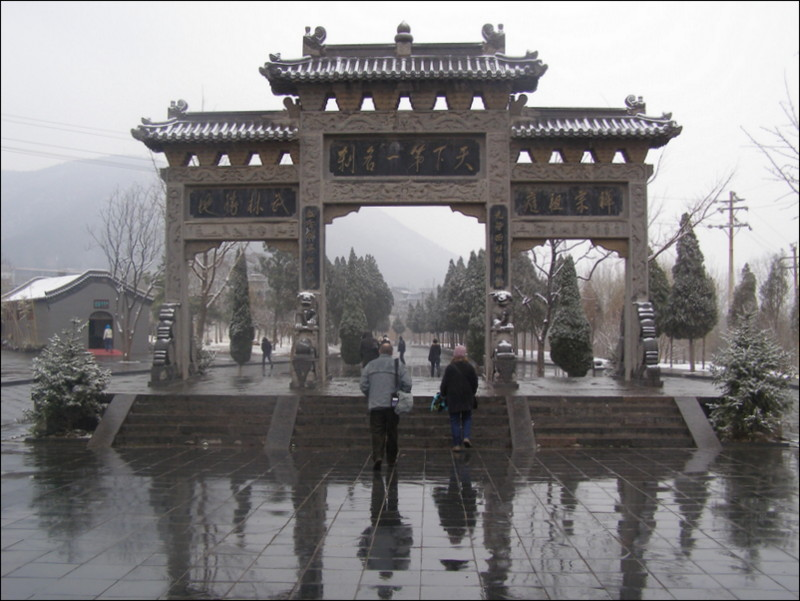
Paifang of the Shaolin Monastery

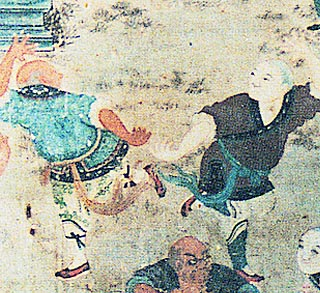
A mural painting in the temple (early 19th century)

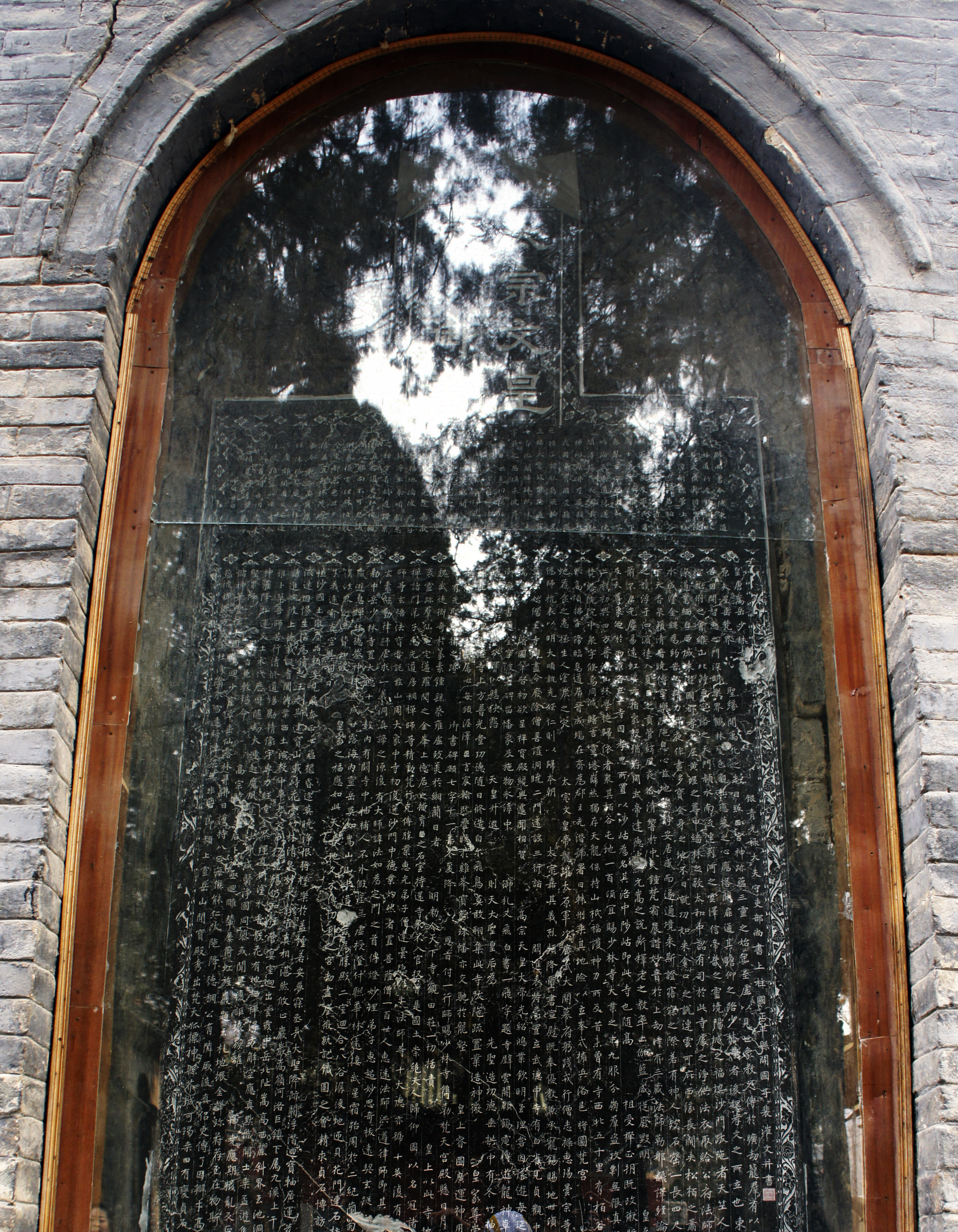
Shaolin Monastery Stele on Mount Song (皇唐嵩岳少林寺碑), erected in AD 728

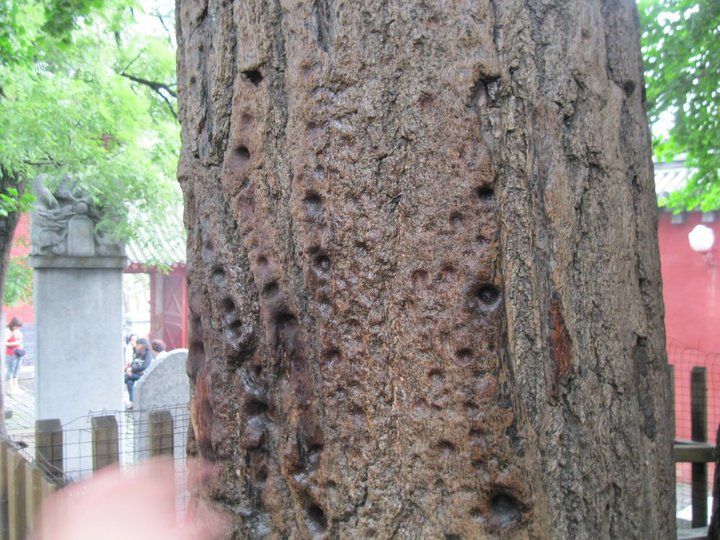
A tree within the Shaolin Monastery used by the monks to practice finger-punching

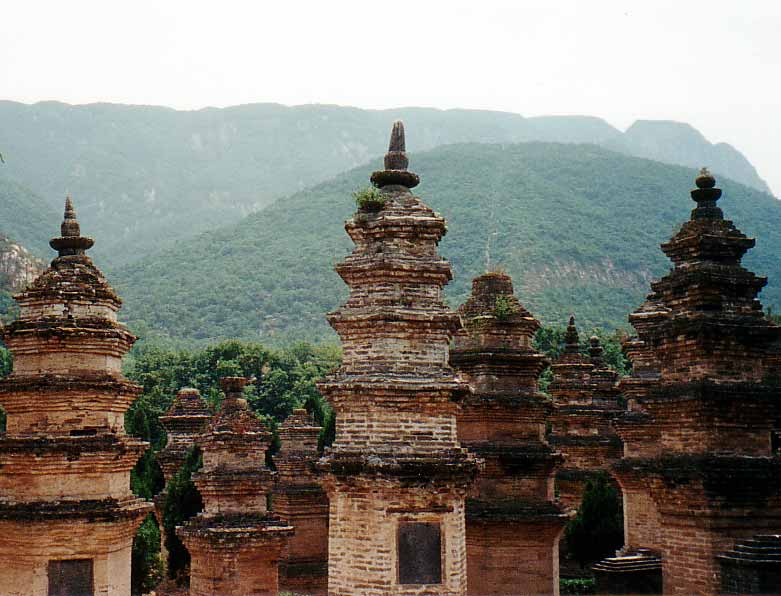
The Pagoda forest (wide view)

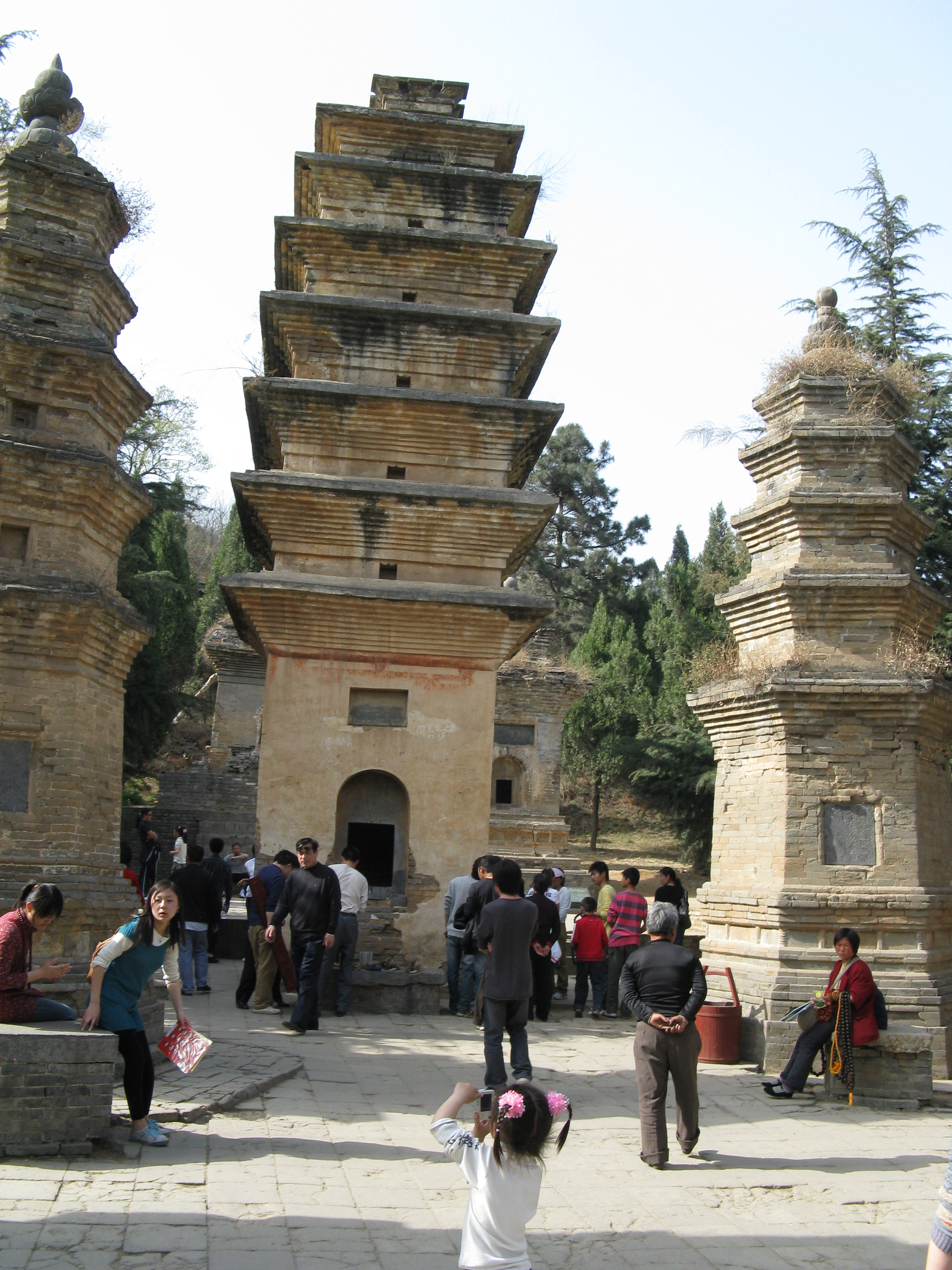
The Pagoda forest (close view), located about 300 meters (980 ft) west of the Shaolin Monastery in Henan

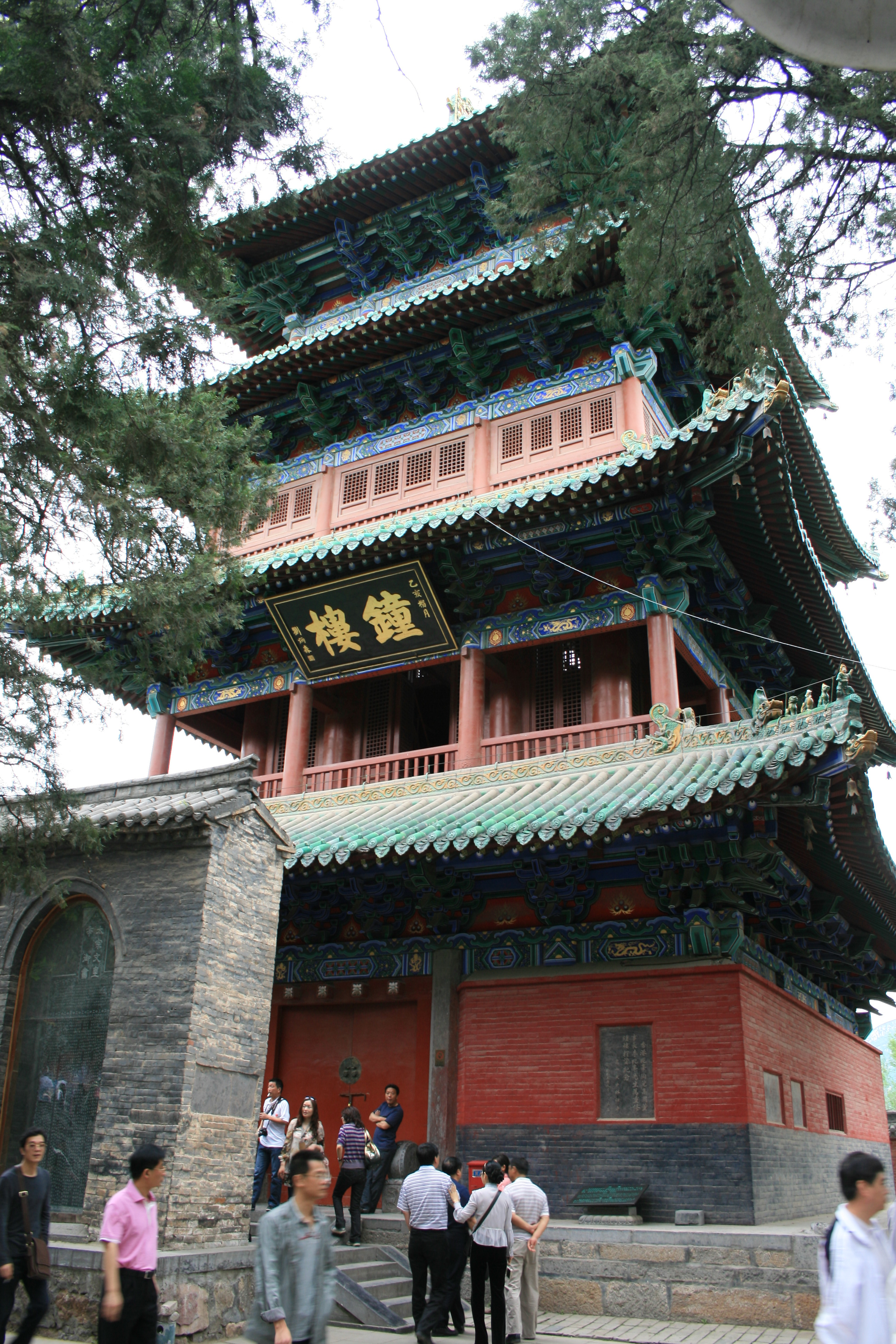
Bell tower

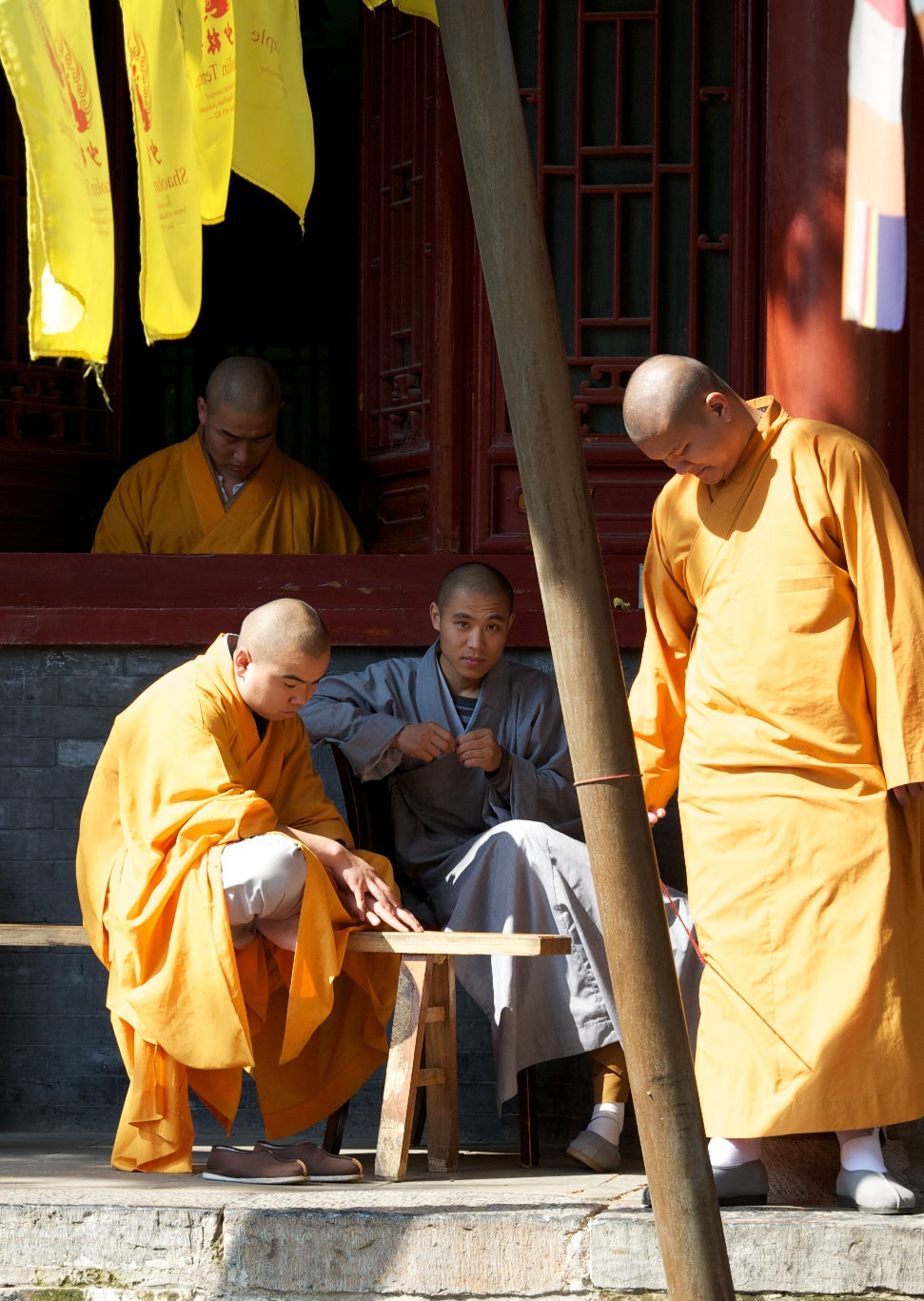
Buddhist monks of Shaolin Monastery

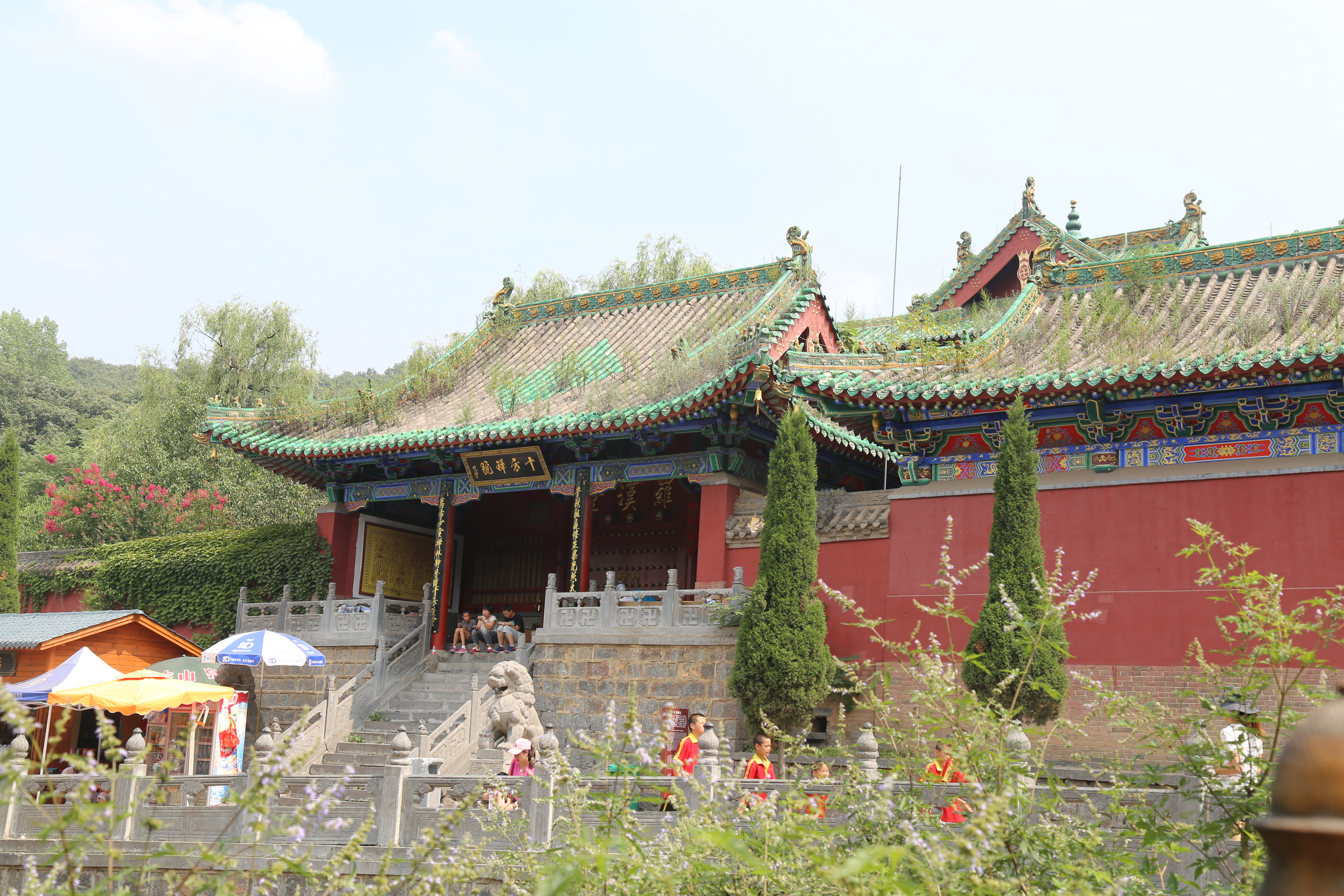

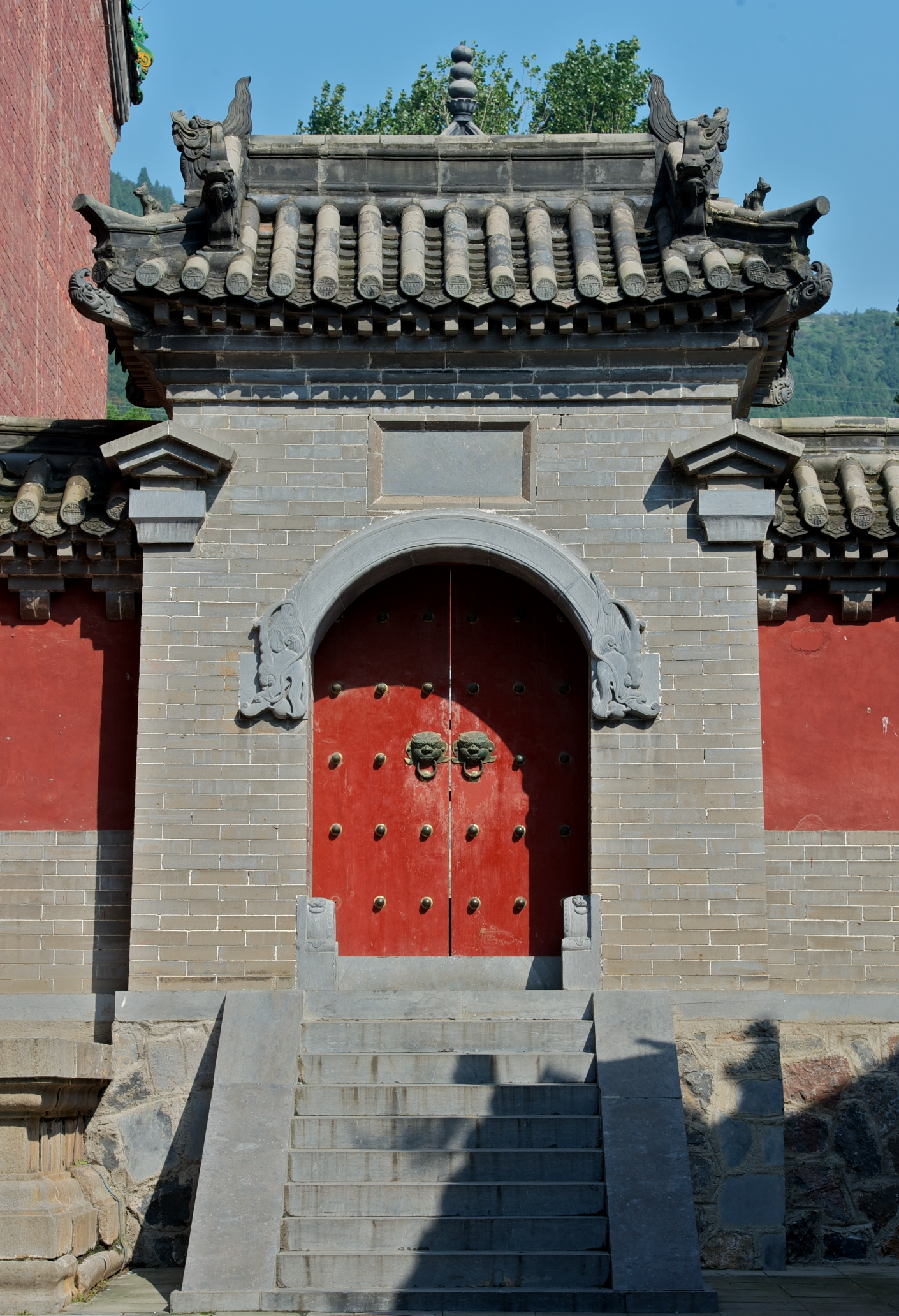
Back door

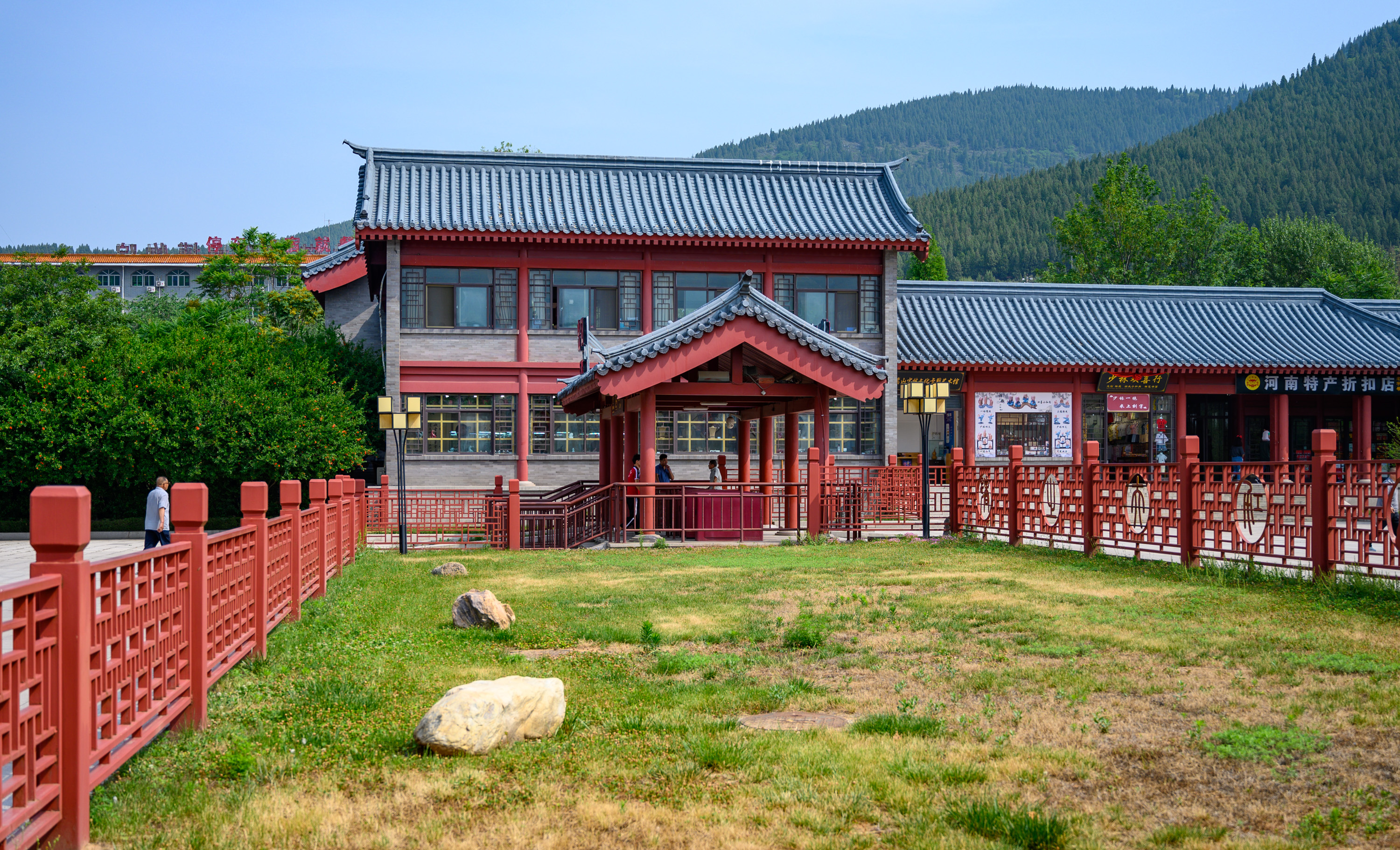
Shaolin Academy

== See also ==
- Shaolin Temple UK
- Bayon – Buddhist temple depicting martial arts bas-relief
- Angkor Wat – Theravada Buddhist temple depicting martial arts bas-relief

== Sources ==
- Henning, Stanley (1994). "The Chinese Martial Arts in Historical Perspective" (PDF). Journal of the Chenstyle Taijiquan Research Association of Hawaii. 2 (3): 1–7.
- Henning, Stan; Green, Tom (2001). "Folklore in the Martial Arts". In Green, Thomas A. (ed.). Martial Arts of the World: An Encyclopedia. Santa Barbara, Calif: ABC-CLIO.
- ICOMOS (2008). Historic Monuments of Denfeng (China) (Report) (No 1305rev ed.). UNESCO World Heritage Centre.
- Khabarovsk, Gofman Oleg Nikolaevich. "Luoyang Road Planner" (in Russian). Translated by Google Translate. The sources for this indexed work are stated by the author to be the area's Guidebooks.
- Lin, Boyuan (1996). Zhōngguó wǔshù shǐ 中國武術史. Taipei: Wǔzhōu chūbǎnshè 五洲出版社.
- Matsuda, Ryuchi (1986). Zhōngguó wǔshù shǐlüè 中國武術史略 (in Chinese). Taipei: Danqing tushu.
- Shahar, Meir (2008). The Shaolin Monastery: history, religion, and the Chinese martial arts. University of Hawaii Press. ISBN 978-0-8248-3110-3.
- Su, Xiaoyan (2015). Reconstructing Tradition: Modernity and Heritage-protected Tourist Destinations in China (PDF) (PhD). The University of Western Australia.
- Su, Xiaoyan; et al. (2019). "The Uses of Reconstructing Heritage in China: Tourism, Heritage Authorization, and Spatial Transformation of the Shaolin Temple". Sustainability. 11 (2): 411. Bibcode:2019Sust...11..411S. doi:10.3390/su11020411.
