= Shi Yongxin =

Chinese Buddhist monk and former Shaolin abbot

Shi Yongxin 释永信
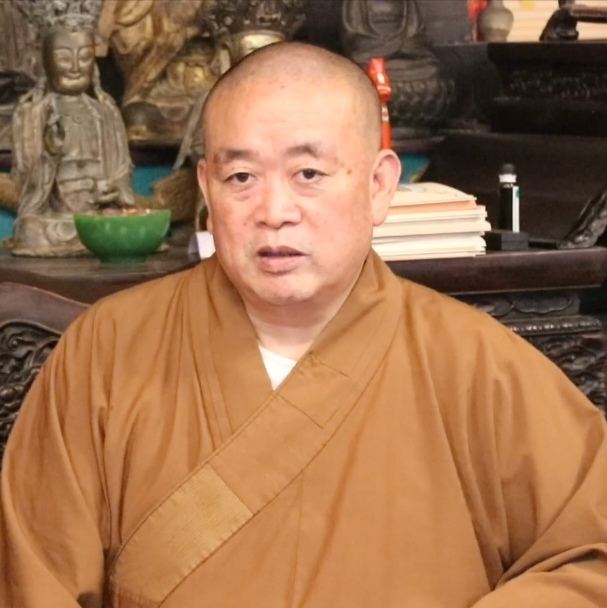
- Shi Yongxin in 2024
- Title: Chan master

Personal life
- Born: Liu Yingcheng (刘应成) Yingshang County, Anhui, China

Religious life
- Religion: Buddhism
- School: Chan Buddhism

Shi Yongxin (simplified Chinese: 释永信; traditional Chinese: 釋永信; pinyin: Shì Yǒngxìn), born Liu Yingcheng (simplified Chinese: 刘应成; traditional Chinese: 劉應成; pinyin: Liú Yìngchéng), is a Chinese Buddhist monk who served as abbot of the Shaolin Temple from 1999 to 2025. He is known for his role in commercializing the temple and for controversies surrounding his personal life.

== Biography ==
Shi was born in Yingshang County, Anhui, China. At the request of his parents, he entered monastic life at the Shaolin Temple at the age of 16 and received full ordination in 1984. At 22, following studies at various Buddhist colleges, he was designated successor to the abbacy of Shaolin Temple. A Dharma assembly was held at the temple from 19 to 20 August 1999, to mark his inauguration as abbot. Shi has served as Chairman of the Henan Province Buddhist Association, Vice-chairman of the Buddhist Association of China, and a delegate to the Ninth through Twelfth sessions of the National People's Congress. His responsibilities were both scholarly and ecclesiastical, including presiding over major ceremonies at the Shaolin Temple.

== Controversies ==
=== Commercialization of the Shaolin Temple ===
Shi has drawn controversy for commercializing the Shaolin Temple and managing it like a business, earning him the nickname "CEO Monk." He has been criticized for accepting lavish gifts, promoting the temple through paid advertisements, and implementing fees for admission and incense burning. Additionally, in 2001, he faced criticism for approving the demolition of the surrounding village to support the temple's bid for UNESCO World Heritage status. In November 2009, the official website of the Shaolin Temple was hacked twice. In the first incident, a calligraphic message reading "Shaolin evildoer Shi Yongxin, go to hell" was posted. In the second, hackers uploaded a letter purportedly written by Shi Yongxin, in which he appeared to apologize for leading a materialistic lifestyle and commercializing the temple. The Shaolin Temple attracts an estimated 3 to 5 million visitors annually, generating over 300 million RMB each year from entrance fees and incense offerings alone. As of 2023, Shi Yongxin controls 18 companies. The temple has registered more than 700 trademarks across categories such as food, lodging, and jewelry. Shaolin cultural centers operate in over 50 countries and regions worldwide, with a global following of more than 3 million international disciples.

Shi has defended his actions by arguing that commercialization is a modern means to promote and preserve traditional Shaolin culture: "Commercialization or industrialization, whatever term you use it, is a path leading up to the truth of Zen. My vision is that Shaolin will eventually become a source of consolidating Chinese people's confidence and wisdom."

=== Criminal allegations ===
In 2011, a rumor alleging that Shi had been arrested for soliciting prostitution circulated widely online. On 8 May of that year, the Shaolin Temple filed a report with local authorities, requesting an investigation into the allegedly defamatory claims.

On 26 July 2015, an anonymous post titled "Shaolin Abbot Shi Yongxin, This Big Tiger—Who Will Supervise?" surfaced online. The author, with the pseudonym "Shi Zhengyi," accused the abbot of holding dual household registrations (hukou) and government identifications, and having been excommunicated twice for theft by previous abbots Xingzheng in 1987 and Dechan in 1988—actions approved by the Buddhist Association of China in 1988—thereby rendering his succession to the abbacy illegitimate. The post also alleged that Shi raped a Buddhist nun, maintained multiple mistresses, and had fathered two daughters: Liu Mengya, with Guan Lili in the early 1990s, and Han Jia'en (b. 2009), with a nun named Shi Yanjie (born Han Mingjun). The Shaolin Temple denied the allegations the following day. On 30 July, a joint statement of 29 Shaolin monks alleged that the anonymous poster "Shi Zhengyi" was Shi Yanlu, the former head of the temple's martial monks. While Shi Yanlu denied being the author of the online post, he publicly supported its contents. Shi Yongxin was scheduled to lead a delegation to Thailand on 2 August, but his trip was canceled due to an ongoing investigation launched by the Dengfeng Religious Affairs Bureau. On 8 August, Shi Yanlu and five associates formally submitted a written report to the National Religious Affairs Administration, largely reiterating the online allegations. The case was subsequently referred to the Henan Religious Affairs Bureau, which concluded in November 2015 that the accusations were unfounded.

On 27 July 2025, the Shaolin Temple announced that Shi Yongxin was under investigation for alleged criminal misconduct, including the embezzlement and misappropriation of temple funds and assets. He was also accused of serious violations of Buddhist monastic discipline, including maintaining improper relationships with multiple women and fathering illegitimate children. The following day, the Buddhist Association of China announced the revocation of his monastic credentials upon recommendation of the Henan Provincial Buddhist Association. On 29 July, Shi Yinle was transferred from his post as abbot of the White Horse Temple to replace Shi Yongxin at the Shaolin Temple.

On 16 November 2025, the Xinxiang people's procuratorate had approved an arrest warrant for Shi.

On 29 May 2026, the Xinxiang People's Court sentenced Shi to 24 years and fined 3.5 million yuan for multiple crimes, including embezzlement and bribery.
