= Shaolin Monastery Stele =

Chinese stele erected in 728 commemorating Shaolin support for the Tang dynasty

Shaolin Monastery Stele Stele of Emperor Taizong Li Shimin Stele
- Chinese: 皇唐嵩岳少林寺碑
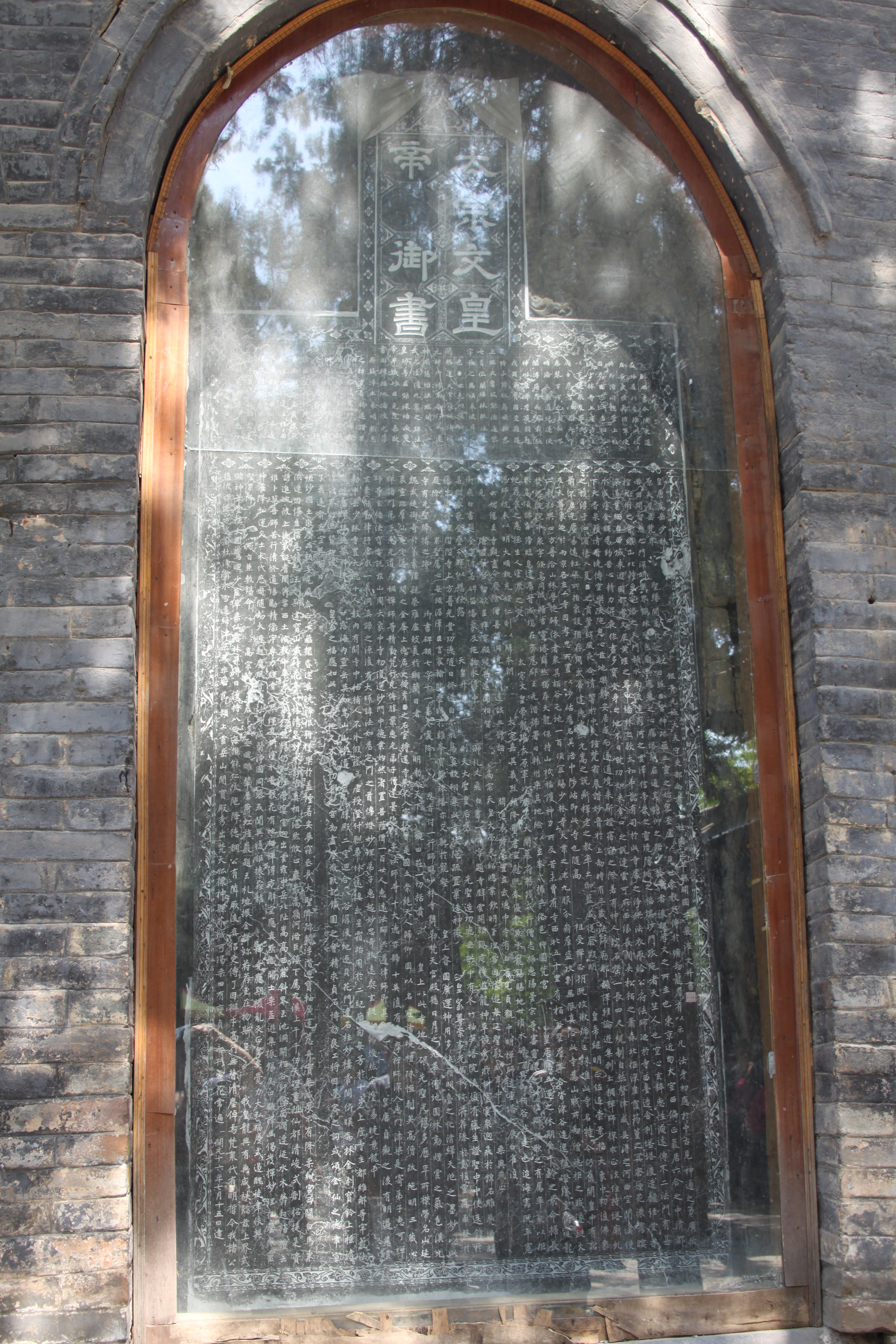
- Above: Front surface of the Shaolin Monastery stele Below: The half of the brick structure containing the Shaolin Monastery stele visible before the Bell Tower

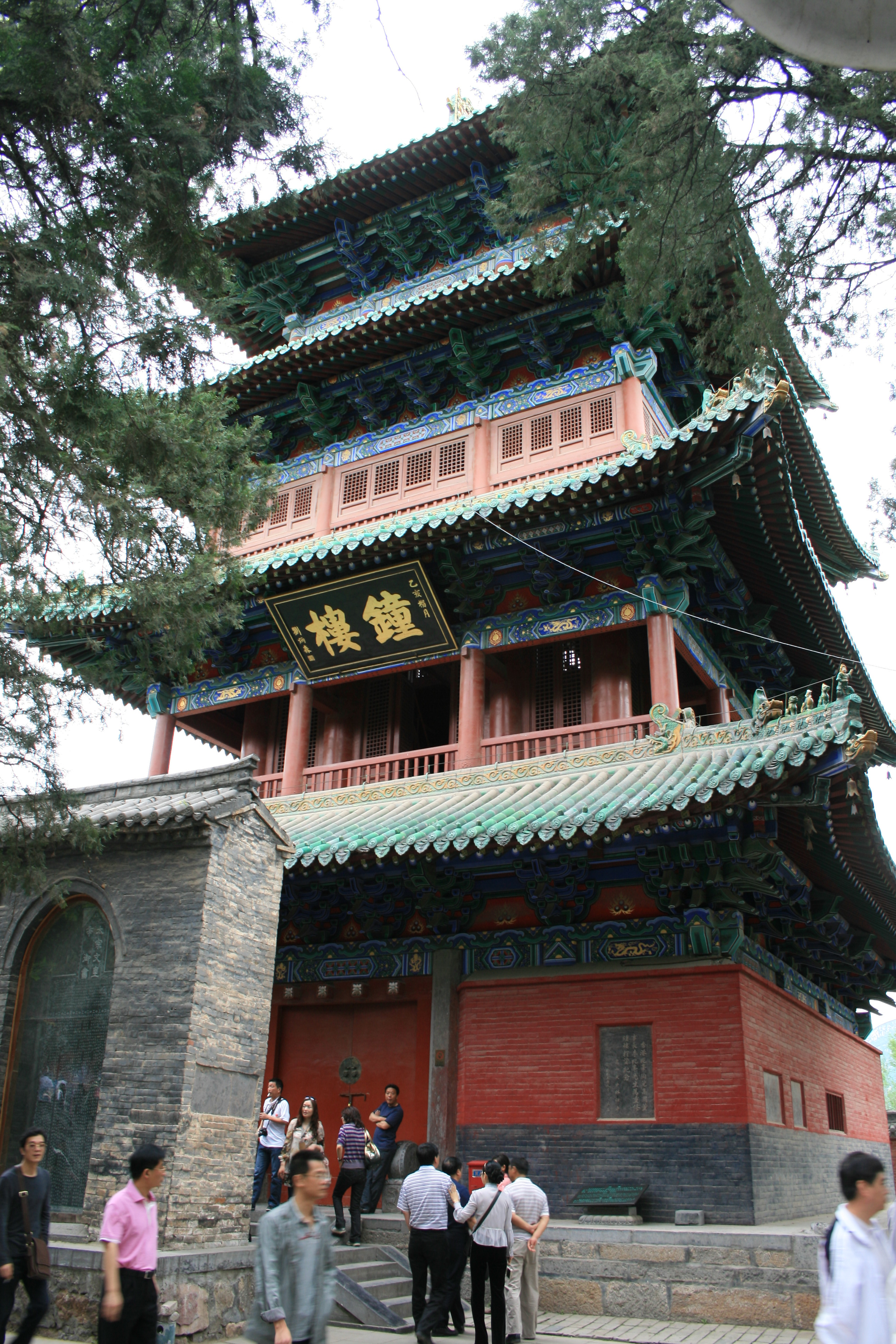
- Type: Imperial proclamation
- Material: Inscribed stone supported by brick structure
- Length: 38.18 cm (15.03 in)
- Height: 4 m (13 ft) (Note: The dimensions vary slightly on the Internet for a number of reasons: the sources are rarely reporting measurements of the stele, but are using photographs; the dimensions of the tablet are concealed by the brick structure; the figures are only intended to be rough estimates.)
- Width: 136 cm (4.46 ft)
- Writing: Chinese
- Created: 728
- Discovered: 1513; Shaolin Monastery; 34°30′28″N 112°56′08″E
- Discovered by: Du Mu
- Present location: Remains approximately in place. (Note: Verellen reports that in his time the stele had been removed from in front of the Bell Tower and encased in "a brick wall." Considering the time period, the Bell Tower must then have been under reconstruction, perhaps also the brick structure, as in the final configuration the position of the structure matches the pre-1928 stele positions fairly closely. He is correct in their not having been left in situ.)
- Culture: Beginning of the Tang dynasty

The Shaolin Monastery Stele (Shaolin Si Bei; Chinese: 皇唐嵩岳少林寺碑) is a tablet inscribed front and back to obtain two faces of continuous text in Chinese characters. The total engravable surface is about 10 m^{2} (110 sq ft). The name was in use by later scholars studying the Tang dynasty (618–907), who understood the tablet to be an important primary source on early Tang dynasty events. It is being presented by many writers of the current times as the first source indicating that the professedly pacific monks did in fact participate in dynastic wars.

The issue was a disputed succession among the reigning House of Li. The father, Li Yuan, the first Tang emperor, who had taken the regnum away from the previous rulers, the Sui dynasty (581-618), now favored his second son, Li Shimin, on the basis of his close support, which earned him the later identification as co-founder of the dynasty. Li Shimin's brothers, who had been keeping the "barbarians" at bay on the frontier, raised the standard of civil war. Li Shimin triumphed, becoming the second Tang regnant, Taizong.

The monks of Shaolin had volunteered some assistance, first to the father, then to the son, in keeping the Mount Song territory. There is no evidence that they had any special martial arts skills. Nevertheless, their being selected subsequently as a unit of the imperial army suggests they had more military merit than an offer of moral support. Later they are known to have excelled in two main martial arts: primarily the staff (English quarter-staff), and its non-staff adjunct, hand-to-hand fighting (kung fu). The substitution of "sword" for "staff" in some texts suggests staffmanship may have spilled over into its more dangerous partner, swordsmanship.

Nearly a century later, during the Tang "golden age," Emperor Xuanzong of Tang, Li Longji (regnit 712–756), deciding for reasons of his own to publicly clarify and commemorate the status of the monastery with regard to the empire, entrusted the matter to his Minister of Personnel, Pei Cui, who had the stele erected as a public declaration not unlike the publication of Greek law in stone in the marketplace. The original design and composition of the text were his work. On 15 July 728, a festival day, Pei Cui ordered the text published on one stele in front of Bell Tower. (Note: The names of most of the buildings at Shaolin were of a standard type, so that the same name might appear at multiple locations. This Bell tower is not to be confused with the one in Beijing.) It survived intact except for wear, tear, and cracks, through all the centuries of the monastery's trials and troubles, even the last one, Mao Zedong's Cultural Revolution.

When the Bell Tower came to be rebuilt, a number of steles were in front of it. They were scarcely legible except by special study. To protect two of them the restorers built a brick structure around them in which they appear tandem in two archways. (Note: A photograph made before 1928 of the two steles in front of the Bell Tower can be found at "The Songshan Shaolin Temple". Kungfu Zoetermeer. under "Taizong Wenhuangdi Yushubei:Three Religions and Nine Schools." The next photograph shows the same two steles in the same relative positions enclosed together in a brick structure.) Special cases were placed over the inscriptions with the letters appearing color-enhanced within them. The larger stele, on the right of the front face, is the topic of this article. The smaller, on the left, is generally ignored. (Note: The contributor of the picture on flickr, Gary Lee Todd, terms it a "Shaolin Temple Ancient Stele." The other one is "Tang Dynasty 'Li Shimin Stele.'") Media generally try to take pictures only of the right half. Sometimes the left half is mistaken for the reverse of the stele of interest. Since there is only one Shaolin Monastery stele, (Note: As it turns out, Shaolinsi Bei is not a unique use to mean this stele and no other. After mentioning the work of Mamoru (first name) Tonami (last name) on this Shaolinsi Bei, Wong goes on to describe another Shaolinsi Bei, dated 570-571, which was totally destroyed in 1928, but is known by a photograph of the obverse and a rubbing of the reverse.) that case is impossible. Not usually shown is the reverse of the structure, displaying the inscriptions on the reverse sides of the tablets. The inscription of present interest would then be on the viewer's left.

== Inscriptions ==
Since 1928 and until the late reconstruction of the monastery and opening as a tourist center, opportunities to study the inscriptional content of the stele have been rare, due first to the political situation and second to the reconstruction. Rubbings and reports have been available. Two major analysts have emerged. Manoru Tonami studied the rubbings and published in Japanese, to be translated by P.A. Herbert. Meir Shahar had the advantage of being able to study the stele embedded in the brick structure before the Bell Tower. He published in the first decade of the 21st century. Some of his works are cited below.

Pei Cui's composition of the inscriptional material presents in English something of a semantic problem. Ordinarily the engraving of writing on one object for one purpose, without later additions, is termed "an inscription" or "the inscription." Strictly speaking, since everything on Shaolinsi Bei was done at one time for the same purpose, it is one inscription. Many examples of multi-page single inscriptions exist, such as the Gortyn Law Code.

Pei Cui, however, chose to publish a number of different documents composed at different times, to be enclosed with his own history of the monastery. Tonami approached this problem as follows: "...its four principal inscriptions reproduce several documents from the 720's ...," which was promptly misconstrued as four inscriptions on Internet summaries. "Principal" was condensed away, but if it were left in, the implication is that multiple inscriptions existed on possibly multiple steles. The exact number apparently had still not been determined. Verellen, Tonami's reviewer, says: "The final inscription ... is again a composite document." Now apparently the stele recorded documents within four inscriptions that contained multiple inscriptions. Some way needed to be found to describe Pei Cui's composition with simplicity and accuracy.

Chinese steles customarily incorporated previously existing documents in just this way. Shahar's solution to the semantic problem begins with the "document," a previously composed piece published first in some other medium. Engraved later on a stele, it is a "text." Texts are inscriptions, one for one. Shaolinsi Bei has seven texts, or seven inscriptions, dating from 621 to 728. They were public records of the military support the Shaolin Monastery had provided Li Shimin. They demonstrate that the monastery was in favor with the early Tang emperors at a time when other religious organisations were being curtailed. This favor derived from their participation in battles, whether or not they had the skills attributed to "the fighting monks."

The arrangement of the sections below is based on Shahar's arrangement of the "texts." The whole space consists of two surfaces shaped like arched doorways. At the top of the arch, both front and back, is a rectangle called by Verellen a "dragon Apex" because framed with the coils of a dragon in relief. On the front side this is distinct space with a separate inscription identifying Taizong. Its characters are larger and run in four rows of two characters each. Then follows Pei Cui's history covering the entire front face.

In the dragon apex of the reverse is the letter signed with the characteristic calligraphy of Li Shimin. Below it the remaining five documents occupy the remaining reverse space. The sections below contain brief descriptions of the seven documents. (Note: Although Shahar's arrangement has been adopted as the best one, the sections are not based on Shahar except as noted.)

=== History of the Shaolin Monastery ===
==== Testimony of Pei Cui ====
The scholars of the tablets have taken a primarily historical approach, and there is no substitute for objective history, wherever it can be found. Shahar starts his study with "the last years of the Daye ... reign period (605–616)." That is not, however, where Pei Cui begins.

Going as far back as the foundation of the monastery, Pei Cui records simply that Emperor Xiaowen of Northern Wei (Note: x is pronounced sh.) (467-499, died at 32) founded it. The Northern Wei, including Xiaowen and his family, were ethnic Xianbei. These were speakers of the Tuoba language, a now extinct branch of the Mongolic languages spoken by the Tuoba people of North China.

North China is separated climatologically from South China by the divide between the Yellow River and the Yangtze River, both of which flow from the mountains of Central Asia eastward into the China Seas. Archaeology along the Yellow River suggests that the valley of the eastern, or lower, Yellow River is the Neolithic cradle of the civilization today called "Chinese" by westerners. (Note: More information on the standard geography of China is given in North China Plain, or the standard encyclopedias, such as "North China Plain". Britannica.) Today's China is the territory of 55 ethnic groups, which fall under the aegis of "Chinese." These groups were politically conglomerated around a single Neolithic ethnic group passing into history with an endonym of Hanren, "Han Chinese," today the most populous ethnic group (1.4 billion) in the world.

The testimony of the stele thus offers some counter-intuitive results. One might expect that the founder of an institution considered characteristically Chinese, located in the spiritual heart of China, to have been a Chinese emperor of the most civilized period. Instead the stele relates that he was what the Hanren called "a barbarian." Moreover, the state in which he founded it was not then Hanren. Chan Buddhism was just beginning, but it came from far-away India. There was nothing "Chinese" about it.

=== Text 7: Thirteen heroic monks ===
Text 7 is a list of thirteen heroic monks. It's likely that the list was compiled close to the time the stele was erected, or even added at a later date, and may therefore be influenced as much by folklore that had grown up in the years since the Cypress Valley victory in 632.

Cited by Emperor Taizong of Tang for meritorious service are:

- Dean, monk Shanhu
- Abbot, monk Zhicao
- Overseer, monk Huiyang
- General-in-chief, monk Tanzong
- Monk Puhui
- Monk Mingsong
- Monk Lingxian
- Monk Pusheng
- Monk Zhishou
- Monk Daoguaung
- Monk Zhixing
- Monk Man
- Monk Feng

== See also ==
- Shaolin Monastery

== Reference bibliography ==
- Khabarovsk, Gofman Oleg Nikolaevich. "Luoyang Road Planner" (in Russian). Translated by Google Translate. The sources for this indexed work are stated by the author to be the area's Guidebooks.
- Shahar, Meir (2000). "Epigraphy, Buddhist Historiography, and Fighting Monks: The Case of the Shaolin Monastery" (PDF). Asia Major. 13 (2): 15–36.
- Shahar, Meir (2001). "Ming-Period Evidence of Shaolin Martial Practice" (PDF). Harvard Journal of Asiatic Studies. 61 (2): 359–413. doi:10.2307/3558572. JSTOR 3558572.
- Shahar, Meir (2008). The Shaolin Monastery: History, Religion, and the Chinese Martial Arts. Honolulu: University of Hawaii Press. ISBN 978-0-8248-3110-3.
- Verellen, Franciscus (1993). "Tónami Mamoru: The Shaolin Monastery Stele on Mount Song [compte-rendu]". Bulletin de l'École française d'Extrême-Orient Année. 80 (80): 326–328.
- Wong, Dorothy C. (2004). Chinese Steles. Honolulu: University of Hawaii Press.
