= Shi Yinle =

Chinese Buddhist monk and Current Shaolin abbot

Shi Yinle 释印乐
- Title: Abbott

Personal life
- Born: Yin Qingquan (尹清全); 1966 (age 59–60) Tongbai, Henan, China

Religious life
- Religion: Buddhism
- School: Han Buddhism

Shi Yinle (simplified Chinese: 释印乐; traditional Chinese: 釋印樂; pinyin: Shì Yìnlè), born Yin Qingquan (Chinese: 尹清全; pinyin: Yǐn Qīngquán), is a Chinese Buddhist monk who has served as abbot of the Shaolin Temple since 2025. He is known for his role as the former abbot of the White Horse Temple.

== Biography ==
Venerable Shi Yinle was born in southern Henan's Tongbai county in 1966 and was ordained at the Tongbai Mountain Temple at the age of 16. In 1986, after training at the Qixia Temple in eastern China, he went on to study at the Chinese Buddhist Academy. Shi Yinle then joined the Henan Provincial Buddhist Association, eventually assuming the position of deputy secretary-general, as well as becoming vice-secretary of the Chinese Buddhist Association and a deputy to the National People's Congress. In 2003, the Henan association appointed him to serve at the historic site of the White Horse Temple, know by scholars as the oldest Buddhist temple in China, where he was promoted to abbot two years later.

== Monastery Reforms ==
Shi Yinle's belief that the monks at the temple have strayed away from focusing on a spiritual path and as he has stated "We're now neither properly practicing or properly working!" Due to this ideology he immediately introduced a rigorous "Buddhist 996 schedule", named after China's intense tech industry work hours, and announced sweeping reforms within the monastery and to monastic life, encouraging self-sufficiency through the production of food and farming, bringing a halt to commercial performances including the banning of high-priced consecration public rituals, and removing temple shops and merchandise. All of these initiatives, and activities that were in the past that were for purely generating financial revenue, are now being replaced with free initiatives and access to educational resources including temple life restoring the focus on spiritual, ethical, moral and cultural practice.
