= Fayun Faxiu =

Fayun Faxiu 法雲法秀
- Title: Chan master

Personal life
- Born: 1027
- Died: 1090 (aged 62–63)

Religious life
- Religion: Buddhism
- School: Yunmen/Unmon

Senior posting
- Teacher: Tianyi Yihuai
- Predecessor: Tianyi Yihuai
- Students: Changlu Zongze

Fayun Faxiu (Chinese: 法雲法秀) or Fayun Yuantong (Chinese: 法雲圓通 Japanese: Hōun Entsū) was a Chan Buddhist monk of Song Dynasty China. A follower of the Yunmen School, Faxiu had many friends among the educated elite, including scholars, writers, and painters, such as Huang Tingjian, Su Shi, Wang Shen, Wang Anshi, and Li Gonglin. He is also remembered for a quotation recorded by his student Changlu Zongze in the Chanyuan Qinggui, or The Rules of Purity in the Chan Monastery. In that influential text, he is quoted as saying that practitioners who meditate with closed eyes are in the "ghostly cave under the dark mountain". Dahong Baoen, a student of Touzi Yiqing, is said to have practiced with Faxiu, who recognized his promise in Zen practice.

Faxiu was a close friend of the Song Dynasty painter Li Gonglin, who depicted him in a painting called "Elegant Gathering in the Western Garden". As an apparently moralistic teacher, Faxiu taught his lay students in terms of karmic retribution, and he specifically urged Gonglin to give up painting horses lest he be reborn as one. Faxiu suggested he should instead repent by painting the Bodhisattva of compassion, Guanyin (Avalokiteśvara). He also was in contact with Huang Tingjian, whose writing he criticized for its "seductive language". Juefan Huihong, a contemporary monk, recorded that Faxiu had a famously bad temper. He wrote of Faxiu:

...he had a severe, cold expression. [His imposing] rage [gives the impression that] he would spit [water] at people. In his life he regarded cursing as the business of Buddhism.

In 1084, Faxiu was appointed to be the first abbot of Fayun Chan Monastery by Emperor Shenzong of Song, which is the origin of the "Fayun" in his name. The Great Hall there was furnished with the help of his friends, with Su Shi providing the inscription for the great bell, and Li Gonglin sculpting the main Buddha image.

The Conglin shengshi, or Glorious matters from the monasteries, written in 1199 by Guyue Daorong, presents a supposed dialogue between Faxiu and his teacher Tianyi Yihuai. In it, Yihuai asks Faxiu what the essence of the Avatamsaka Sutra is, to which Faxiu replies "dharmadhatu". Yihuai then asks what the essence of dharmadhatu is. Faxiu responds "Mind". Unrelenting, Yihuai asks what the essence of Mind is, to which Faxiu finds himself unable to respond. Faxiu later traveled to the Longmian Mountains to practice with Fushan Fayuan.
