= Yiduan =

Yīduàn
- Title: Ch'an master

Personal life
- Born: China

Religious life
- Religion: Buddhism
- School: Ch'an

Yīduàn (義端) was a 12th-century Chinese monk of the Chan (禪) school of Buddhism.

Yiduan is notable for the saying "Language is a sham, silence a lie, but beyond language and silence a road goes by" (語是謗, 寂是誑, 語寂向上有路在).
