= Changlu Zongze =

Chinese Chan Buddhist monk and author

Changlu Zongze 長蘆宗賾
- Title: Chan master
- Died: 1107

Religious life
- Religion: Buddhism
- School: Yunmen/Unmon

Senior posting
- Teacher: Changlu Yingfu; Fayun Faxiu
- Predecessor: Changlu Yingfu

Changlu Zongze (Chinese: 長蘆宗賾; pinyin: Chánglú Zōngzé Japanese: Chōro Shūjaku; Korean: 장노종? Changno Chong?; Vietnamese: Trường Lư Tông Trách) (died c. 1107) was a Chinese Chan Buddhist monk noted for writing the Chanyuan Qinggui, or The Rules of Purity in the Chan Monastery. Written in 1103, it was the earliest comprehensive book of monastic rules for Chan Buddhist monasteries. The short essay Zuochan yi, also attributed to Zongze, is the earliest guide to seated meditation in the Chan tradition.

Little is known about him, but the influence of his work was significant and he is exalted in the Pure Land documents as one of the patriarchs of the Pure Land lineage. He was raised by his mother, having lost his father (whose surname was Sun) at an early age. After studying Confucius at an early age he turned to Buddhism. He was ordained at the age of 29 by Fayun Faxiu, but later studied with Changlu Yingfu. Years later, he experienced a sudden awakening which he recorded in a poem, after which he was declared a Cijue Dashi (Master of Compassion and Enlightenment).
