= Zuochan Yi =

The Zuochan Yi or Principles of Zazen (Chinese: 坐禅儀), is a short Chan Buddhist meditation manual attributed to a monk named Changlu Zongze (flourished c. turn of the 12th century) during the Northern Song dynasty (CE 960 - 1126) which exemplifies the practice of seated meditation which aims at "sudden" enlightenment. According to Peter Gregory it is the "earliest known work of its kind in the Zen tradition." The Zuochan Yi was later revised and expanded in 1202 by You Xiang and this version was published together with Changlu Zongze's monastic code Chanyuan Qinggui "Pure Regulations of the Chan Preserve", the earliest extant Chan monastic code, which was widely circulated.

== Outline ==
In writing the Principles, Zongze was influenced by the works of the Tiantai meditation master Zhiyi as well as by the Cultivation and Realization According to the Sutra of Perfect Enlightenment by Guifeng Zongmi (780-841). The Principles actually quotes large parts of Zhiyi's introduction to meditation, the Xiao Zhi Guan, showing the extent of the Tiantai influence on Chinese Chan. The 600-700 character text begins with a description of the traditional cross-legged meditation posture with eyes partially opened (criticizing Zhiyi for promoted closed eyes) and then outlines how the meditator is to watch his thoughts until his mind becomes unified: "Do not think of any good or evil whatsoever. Whenever a thought occurs, be aware of it; as soon as you are aware of it, it will vanish. If you remain for a long period forgetful of objects, you will naturally become unified."

Unlike the meditation works of Zhiyi, the 'Principles' doesn't outline a vipassana practice which leads to wisdom - prajña. This might be because the ideas of Zongze seem to be related practices in the Chan chronicle Lengqie Shizi ji and to the teachings of the East Mountain Teaching, who taught that in quieting the mind one would be able to see one's innate Buddha nature and that this was a form of sudden enlightenment. This teaching is also related to the concept of tathātā "Suchness" which is derived from the Awakening of Faith in the Mahayana. Zongze uses a well known metaphor to describe how practicing his kind of samadhi will lead the discovery of inherent wisdom already present in the mind:

To seek the pearl, we should still the waves; if we disturb the water, it will be hard to get. When the water of meditation is clear, the pearl of the mind will appear of itself. Therefore, the Perfect Enlightenment Sutra says, "Unimpeded, immaculate wisdom always arises dependent on meditation.

== Influence ==
The practice taught in this text seems to be at the core of the dispute in later Chan Buddhism between "sudden" and "gradual" teachings of the "Northern and Southern schools" illustrated in the Platform Sutra. One major distinctions between the "sudden" and "gradual" approach was that the gradual was seen as a way to counteract mental hindrances while the "sudden" approach took metaphysical doctrines of Suchness and non-dual, inherent enlightenment as their theme and saw the practice of counteracting hindrances as counterproductive. Thus while the practice of watching the mind outlined by Zongze remained a central practice in Chan into the Tang dynasty (e.g. in the works of Guifeng Zongmi: "As soon as a thought occurs, be aware of it (nien ch'i chi chueh); as soon as you are aware of it, it will cease to exist. The profound gate of practice lies precisely here.") other, more radical teachers such as Mazu Daoyi emphasized the "celebration of the natural wisdom active in every thought", the idea that "everyday mind is the Way" and radical new methods of practice such as the practices of shouting, spontaneous dialogue and enigmatic sayings or anecdotes. Even so, this simple and pared down style of seated meditation continued to be used by even the most iconoclastic of Chan Buddhists and laid the foundation for the practice known as "silent illumination" or "Shikantaza".

Included in various Chan/Zen monastic codes and text collections, the Zuochan Yi was widely imitated or used as a basis for other texts such as the Ruru Zhushi Zuochan Yi ("Layman Ruru's Principles of Meditation", 1212?) and the Zazen gi by Muhon Kakushin (1207-1297). It was included in the popular Japanese Zen anthology, the Shibu roku ("Fourfold Record"), was quoted by Eisai in the Kazen gokoku ron and used by Dogen in his writing of the Fukanzazengi (Universal Promotion of the Principles of Meditation, CE 1233).
