= Chanyuan Qinggui =

The Chanyuan qinggui (Chinese: 禪苑清規; pinyin: Chányuàn qīngguī; Wade–Giles: Ch'an-yüan ch'ing-kuei; Japanese: 禅苑清規, Zenen Shingi; Korean: Sōnwōn chō'nggyu; Vietnamese: Thiền Uyển Thanh Quy), or The Rules of Purity in the Chan Monastery, is a highly influential set of rules for Chan/Zen monasteries compiled by the Chinese monk Changlu Zongze in 1103. Although many other monastic codes aimed at the Chan/Zen school would follow, Chanyuan qinggui is the oldest extant work of its kind. Prior to the Rules of Purity, various translations of Indian Vinaya texts had existed in China since the fifth century, while Chinese monks beginning with Daoan has created sangha regulations in the 4th century. However, none was extensive or geared towards any particular sect that existed at that time. Both types of regulations has a direct influence on Chanyuan qinggui, but neither aimed to be nearly as extensive or authoritative. The text regulates nearly all aspects of daily life in a monastery, from the proper protocol for ceremonies to the correct way to visit the toilet. It also includes the Zuochan Yi, the earliest known Chan Buddhist guide to sitting meditation.

The text became the standard reference for its topic not only in Song dynasty China, but also well into the Yuan dynasty, as well as abroad in Korea and Japan.
