= Chan Buddhism =

Chinese school of Mahāyāna Buddhism

Chinese name
- Simplified Chinese: 禅
- Traditional Chinese: 禪
Transcriptions
Standard Mandarin
- Hanyu Pinyin: Chán
- Wade–Giles: Ch'an^{2}
Yue: Cantonese
- Jyutping: Sim4
Middle Chinese
- Middle Chinese: Dzyen

Vietnamese name
- Vietnamese alphabet: Thiền
- Chữ Hán: 禪

Korean name
- Hangul: 선
- Hanja: 禪
Transcriptions
- Revised Romanization: Seon

Japanese name
- Kanji: 禅
- Hiragana: ぜん
Transcriptions
- Romanization: Zen

Chan (traditional Chinese: 禪; simplified Chinese: 禅; pinyin: Chán; abbr. of Chinese: 禪那; pinyin: chánnà), from Sanskrit dhyāna (meaning "meditation" or "meditative state" in Buddhism), is a Mahāyāna Chinese Buddhist tradition. It developed in China from the 6th century CE onwards, becoming especially popular during the Tang and Song dynasties. By the Ming and Qing dynasties, it had become one of the most influential forms of Buddhism practiced in China. In contemporary times, it remains one of the most prominent traditions of Chinese Buddhist practice in China, Taiwan, Hong Kong and overseas Chinese communities.

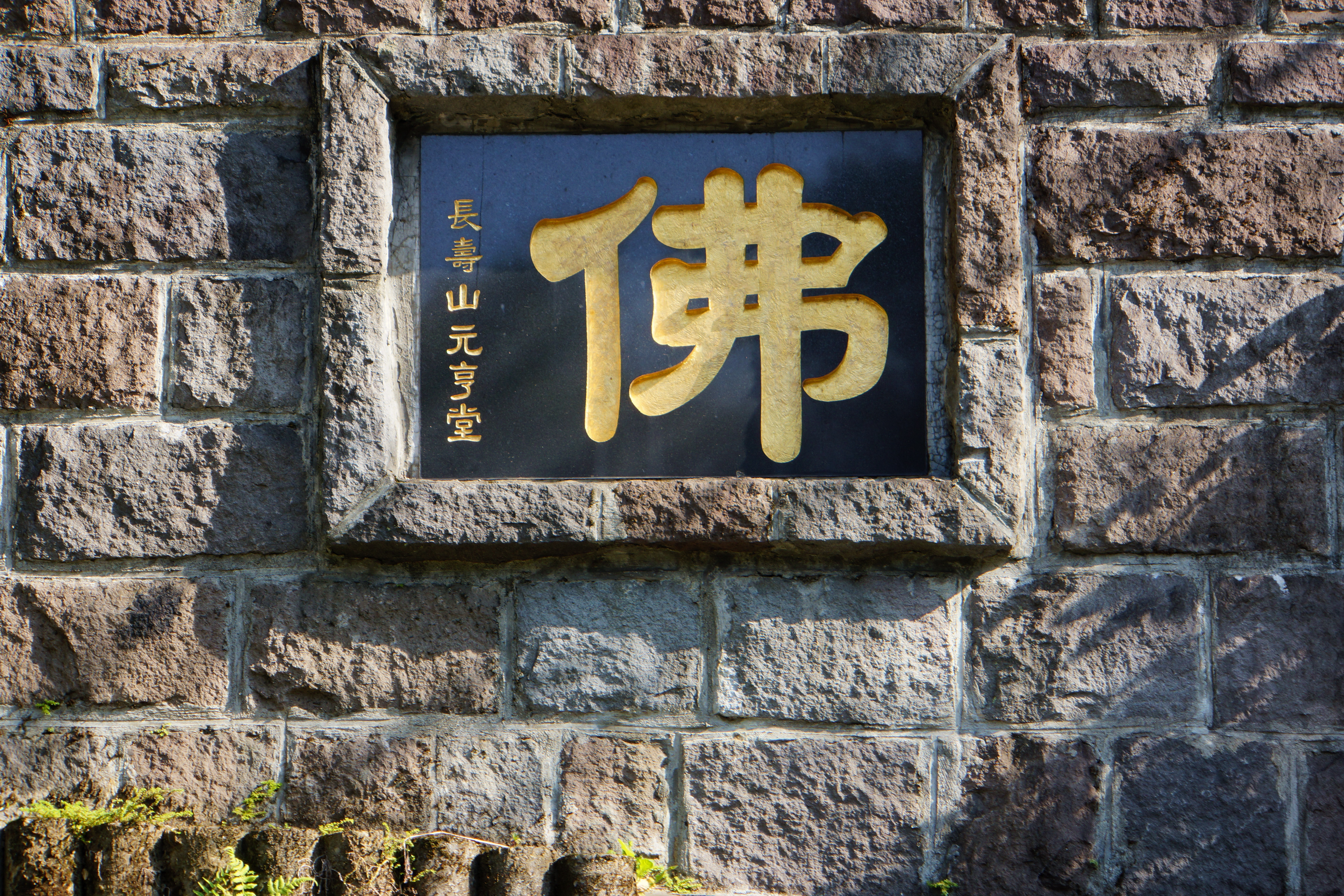
The Chinese character for Buddha, fó on a temple

Chan is the originating tradition of several schools in the Sinosphere, each known by the Sino-Xenic loan forms of the Chinese character for Chan: 禅. It spread south as Thiền in Vietnamese, then north as Korean Seon, and, in the 13th century, east as Zen in Japanese.

A major part of Chan is the practice of meditation, direct insight into one's own Buddha-nature (見性, jianxing), and the personal expression of this insight in daily life for the benefit of others. Some common Chan techniques include the zuochan (meditation done in a sitting posture like the lotus position), contemplation of gong'ans and huatous as well as the nianfo (which usually involves chanting the phrase Namo Amituofo). Most Chan monasteries also typically partake in traditional Buddhist practices like chanting sutras and dharanis (mantras), the taking of Bodhisattva Precepts, walking meditation, rituals and ceremonies, monasticism, and scriptural study.

With an emphasis on Buddha-nature thought, original enlightenment, and sudden awakening, Chan teaching draws from numerous sources, including Sarvāstivāda meditation, the Mahayana teachings on the Bodhisattva path, Yogācāra, and the Tathāgatagarbha (Buddha-nature) as taught in the Laṅkāvatāra Sūtra and the Śūraṅgama Sūtra, and the Huayan school. The Prajñāpāramitā literature, as well as Madhyamaka thought, have also been influential in the shaping of the apophatic and sometimes iconoclastic nature of Chan rhetoric.

== History ==
The historical records required for a complete, accurate account of early Chan history no longer exist.

=== Periodisation ===
The history of Chan in China can be divided into several periods. Chan, as we know it today, is the result of a long history, with many changes and contingent factors. Each period had different types of Chan, some of which remained influential, while others vanished.

Andy Ferguson distinguishes three periods from the 5th century into the 13th century:

1. The Legendary period, from Bodhidharma in the late 5th century to the An Lushan Rebellion around 765 CE, in the middle of the Tang dynasty. Little written information is left from this period. It is the time of the Six Patriarchs, including Bodhidharma and Huineng, and the legendary "split" between the Northern and the Southern School of Chan.
2. The Classical period, from the end of the An Lushan Rebellion around 765 CE to the beginning of the Song dynasty around 950 CE. This is the time of the great masters of Chan, such as Mazu Daoyi and Linji Yixuan, and the creation of the yü-lü genre, the recordings of the sayings and teachings of these great masters.
3. The Literary period, from around 950 to 1250, which spans the era of the Song dynasty (960–1279). In this time, gong'an collections were compiled: collections of sayings and deeds by the famous masters, appended with poetry and commentary. This genre reflects the influence of scholar-officials on the development of Chan. This period idealized the previous period as the "golden age" of Chan, producing the literature in which the spontaneity of the celebrated masters was portrayed.

Although John R. McRae (d. 2011) had reservations about the division of Chan history in phases or periods, he nevertheless distinguishes four phases in the history of Chan:

1. Proto-Chan (c. 500–600), Southern and Northern Dynasties (420 to 589) and Sui dynasty (589–618). In this phase, Chan developed in multiple locations in northern China. It was based on the practice of dhyana and is connected to the figures of Bodhidharma and Huike. Its principal text is the Two Entrances and Four Practices, which is attributed to Bodhidharma. According to McRae, no known lineage theory existed in Proto-Chan, and the connection between it and the Early Chan tradition (consisting of the East Mountain Teaching, Heze School, and Oxhead school) is unclear.
2. Early Chan (c. 600–900), Tang dynasty (618–907). In this phase, Chan took its first clear contours. Prime figures are the fifth patriarch, Daman Hongren (601–674), his dharma-heir Yuquan Shenxiu (606?–706), the sixth patriarch Huineng (638–713, the protagonist of the quintessential Platform Sutra), and Shenhui (670–762), whose works elevated Huineng to the status of sixth patriarch. Prime factions are the East Mountain Teaching, Heze school, and Oxhead school.
3. Middle Chan (c. 750–1000): from the An Lushan rebellion (755–763) until the Five Dynasties and Ten Kingdoms period (907–960/979). In this phase, the well-known Chan of the iconoclastic masters developed. Prime figures are Mazu Daoyi (709–788), Shitou Xiqian (710–790), Linji Yixuan (died 867), and Xuefeng Yicun (822–908). Prime factions are the Hongzhou school and the Hubei faction. (Note: McRae gives no further information on this "Hubei faction". It may be the continuation of Shenxiu's "Northern School". See Nadeau 2012 p.89. Hebei was also the place where the Linji branch of chan arose.) An important text is the Anthology of the Patriarchal Hall (952), which contains many "encounter-stories" and the canon genealogy of the Chan-school.
4. Song dynasty Chan (c. 950–1300). In this phase, Chan took its definitive shape, including the picture of the "golden age" of the Chan of the Tang dynasty, and the use of gong'ans for individual study and meditation. Prime figures are Dahui Zonggao (1089–1163) who introduced the huatou practice, and Hongzhi Zhengjue (1091–1157), who emphasized silent illumination. Prime factions are the Linji school and the Caodong school. The classic gong'an collections, such as the Blue Cliff Record, were assembled in this period, which reflect the influence of the scholars. In this phase, Chan was transported to Japan and exerted a great influence on Seon in Goryeo via Jinul.

Neither Ferguson nor McRae gives a periodisation for Chinese Chan following the Song dynasty, though McRae mentions

[5.] "at least a postclassical phase or perhaps multiple phases". (Note: During the Ming dynasty (1368–1644) and the Qing dynasty (1644–1912) Chan was part of a larger, syncretic Buddhist culture. A final phase can be distinguished from the 19th century onward, when western imperialism had a growing influence in South-East Asia, including China. A side effect of this imperial influence was the modernisation of Asian religions, adapting them to western ideas and rhetorical strategies.)

=== Introduction of Buddhism in China (c. 200–500) ===
==== Sinification of Buddhism and Taoist influences ====
When Buddhism came to China, it was adapted to the Chinese culture and understanding. Theories about the influence of other schools on the evolution of Chan vary widely and rely heavily on speculative correlation rather than on written records or histories. Numerous scholars have argued that Chan developed from the interaction between Mahāyāna Buddhism and Daoism.

Buddhist meditation was practiced in China centuries before the rise of Chan, by people such as An Shigao (c. 148–180 CE) and his school, who translated various dhyāna sutras, which were influential early meditation texts mostly based on the meditation teachings of the Kashmiri Sarvāstivādins (circa 1st–4th centuries). The five main types of meditation in the Dhyana sutras are anapanasati (mindfulness of breathing); paṭikūlamanasikāra meditation, mindfulness of the impurities of the body; maitri meditation; the contemplation on the twelve links of pratītyasamutpāda; and the contemplation on the Buddha's thirty-two Characteristics. Other important translators of meditation texts were Kumārajīva (334–413), who translated The Sutra on the Concentration of Sitting Meditation, amongst many other texts; and Buddhabhadra. These Chinese translations of mostly Indian Sarvāstivādin Yogacara meditation manuals were the basis for the meditation techniques of Chinese Chan.

Buddhism was exposed to Confucian, Daoist and local folk religious influences when it came to China. Goddard quotes D.T. Suzuki, (Note: Godard does not provide a source for this quote) calling Chan a "natural evolution of Buddhism under Taoist conditions". Buddhism was first identified to be "a barbarian variant of Taoism", and Taoist terminology was used to express Buddhist doctrines in the oldest translations of Buddhist texts, a practice termed geyi, "matching the concepts".

Judging from the reception by the Han of the Hinayana works and from the early commentaries, it appears that Buddhism was being perceived and digested through the medium of religious Daoism (Taoism). Buddha was seen as a foreign immortal who had achieved some form of Daoist nondeath. The Buddhists' mindfulness of the breath was regarded as an extension of Daoist breathing exercises.

The first local converts were Daoists. They developed high esteem for the newly introduced meditation techniques, and blended them with neidan (Daoist meditation). Representatives of early Chinese Buddhism like Sengzhao and Tao Sheng were deeply influenced by the Daoist keystone works of Laozi and Zhuangzi. Against this background, especially the concept of ziran (naturalness) was inherited by early Chan disciples: they equated – to some extent – the ineffable Tao and Buddha-nature, and thus, rather than feeling bound to the abstract "wisdom of the sūtras", emphasized Buddha-nature to be found in "everyday" human life, just as the Dao. Daoists initially understood emptiness, śūnyatā, to be akin to the concepts wuji ('ultimate of beinglessness') and wuwei (non-action).

The emerging Chinese Buddhism nevertheless had to compete with Daoism and Confucianism:

Because Buddhism was a foreign influence, however, and everything "barbarian" was suspect, certain Chinese critics were jolted out of complacency by the spread of the dharma [...] In the first four centuries of the Christian Era, this barbarian influence was infiltrating China just when it was least politically stable and more vulnerable to sedition. As the philosophy and practice infiltrated society, many traditionalists banded together to stop the foreign influence, not so much out of intolerance (an attitude flatly rejected by both Taoism and Confucianism), but because they felt that the Chinese worldview was being turned upside down.

One point of confusion for this new emerging Chinese Buddhism was the two truths doctrine. Chinese thinking took this to refer to two ontological truths: reality exists on two levels, a relative level and an absolute level. Indian Madhyamaka philosophy also understood the two truths also as two epistemological truths: two different ways to look at reality. Based on their understanding of the Mahāyāna Mahāparinirvāṇa Sūtra, the Chinese supposed that the teaching of Buddha-nature was, as stated by that sutra, the final Buddhist teaching, and that there is an essential truth above sunyata and the two truths.

==== Divisions of training ====
When Buddhism came to China, there were three divisions of training:

1. The training in virtue and discipline in the precepts (Skt. śila),
2. The training in mind through meditation (Skt. dhyāna) to attain a luminous and non-reactive state of mind, and
3. The training in the recorded teachings (Skt. Dharma).

It was in this context that Buddhism entered into Chinese culture. Three types of teachers with expertise in each training practice developed:

1. Vinaya masters specialized in all the rules of discipline for monks and nuns,
2. Dhyāna masters specialized in the practice of meditation, and
3. Dharma masters specialized in the mastery of the Buddhist texts.

Monasteries and practice centers were created that tended to focus on either the Vinaya and training of monks or the teachings focused on one scripture or a small group of texts. Dhyāna (Chan) masters tended to practice in solitary hermitages, or to be associated with Vinaya training monasteries or the dharma teaching centers. The later naming of the Zen school has its origins in this view of the threefold division of training.

McRae goes so far as to say:

... one important feature must not be overlooked: Chan was not nearly as separate from these other types of Buddhist activities as one might think [...] [T]he monasteries of which Chan monks became abbots were comprehensive institutions, "public monasteries" that supported various types of Buddhist activities other than Chan-style meditation. The reader should bear this point in mind: In contrast to the independent denominations of Soto and Rinzai that emerged (largely by government fiat) in seventeenth-century Japan, there was never any such thing as an institutionally separate Chan "school" at any time in Chinese Buddhist history (emphasis McRae).

=== Legendary or Proto-Chan (c. 500–600) ===
==== Mahākāśyapa and the Flower Sermon ====
The Chan tradition ascribes the origins of Chan in India to the Flower Sermon, the earliest source for which comes from the 14th century. It is said that Gautama Buddha gathered his disciples one day for a Dharma talk. When they gathered together, the Buddha was completely silent and some speculated that perhaps the Buddha was tired or ill. The Buddha silently held up and twirled a flower and his eyes twinkled; several of his disciples tried to interpret what this meant, though none of them were correct. One of the Buddha's disciples, Mahākāśyapa, gazed at the flower and smiled. The Buddha then acknowledged Mahākāśyapa's insight by saying the following:

I possess the true Dharma eye, the marvelous mind of Nirvāṇa, the true form of the formless, the subtle Dharma gate that does not rest on words or letters but is a special transmission outside of the scriptures. This I entrust to Mahākāśyapa.

==== First six patriarchs (c. 500 – early 8th century) ====
Traditionally the origin of Chan in China is credited to Bodhidharma, an Iranian-language speaking Central Asian monk or an Indian monk. The story of his life, and of the Six Patriarchs, was constructed during the Tang to lend credibility to the growing school. Only scarce historical information is available about him, but his hagiography developed when the Chan tradition grew stronger and gained prominence in the early 8th century. By this time, a lineage of the six ancestral founders of Chan had developed.

The actual origins of Chan may lie in Buddhist ascetics who lived in forests and mountains. Huike, "a dhuta (extreme ascetic) who schooled others" and used the Śrīmālādevī Siṃhanāda Sūtra, one of the Tathāgatagarbha sūtras, figures in the stories about Bodhidharma. Huike is regarded as the second Chan patriarch, appointed by Bodhidharma to succeed him. One of Huike's students, Sengcan, to whom is ascribed the Xinxin Ming, is regarded as the third patriarch.

By the late 8th century, under the influence of Huineng's student Shenhui, the traditional list of patriarchs of the Chan lineage had been established:

1. Bodhidharma (達摩) c. 440 – c. 528
2. Dazu Huike (慧可) 487–593
3. Sengcan (僧燦) ?–606
4. Dayi Daoxin (道信) 580–651
5. Daman Hongren (弘忍) 601–674
6. Huineng (惠能) 638–713

In later writings, this lineage was extended to include 28 Indian patriarchs. In the Song of Enlightenment of Yongjia Xuanjue (665–713), one of the chief disciples of Huineng, it is written that Bodhidharma was the 28th patriarch in a line of descent from Mahākāśyapa, a disciple of the Buddha, and the first patriarch of Chan Buddhism.

Mahākāśyapa was the first, leading the line of transmission;
Twenty-eight Fathers followed him in the West;
The Lamp was then brought over the sea to this country;
And Bodhidharma became the First Father here:
His mantle, as we all know, passed over six Fathers,
And by them many minds came to see the Light.

==== Lankavatara Sutra ====
In its beginnings in China, Chan primarily referred to the Mahāyāna sūtras and especially to the Laṅkāvatāra Sūtra. As a result, early masters of the Chan tradition were referred to as "Laṅkāvatāra masters". As the Laṅkāvatāra Sūtra teaches the doctrine of the Ekayāna "One Vehicle", the early Chan school was sometimes referred to as the "One Vehicle School". In other early texts, the school that would later become known as Chan is sometimes even referred to as simply the "Laṅkāvatāra school" (Ch. 楞伽宗, Léngqié Zōng). Accounts recording the history of this early period are to be found in the Records of the Laṅkāvatāra Masters (Chinese: 楞伽師資記).

However, the amount of influence the sūtra actually had in the earliest years of Chan is debated. According to Lai, the Chan tradition used no single text as its scriptural basis until the time of the patriarch Daoxin, who used the Awakening of Faith in the Mahayana. When members of Daoxin's East Mountain Teaching realized that the Awakening of Faith was not a sūtra but a sastra, or commentary, they shifted their scriptural basis to the Awakening of Faith's main inspiration, the Laṅkāvatāra Sūtra, and altered the traditional founding narratives to portray the Laṅkāvatāra as Chan's most essential scripture.

==== Bodhidharma ====
Bodhidharma with Dazu Huike. Painting by Sesshū Tōyō, 15th century.

Bodhidharma is recorded as having come into China during the time of the Southern and Northern dynasties to teach a "special transmission outside scriptures" which "did not stand upon words". Throughout Buddhist art, Bodhidharma is depicted as a rather ill-tempered, profusely bearded and wide-eyed barbarian. He is referred to as "The Blue-Eyed Barbarian" (碧眼胡) in Chan texts. (Note: Soothill, William Edward; Hodous, Lewis (1995), A Dictionary of Chinese Buddhist Terms, London: RoutledgeCurzon) Only scarce historical information is available about him, but his hagiography developed when the Chan tradition grew stronger and gained prominence in the early 8th century. By this time, a lineage of the six ancestral founders of Chan in China had developed.

Little contemporary biographical information on Bodhidharma is extant, and subsequent accounts became layered with legend. There are three principal sources for Bodhidharma's biography: The Record of the Buddhist Monasteries of Luoyang by Yang Xuanzhi (547), Tan Lin's preface to the Two Entrances and Four Practices (6th century), and Dayi Daoxin's Further Biographies of Eminent Monks (7th century).

These sources vary in their account of Bodhidharma being either "from Persia" (547), "a Brahman monk from South India" (645), "the third son of a Brahman king of South India" (c. 715 CE). Some traditions specifically describe Bodhidharma to be the third son of a Pallava king from Kanchipuram.

The Long Scroll of the Treatise on the Two Entrances and Four Practices, written by Tan Lin (506–574), contains teachings attributed to Bodhidharma. The text is known from the Dunhuang manuscripts. The two entrances to enlightenment are the entrance of principle and the entrance of practice:

The entrance of principle is to become enlightened to the Truth on the basis of the teaching. One must have a profound faith in the fact that one and the same True Nature is possessed by all sentient beings, both ordinary and enlightened, and that this True Nature is only covered up and made imperceptible [in the case of ordinary people] by false sense impressions".

The entrance of practice includes the following four increments:

1. Practice of the retribution of enmity: to accept all suffering as the fruition of past transgressions, without enmity or complaint
2. Practice of the acceptance of circumstances: to remain unmoved even by good fortune, recognizing it as evanescent
3. Practice of the absence of craving: to be without craving, which is the source of all suffering
4. Practice of accordance with the Dharma: to eradicate wrong thoughts and practice the six perfections, without having any "practice".

This text was used and studied by Huike and his students. The True Nature refers to the Buddha-nature.

==== Huike ====
Bodhidharma settled in Northern Wei China. Shortly before his death, Bodhidharma appointed his disciple Dazu Huike to succeed him, making Huike the first Chinese-born ancestral founder and the second ancestral founder of Chan in China. Bodhidharma is said to have passed three items to Huike as a sign of transmission of the Dharma: a robe, a bowl, and a copy of the Laṅkāvatāra Sūtra. The transmission then passed to the second ancestral founder Dazu Huike, the third Sengcan, the fourth ancestral founder Dayi Daoxin, and the fifth ancestral founder Daman Hongren.

=== Early Chan in Tang China (c. 600–900) ===
==== East Mountain Teachings ====
With the fourth patriarch, Daoxin (道信 580–651), Chan began to take shape as a distinct school. The link between Huike and Sengcan, and the fourth patriarch Daoxin "is far from clear and remains tenuous". With Daoxin and his successor, the fifth patriarch Hongren (弘忍 601–674), there emerged a new style of teaching, which was inspired by the Chinese text Awakening of Faith in the Mahayana. According to McRae, the "first explicit statement of the sudden and direct approach that was to become the hallmark of Ch'an religious practice" is associated with the East Mountain School. It is a method named "Maintaining the one without wavering" (shouyi puii, 守一不移), the one being the nature of mind, which is equated with Buddha-nature. In this practice, one turns the attention from the objects of experience, to the perceiving subject itself. According to McRae, this type of meditation resembles the methods of "virtually all schools of Mahayana Buddhism," but differs in that "no preparatory requirements, no moral prerequisites or preliminary exercises are given," and is "without steps or gradations. One concentrates, understands, and is enlightened, all in one undifferentiated practice." (Note: It first appears in a Chinese text named the Ju-tao an-hsin yao-fang-pien fa-men (JTFM, Instructions on essential expedients for calming the mind and accessing the path), itself a part of the Leng Ch'ieh Shih Tzu Chi (Records of the Masters of the Lankavatara). The Records of the Masters of the Lankavatara is associated with the early Chan tradition known as the "East Mountain School" and has been dated to around 713.) Sharf notes that the notion of "Mind" came to be criticised by radical subitists, and was replaced by "No Mind," to avoid any reifications. (Note: Compare Mazu's "Mind is Buddha" versus "No mind, no Buddha": "When Ch'an Master Fa-ch'ang of Ta-mei Mountain went to see the Patriarch for the first time, he asked, "What is Buddha?" The Patriarch replied, "Mind is Buddha." [On hearing this] Fa-ch'ang had great awakening. Later he went to live on Ta-mei mountain. When the Patriarch heard that he was residing on the mountain, he sent one of his monks to go there and ask Fa-ch'ang, "What did the Venerable obtain when he saw Ma-tsu, so that he has come to live on this mountain?" Fach'ang said, "Ma-tsu told me that mind is Buddha; so I came to live here." The monk said, "Ma-tsu's teaching has changed recently." Fa-ch'ang asked, "What is the difference?" The monk said, "Nowadays he also says, 'Neither mind nor Buddha."' Fa-ch'ang said, "That old man still hasn't stopped confusing people. You can have 'neither mind nor Buddha,' I only care for 'mind is Buddha."' The monk returned to the Patriarch and reported what has happened. "The plum is ripe." said the Patriarch.") Concepts such as Tiyong (體用, lit: "Essence and Function") and Lishi (理事, lit: "Noumenon and Phenomenon" or "Principle and Practice") which first appeared in Huayen Buddhism also consequently influenced Chan deeply. For instance, the concept of tiyong appears in the Platform Sutra.

A large group of students gathered at a permanent residence, and extreme asceticism became outdated. The period of Daoxin and Hongren came to be called the East Mountain Teaching, due to the location of the residence of Hongren at Huangmei. The term was used by Yuquan Shenxiu (神秀 606?–706), the most important successor to Hongren. By this time the group had grown into a matured congregation that became significant enough to be reckoned with by the ruling forces. The East Mountain community was a specialized meditation training centre. Hongren was a plain meditation teacher, who taught students of "various religious interests", including "practitioners of the Lotus Sutra, students of Madhyamaka philosophy, or specialists in the monastic regulations of Buddhist Vinaya". The school was typified by a "loose practice," aiming to make meditation accessible to a larger audience. Shenxiu used short formulas extracted from various sutras to package the teachings, a style which is also used in the Platform Sutra. The establishment of a community in one location was a change from the wandering lives of Bodhidharma and Huike and their followers. It fitted better into the Chinese society, which highly valued community-oriented behaviour, instead of solitary practice.

In 701 Shenxiu was invited to the Imperial Court by Zhou Empress Wu Zetian, who paid him due to imperial reverence. The first lineage documents were produced in this period:

[T]he genealogical presentation of the Chan transmission was first recorded on paper in the early years of metropolitan Chan activity. The earliest recorded instance of this was in the epitaph for a certain Faru, a student of Hongren's who died in 689, and by the second decade of the 8th century, the later followers of Hongren had produced two separate texts describing the transmission from Bodhidharma to Shenxiu.

The transition from the East Mountain to the two capitals changed the character of Chan:

[I]t was only when Hongren's successors moved into the environment of the two capitals, with its literate society and incomparably larger urban scale, that well-written texts were required for disseminating the teaching.

==== Southern School – Huineng and Shenhui ====
Huineng tearing sutras

According to tradition, the sixth and last ancestral founder, Huineng (惠能; 638–713), was one of the giants of Chan history, and all surviving schools regard him as their ancestor. The dramatic story of Huineng's life tells that there was a controversy over his claim to the title of patriarch. After being chosen by Hongren, the fifth ancestral founder, Huineng had to flee by night to Nanhua Temple in the south to avoid the wrath of Hongren's jealous senior disciples.

Modern scholarship, however, has questioned this narrative. Historic research reveals that this story was created around the middle of the 8th century, as part of a campaign to win influence at the Imperial Court in 731 by a successor to Huineng called Shenhui. He claimed Huineng to be the successor of Hongren instead of Shenxiu, the recognized successor. A dramatic story of Huineng's life was created, as narrated in the Platform Sutra, which tells that there was a contest for the transmission of the title of patriarch. After being chosen by Hongren, the fifth patriarch, Huineng had to flee by night to Nanhua Temple in the south to avoid the wrath of Hongren's jealous senior disciples. Shenhui succeeded in his campaign, and Huineng eventually came to be regarded as the Sixth Patriarch. In 745 Shenhui was invited to take up residence in the Heze Temple in the capital, Dongdu (modern Luoyang) In 753, he fell out of grace and had to leave Dongdu to go into exile.

The most prominent of the successors of Shenhui's lineage was Guifeng Zongmi. According to Zongmi, Shenhui's approach was officially sanctioned in 796, when "an imperial commission determined that the Southern line of Chan represented the orthodox transmission and established Shen-hui as the seventh patriarch, placing an inscription to that effect in the Shen-lung temple".

Doctrinally, Shenhui's "Southern School" is associated with the teaching that enlightenment is sudden while the "Northern" or East Mountain school is associated with the teaching that enlightenment is gradual. This was a polemical exaggeration since both schools were derived from the same tradition, and the so-called Southern School incorporated many teachings of the more influential Northern School. Eventually both schools died out, but the influence of Shenhui was so immense that all later Chan schools traced their origin to Huineng, and "sudden enlightenment" became a standard doctrine of Chan.

Shenhui's influence is traceable in the Platform Sutra, which gives a popular account of the story of Huineng but also reconciles the antagonism created by Shenhui. Salient is that Shenhui himself does not figure in the Platform Sutra; he was effectively written out of Chan history. The Platform Sutra also reflects the growing popularity of the Diamond Sūtra (Vajracchedikā Prajñāpāramitā Sūtra) in 8th-century Chinese Buddhism. Thereafter, the essential texts of the Chan school were often considered to be both the Laṅkāvatāra Sūtra and the Diamond Sūtra. The Laṅkāvatāra Sūtra, which endorses the Buddha-nature, emphasized purity of mind, which can be attained in gradations. The Diamond-sutra emphasizes sunyata, which "must be realized totally or not at all". David Kalupahana associates the later Caodong school (Japanese Sōtō, gradual) and Linji school (Japanese Rinzai school, sudden) schools with the Yogacara and Madhyamaka philosophies respectively. The same comparison has been made by McRae. The Madhyamaka school elaborated on the theme of śūnyatā, which was set forth in the prajnaparamita sutras, to which the Diamond Sutra also belongs. The shift from the Laṅkāvatāra Sūtra to the Diamond Sutra also signifies a tension between Buddha-nature teachings, which imply a transcendental reality, versus śūnyatā, which denies such a transcendental reality.

=== Tibetan Chan ===
Chinese Chan Buddhist teachers such as Moheyan first went to Tibet in the eighth century during the height of the Tibetan Empire. There seems to have been disputes between them and Indian Buddhists, as exemplified by the Samye debate. Many Tibetan Chan texts have been recovered from the caves at Dunhuang, where Chan and Tantric Buddhists lived side by side and this led to religious syncretism in some cases. Chan Buddhism survived in Tibet for several centuries, but had mostly been replaced by the 10th century developments in Tibetan Buddhism. According to Sam Van Schaik:

After the 'dark period', all visible influences of Chan were eliminated from Tibetan Buddhism, and Mahayoga and Chan were carefully distinguished from each other. This trend can already be observed in the tenth-century Lamp for the Eyes in Contemplation by the great central Tibetan scholar Gnubs chen Sangs rgyas ye shes. This influential work represented a crucial step in the codification of Chan, Mahayoga and the Great Perfection as distinct vehicles to enlightenment. In comparison, our group of [Dunhuang] manuscripts exhibits remarkable freedom, blurring the lines between meditation systems that were elsewhere kept quite distinct. The system of practice set out in these manuscripts did not survive into the later Tibetan tradition. Indeed, this creative integration of meditation practices derived from both Indic and Chinese traditions could only have been possible during the earliest years of Tibetan Buddhism, when doctrinal categories were still forming, and in this sense, it represents an important stage in the Tibetan assimilation of Buddhism.

=== Classical or Middle Chan – Tang dynasty (c. 750–1000) ===
Daoxin, Hongren, Shenxiu, Huineng and Shenhui all lived during the early Tang. The later period of the Tang dynasty is traditionally regarded as the "golden age" of Chan. This proliferation is described in a famous saying:

Look at the territory of the house of Tang —
The whole of it is the realm of the Chan school.

==== An Lushan rebellion ====
The An Lushan Rebellion (755–763) led to a loss of control by the Tang dynasty, and changed the Chan scene again. Metropolitan Chan began to lose its status, while "other schools were arising in outlying areas controlled by warlords. These are the forerunners of the Chan we know today. Their origins are obscure; the power of Shen-hui's preaching is shown by the fact that they all trace themselves to Hui-neng."

==== Hongzhou School ====
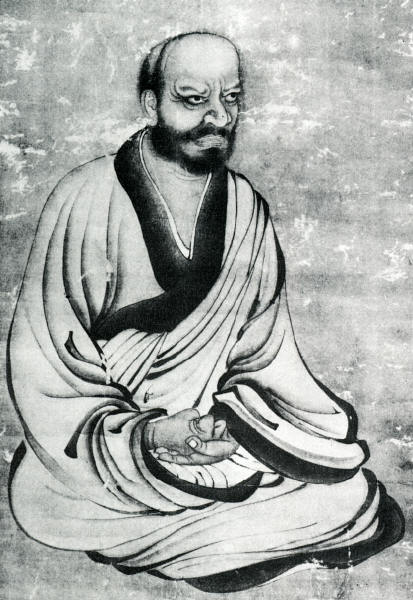
Linji

The most important of these schools is the Hongzhou school (洪州宗) of Mazu, to which also belong Dazhu Huihai, Baizhang Huaihai, Huangbo and Linji (Rinzai). Linji is also regarded as the founder of one of the Five Houses.

This school developed "shock techniques such as shouting, beating, and using irrational retorts to startle their students into realization". Some of these are common today, while others are found mostly in anecdotes. It is common in many Chan traditions today for Chan teachers to have a stick with them during formal ceremonies which is a symbol of authority and which can be also used to strike on the table during a talk.

These shock techniques became part of the traditional and still popular image of Chan masters displaying irrational and strange behaviour to aid their students. Part of this image was due to later misinterpretations and translation errors, such as the loud belly shout known as he (喝, Japanese: katsu). "He" means "to shout", which has sometimes been translated as "yelled 'katsu'" – which should mean "yelled a yell". (Note: See James D. Sellmann & Hans Julius Schneider (2003), Liberating Language in Linji and Wittgenstein. Asian Philosophy, Vol. 13, Nos. 2/3, 2003. Notes 26 and 41)

A well-known story depicts Mazu practicing dhyana, but being rebuked by his teacher Nanyue Huairang, comparing seated meditation with polishing a tile. According to Faure, the criticism is not about dhyana as such, but "the idea of "becoming a Buddha" by means of any practice, lowered to the standing of a "means" to achieve an "end"". The criticism of seated dhyana reflects a change in the role and position of monks in Tang society, who "undertook only pious works, reciting sacred texts and remaining seated in dhyana". Nevertheless, seated dhyana remained an important part of the Chan tradition, also due to the influence of Guifeng Zongmi, who tried to balance dhyana and insight.

The Hung-chou school has been criticised for its radical subitism. Guifeng Zongmi (圭峰 宗密) (780–841), an influential teacher-scholar who was a Patriarch of both the Chan and the Huayan traditions, claimed that the Hongzhou school teaching led to a radical nondualism that denies the need for spiritual cultivation and moral discipline. While Zongmi acknowledged that the essence of Buddha-nature and its functioning in the day-to-day reality are but different aspects of the same reality, he insisted that there is a difference.

==== Shitou Xiqian ====
Traditionally Shitou Xiqian (Ch. 石頭希遷, c. 700 – c.790) is seen as the other great figure of this period. In the Chan lineages he is regarded as the predecessor of the Caodong (Sōtō) school. He is also regarded as the author of the Cantongqi, a poem which formed the basis for the Song of the Precious Mirror Samadhi of Dongshan Liangjie (Jp. Tōzan Ryōkan) and the teaching of the Five Ranks.

==== The Great Persecution ====
During 845–846 Emperor Wuzong persecuted the Buddhist schools in China:

It was a desperate attempt on the part of the hard-pressed central government, which had been in disarray since the An Lu-shan rebellion of 756, to gain some measure of political, economic, and military relief by preying on the Buddhist temples with their immense wealth and extensive lands.

This persecution was devastating for metropolitan Chan, but the Chan school of Mazu and his likes had survived, and took a leading role in the Chan of the later Tang.

==== Five Dynasties and Ten Kingdoms Period (907–960/979) ====
After the fall of the Tang dynasty, China was without effective central control during the Five Dynasties and Ten Kingdoms Period. China was divided into several autonomous regions. Support for Buddhism was limited to a few areas. The Huayan and Tiantai schools suffered from the changing circumstances, since they had depended on imperial support. The collapse of Tang society also deprived the aristocratic classes of wealth and influence, which meant a further drawback for Buddhism. Shenxiu's Northern School and Henshui's Southern School didn't survive the changing circumstances. Nevertheless, Chan emerged as the dominant stream within Chinese Buddhism, but with various schools developing various emphasises in their teachings, due to the regional orientation of the period. The Fayan school, named after Fayan Wenyi (885–958) became the dominant school in the southern kingdoms of Nan-Tang (Jiangxi) and Wuyue (Zhejiang). Chan teachings were also synthesized together with the doctrines of the other traditions of Chinese Buddhism. A notable example during this period is the eminent Chan master and Pure Land Patriarch, Yongming Yanshou, who held that scriptural study and Chan realization are not separate paths, and that Chan praxis was compatible with the study of scripture and Buddhist philosophy. Yanshou promoted a synthesis of the diverse teachings of the Chinese Buddhist schools of his time, including Chan, Tiantai, Huayan, Weishi, and Pure Land, and was a famous advocate of the dual-practice of Chan and Pure Land (禪淨雙修, chanjing shuangxiu) in particular. Some of the techniques he taught includes chanting the nianfo during zuochan (sitting meditation) as well as when circumambulating a Buddha image. Yanshou saw Chan as encompassing all Mahayana practices, and quotes from numerous sources including various Chan patriarchs and texts, as well as the works of the Huayan, Tiantai, Sanlun, and Weishi schools in his teachings.

=== Literary Chan – Song dynasty (c. 960–1300) ===
The Five Dynasties and Ten Kingdoms Period was followed by the Song dynasty, which established a strong central government. During the Song dynasty, Chan (禪) was used by the government to strengthen its control over the country, and Chan grew to become the largest tradition in Chinese Buddhism. An ideal picture of the Chan of the Tang period was produced, which served the legacy of this newly acquired status:

In the Song dynasty (960–1279), Chinese Chan Buddhism reached something of a climax paradigm. By "climax paradigm", I mean a conceptual configuration by which Chan was described in written texts, practiced by its adherents, and by extension understood as a religious entity by the Chinese population as a whole ... Previous events in Chan were interpreted through the lens of the Song dynasty configuration, and subsequent developments in China, Korea, Japan, and Vietnam were evaluated, even as they occurred, against what was known of the standards established during the Song. Thus the romanticized image of the great Tang dynasty masters – Mazu and his students, Caoshan, Dongshan, and their students, and of course Linji – was generated by Song dynasty authors and functioned within Song dynasty texts. Similarly, even where subsequent figures throughout East Asia – Hakuin Ekaku (1685–1769), the famous reviver of Japanese Rinzai, is the best example – evoke the examples of Bodhidharma, the Sixth Patriarch Huineng, Mazu, and the others, they do so through the conceptual filter of Song-dynasty Chan.

==== Five Houses of Chan ====
During the Song the Five Houses (Ch. 五家) of Chan, or five "schools", were recognized. These were not originally regarded as "schools" or "sects", but based on the various Chan-genealogies. Historically they have come to be understood as "schools".

The Five Houses of Chan are:

- Guiyang school (潙仰宗), named after masters Guishan Lingyou (771–854) and Yangshan Huiji (813–890), dharma-descendants of Mazu Daoyi;
- Linji school (臨濟宗), named after master Linji Yixuan (died 866), whose lineage came to be traced to Mazu, establishing him as the archetypal iconoclastic Chan-master;
- Caodong school (曹洞宗), named after masters Dongshan Liangjie (807–869) and Caoshan Benji (840–901);
- Yunmen school (雲門宗), named after master Yunmen Wenyan (died 949), a student of Xuefeng Yicun (822–908), whose lineage was traced to Shitou Xiqian:
- Fayan school (法眼宗), named after master Fayan Wenyi (885–958), a "grand-student" of Xuefeng Yicun.

==== Rise of the Linji-school ====
The Linji-school became the dominant school within Chan, due to support from the literati and the court. Before the Song dynasty, the Linji-school is rather obscure, and very little is known about its early history. The first mention of Linji is in the Zutang ji, compiled in 952, 86 years after Linji's death. But the Zutang ji pictures the Xuefeng Yicun lineage as heir to the legacy of Mazu and the Hongzhou-school.

According to Welter, the real founder of the Linji-school was Shoushan (or Baoying) Shengnian (首山省念) (926–993), a fourth generation dharma-heir of Linji. The Tiansheng Guangdeng lu (天聖廣燈錄), "Tiansheng Era Expanded Lamp Record", compiled by the official Li Zunxu (李遵勗) (988–1038) confirms the status of Shoushan Shengnian, but also pictures Linji as a major Chan patriarch and heir to the Mazu, displacing the prominence of the Fayan-lineage. It also established the slogan of "a special transmission outside the teaching", supporting the Linji-school claim of "Chan as separate from and superior to all other Buddhist teachings".

==== Dahui Zonggao ====
Over the course of Song dynasty (960–1279), the Guiyang, Fayan, and Yunmen schools were gradually absorbed into the Linji. Song Chan was dominated by the Linji school of Dahui Zonggao, which in turn became strongly affiliated to the Imperial Court:

... the Ta-hui school of Sung Chan had become closely associated with the Sung court, high officials, and the literati [...] With the establishment of the Wu-shan (Gozan) system during the Southern Sung the school of Ta-hui took precedence. The Chinese bureaucratic system entered into Chan temples throughout the country, and a highly organized system of temple rank and administration developed.

The Wushan system (Five Mountain System) was a system of state-controlled temples, which were established by the Song government in all provinces. Records by the Ming dynasty (1368–1644) historian Song Lian state that the Five Mountains system was first established during the Jiading period (1208–1224) of the Southern Song by Emperor Ningzong at the request of the official Shi Miyuan (who was a follower of the eminent Chan master Dahui Zonggao), although alternative accounts of the creation of the system exists in other records. The main Five Temples, known as Wushan (五山), were selected around the then temporary Southern Song capital of Lin'an (located around modern-day Hangzhou in Zhejiang), and high-ranking monks were appointed as abbots by imperial order on a rotating basis. Immediately below the five Wushan temples are another ten called the Shicha (十刹). This list of categorizations was continued in succeeding dynasties, and separate rankings exist for both the Chan Buddhist tradition and the scriptural Buddhist tradition (which broadly includes traditions like Tiantai and Huayan).

==== Gong'an-system ====
The teaching styles and words of the classical masters were recorded in the so-called "encounter dialogues". Snippets of these encounter dialogues were collected in texts as the Blue Cliff Record (1125) of Yuanwu, The Gateless Gate (1228) of Wumen, both of the Linji lineage, and the Book of Equanimity (1223) by Wansong Xingxiu of the Caodong lineage.

These texts became classic gong'an cases, together with verse and prose commentaries, which crystallized into the systematized gong'an practice (known as koan in Japanese). According to Miura and Sasaki, "[I]t was during the lifetime of Yüan-wu's successor, Dahui Zonggao (大慧宗杲; 1089–1163) that Koan Chan entered its determinative stage." Gong'an practice was prevalent in the Linji school, to which Yuanwu and Dahui belonged, but it was also employed on a more limited basis by the Caodong school.

The recorded encounter dialogues, and the gong'an collections which derived from this genre, mark a shift from solitary practice to the interaction between master and student:

The essence of enlightenment came to be identified with the interaction between masters and students. Whatever insight dhyana might bring, its verification was always interpersonal. In effect, enlightenment came to be understood not so much as an insight, but as a way of acting in the world with other people

This mutual enquiry of the meaning of the encounters of masters and students of the past gave students a role model:

One looked at the enlightened activities of one's lineal forebears in order to understand one's own identity [...] taking the role of the participants and engaging in their dialogues instead (Note: This role-taking is described by the Swedish psychologist of religion Hjalmar Sundén, though McRae does not seem to be aware of this) Koan practice was a literary practice, styling snippets of encounter-dialogue into well-edited stories. It arose in interaction with "educated literati".

There were dangers involved in such a literary approach, such as fixing specific meanings to the cases. Dahui Zonggao is even said to have burned the woodblocks of the Blue Cliff Record, for the hindrance it had become to study of Chan by his students

==== Silent illumination ====
The Caodong tradition was the other school to survive into the Song period. Its main protagonist was Hongzhi Zhengjue, a contemporary of Dahui Zonggao. It put emphasis on "silent illumination", or "just sitting". This approach was attacked by Dahui as being mere passivity, and lacking emphasis on gaining insight into one's true nature. Zhengjue in his turn criticized the emphasis on gong'an study.

=== Post-classical Chan (c. 1300–present) ===
==== Yuan dynasty (1279–1368) ====
The Yuan dynasty was the empire established by Kublai Khan, the leader of the Borjigin clan, after the Mongol Empire conquered the Jin dynasty (1115–1234) and the Southern Song dynasty. Chan continued to practiced alongside Pure Land as in the teachings of Zhongfeng Mingben (1263–1323). During this period, other Chan lineages, not necessarily connected with the original lineage, began to emerge with the 108th Chan Patriarch, Dhyānabhadra active in both China and Korea.

==== Ming dynasty (1368–1644) ====
Together with other Buddhist traditions such as Tiantai, Chan Buddhism enjoyed a revival in the Ming dynasty, with eminent teachers such as Hanshan Deqing (憨山德清), who wrote and taught extensively on both Chan and Pure Land Buddhism; Miyun Yuanwu (密雲圓悟), who came to be seen posthumously as the first patriarch of the Ōbaku school of Zen; as well as Yunqi Zhuhong (雲棲祩宏), who integrated both Chan and Pure Land thought and who was a great monastic reformer who compiled and edited many influential liturgical and ritual texts. Chan was taught alongside other Buddhist traditions such as Pure Land, Huayan, Tiantai and Zhenyan Buddhism in many monasteries. In continuity with Buddhism in the previous dynasties, Buddhist masters taught integrated teachings from the various traditions as opposed to advocating for any sectarian delineation between the various schools of thought. This can be seen from how various prominent monastics of this period who were Chan practitioners also wrote various teachings and commentaries from the perspective of other Buddhist traditions, sometimes directly integrating teachings and practices from other traditions into Chan. One example is the eminent monk Ouyi Zhixu (蕅益智旭), who was also a Patriarch of both the Tiantai tradition as well as the Chinese Pure Land tradition but who was also a Chan practitioner. With the downfall of the Ming, some Chan masters fled to Japan, founding the Ōbaku school.

==== Qing dynasty (1644–1912) ====
At the beginning of the Qing dynasty, Chan was revitalized by the "revival of beating and shouting practices" by Miyun Yuanwu (1566–1642), and the publication of the Wudeng yantong ("The strict transmission of the five Chan schools") by Feiyin Tongrong's (1593–1662), a dharma heir of Miyun Yuanwu. The book placed self-proclaimed Chan monks without proper Dharma transmission in the category of "lineage unknown" (sifa weixiang), thereby excluding several prominent Caodong monks.

=== Modernisation ===
==== 19th century (late Qing dynasty) ====
Around 1900, Buddhists from other Asian countries showed a growing interest in Chinese Buddhism. Anagarika Dharmapala visited Shanghai in 1893, intending "to make a tour of China, to arouse the Chinese Buddhists to send missionaries to India to restore Buddhism there, and then to start a propaganda throughout the whole world", but eventually limiting his stay to Shanghai. Japanese Buddhist missionaries were active in China in the beginning of the 20th century.

==== Republic of China (1912–1949) – First Buddhist Revival ====
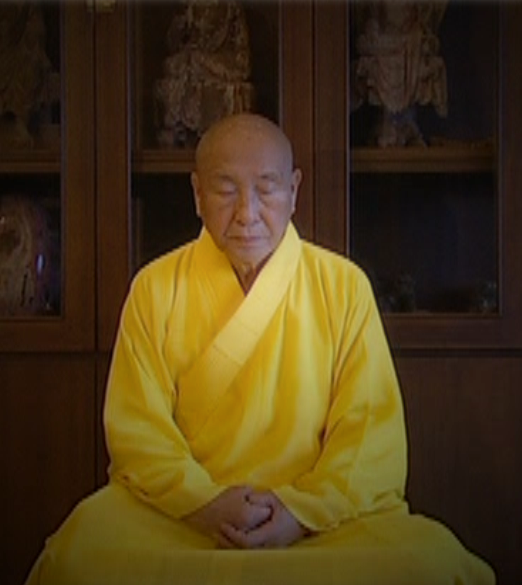
Traditional Chan Buddhist Grand Master Wei Chueh in Taiwan, sitting in meditation

The modernisation of China led to the end of the Chinese Empire, and the installation of the Republic of China, which lasted on the mainland until the Communist Revolution and the installation of the People's Republic of China in 1949.

After having experienced a decline by the end of the Qing dynasty, Chan was reinvigorated again in the early 20th century by Hsu Yun (虛雲), a well-known figure of 20th-century Chinese Buddhism. Many Chan teachers today trace their lineage to Hsu Yun, including Sheng Yen (聖嚴) and Hsuan Hua (宣化), who have propagated Chan in the West where it has grown steadily through the 20th and 21st century.

The Buddhist reformist Taixu propagated a Chan-influenced humanistic Buddhism, which is endorsed by Jing Hui, former abbot of Bailin Monastery.

Until 1949, monasteries were built in the Southeast Asian countries, for example by monks of Guanghua Monastery, to spread Chinese Buddhism. Presently, Guanghua Monastery has seven branches in the Malay Peninsula and Indonesia.

==== People's Republic of China (1949–present) – Second Buddhist Revival ====
Chan was repressed in China during the recent modern era in the early periods of the People's Republic, but subsequently has been re-asserting itself on the mainland, and has a significant following in Taiwan and Hong Kong as well as among Overseas Chinese.

Since the reform and opening up of the 1970s, a new revival of Chinese Buddhism has been ongoing. Ancient Buddhist temples, such as Bailin Monastery and Guanghua Monastery have been refurbished.

Bailin Monastery was ruined long before 1949. In 1988, Jing Hui was persuaded to take over the Hebei Buddhist Association, and start rebuilding the Monastery. Jing Hui is a student and dharma successor of Hsu Yun, but has also adopted the Humanistic Buddhism of Taixu. (Note: See for more information on Jinghui.) (Note: At least two westerners are, or claim, to be dharma successors to Jing Hui: Lily-Marie Johnson (Ming Qi) and Daniel Odier. (Note: Biography (at bottom of the page)))

Guanghua Monastery was restored beginning in 1979, when a six-year restoration program began under the supervision of then 70-year-old Venerable Master Yuanzhou (圆拙老法师). In 1983 the temple became one of the Chinese Buddhism Regional Temples (汉族地区全国重点寺院) whilst 36-year-old Master Yiran (毅然法師) became abbot. The same year, Venerable Master Yuanzhou funded the establishment of the new Fujian Buddhism Academy (福建佛学院) on the site.

==== Taiwan ====
Several Chinese Buddhist teachers left China during the Communist Revolution, and settled in Hong Kong and Taiwan.

Sheng Yen (1930–2009) was the founder of the Dharma Drum Mountain, a Buddhist organization based in Taiwan. During his time in Taiwan, Sheng Yen was well known as one of the progressive Buddhist teachers who sought to teach Buddhism in a modern and Western-influenced world. Sheng yen published over 30 Chan texts in English.

Wei Chueh (1928–2016) was born in Sichuan, China, and ordained in Taiwan. In 1982, he founded Lin Quan Temple in Taipei County and became known for his teaching on Chan practices by offering many lectures and seven-day Chan retreats. His order is called Chung Tai Shan.

Two additional traditions emerged in the 1960s, based their teaching on Chan practices.

Cheng Yen (born 1937), a Buddhist nun, founded the Tzu Chi Foundation as a charity organization with Buddhist ethics on May 14, 1966, in Hualien, Taiwan. She was inspired by her master and mentor, the late Venerable Master Yin Shun (印順導師; Yìn Shùn dǎoshī) a proponent of Humanistic Buddhism, who exhorted her to "work for Buddhism and for all sentient beings". The organisation began with a motto of "instructing the rich and saving the poor" as a group of thirty housewives who donated a small amount of money each day to care for needy families.

Hsing Yun (1927–2023), founded the Fo Guang Shan an international Chinese Buddhist new religious movement based in Taiwan in 1967. The order promotes Humanistic Buddhism. Fo Guang Shan also calls itself the International Buddhist Progress Society. The headquarters of Fo Guang Shan, located in Dashu District, Kaohsiung, is the largest Buddhist monastery in Taiwan. Hsing Yun's stated position within Fo Guang Shan is that it is an "amalgam of all Eight Schools of Chinese Buddhism" (八宗兼弘), including Chan. Fo Guang Shan is the most comprehensive of the major Buddhist organizations of Taiwan, focusing extensively on both social works and religious engagement.

In Taiwan, these four masters are popularly referred to as the "Four Heavenly Kings" of Taiwanese Buddhism, with their respective organizations Dharma Drum Mountain, Chung Tai Shan, Tzu Chi, and Fo Guang Shan being referred to as the "Four Great Mountains".

== Spread of Chan Buddhism in Asia ==
=== Thiền in Vietnam ===
According to traditional accounts of Vietnam, in 580 an Indian monk named Vinitaruci (Vietnamese: Tì-ni-đa-lưu-chi) traveled to Vietnam after completing his studies with Sengcan, the third patriarch of Chinese Chan. This, then, would be the first appearance of Thiền Buddhism. Other early Thiền schools included that of Wu Yantong (Chinese: 無言通; Vietnamese: Vô Ngôn Thông), which was associated with the teachings of Mazu Daoyi, and the Thảo Đường (Caodong), which incorporated nianfo chanting techniques; both were founded by Chinese monks.

=== Seon in Korea ===
Seon was gradually transmitted into Korea during the late Silla period (7th through 9th centuries) as Korean monks of predominantly Hwaeom (Korean: 화엄종; Hanja: 華嚴宗) and East Asian Yogācāra (Korean: 유식종; Hanja: 唯識宗) background began to travel to China to learn the newly developing tradition. Seon received its most significant impetus and consolidation from the Goryeo monk Jinul (知訥) (1158–1210), who established a reform movement and introduced kōan practice to Korea. Jinul established the Songgwangsa (松廣寺) as a new center of pure practice.

=== Zen in Japan ===
Zen was not introduced as a separate school in Japan until the 12th century when Eisai traveled to China and returned to establish a Linji lineage, which is known in Japan as the Rinzai. In 1215, Dōgen, a younger contemporary of Eisai's, journeyed to China himself, where he became a disciple of the Caodong master Rujing. After his return, Dōgen established the Sōtō school, the Japanese branch of Caodong.

The schools of Zen that currently exist in Japan are the Sōtō, Rinzai and Ōbaku. Of these, Sōtō is the largest and Ōbaku the smallest. Rinzai is itself divided into several subschools based on temple affiliation, including Myōshin-ji, Nanzen-ji, Tenryū-ji, Daitoku-ji, and Tōfuku-ji.

=== Chan in Indonesia ===
In the 20th century, during the First Buddhist revival, missionaries were sent to Indonesia and Malaysia. Ashin Jinarakkhita, who played a central role in the revival of Indonesian Buddhism, received ordination as a Chan śrāmaṇera on July 29, 1953 and received the name Ti Zheng (Te Cheng) from bhikṣu Ben Qing.

== Chan in the Western world ==
Chan has become especially popular in its Japanese form. Although it is difficult to trace when the West first became aware of Chan as a distinct form of Buddhism, the visit of Soyen Shaku, a Japanese Zen monk, to Chicago during the 1893 Parliament of the World's Religions is often pointed to as an event that enhanced its profile in the Western world. It was during the late 1950s and the early 1960s that the number of Westerners pursuing a serious interest in Zen, other than the descendants of Asian immigrants, reached a significant level.

=== Western Chan lineages ===
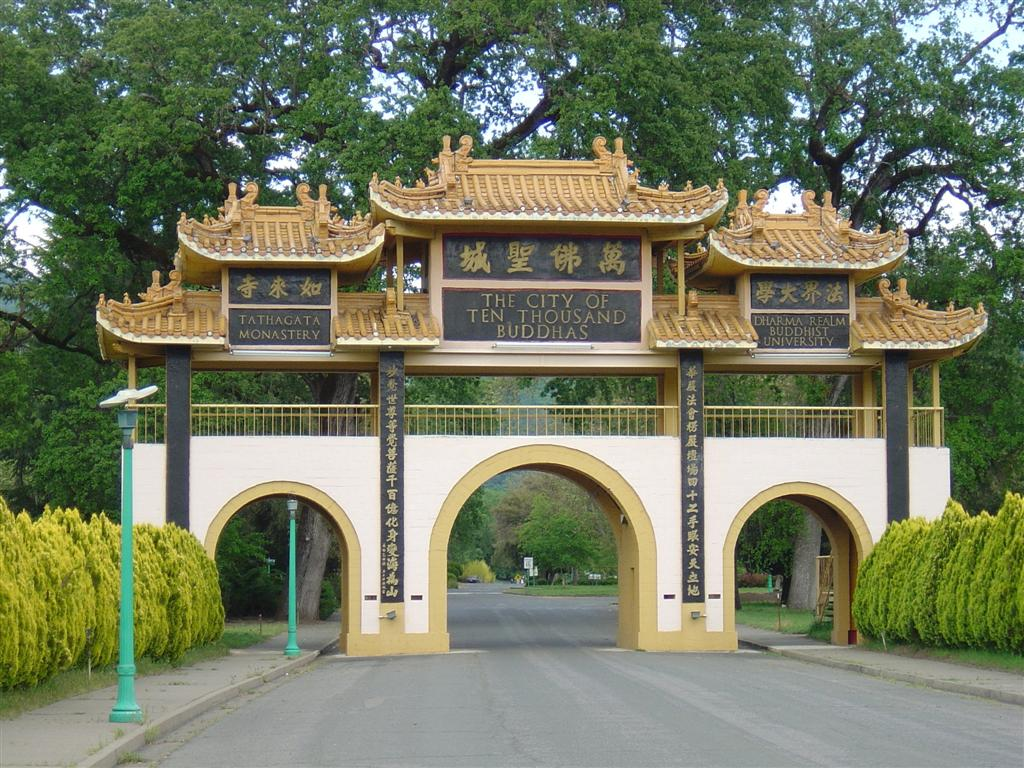
Covering over 480 acres of land and located in Talmage, California, the City of Ten Thousand Buddhas was founded by Hsuan Hua.

The first Chinese master to teach Westerners in North America was Hsuan Hua, who taught Chan and other traditions of Chinese Buddhism in San Francisco during the early 1960s. He went on to found the City Of Ten Thousand Buddhas, a monastery and retreat center located on a 237-acre (959,000 m^{2}) property near Ukiah, California, and thus founding the Dharma Realm Buddhist Association and the Dharma Realm Buddhist University. Another Chinese Chan teacher with a Western following was Sheng Yen, a master trained in both the Caodong and Linji schools. He first visited the United States in 1978 under the sponsorship of the Buddhist Association of the United States, and subsequently founded the CMC Chan Meditation Center in Queens, New York and the Dharma Drum Retreat Center in Pine Bush, New York. (Note: Dharma Drum Mountain. Who Is Master Sheng-yen.)

== Doctrinal background ==
Though Chan narrative states that it is a "special transmission outside scriptures" which "did not stand upon words", Chan does have a rich doctrinal background.

=== Polarities ===
Classical Chinese Chan is characterised by a set of polarities: absolute-relative, Buddha-nature – sunyata, sudden and gradual enlightenment, esoteric and exoteric transmission.

==== Absolute-relative ====
The Prajnaparamita sutras and Madhyamaka emphasize the non-duality of form and emptiness: "form is emptiness, emptiness is form", as the Heart sutra says. This was understood to mean that ultimate reality is not a transcendental realm, but equal to the daily world of relative reality. This idea is consistent with Chinese culture, which emphasized the mundane world and society. But this does not fully explain how the absolute is present in the relative world. This question is answered in such schemata as the Five Ranks of Dongshan, the Ten Bulls ("the Oxherding Pictures"), and Hakuin's Four ways of knowing.

The Madhyamaka two truths doctrine and the Yogacara three natures and Trikaya doctrines also give depictions of the interplay between the absolute and the relative.

==== Buddha-nature and śūnyatā ====
When Buddhism was introduced in China it was understood in native terms. Various traditions struggled to attain an understanding of the Indian texts. The Tathāgatagarbha sūtras and the idea of the Buddha-nature were endorsed because of the perceived similarities with the Tao, which was understood as a transcendental reality underlying the world of appearances. Śūnyatā at first was understood as pointing to the Taoist wu.

The doctrine of the Buddha-nature asserts that all sentient beings have Buddha-nature (Skt. Buddhadhātu, "Buddha Element", "Buddha-Principle"), the element from which awakening springs. The Tathāgatagarbha sutras state that every living being has the potential to realize awakening. Hence Buddhism offers salvation to everyone, not only to monks or those who have freed themselves almost completely from karma in previous lives. The Yogacara theory of the Eight Consciousnesses explains how sensory input and the mind create the world we experience, and obscure the alaya-jnana, which is equated to the Buddha-nature.

When this potential is realized, and the defilements have been eliminated, the Buddha-nature manifests as the Dharmakaya, the absolute reality which pervades everything in the world. In this way, it is also the primordial reality from which phenomenal reality springs. When this understanding is idealized, it becomes a transcendental reality beneath the world of appearances.

Sunyata points to the "emptiness" or no-"thing"-ness of all "things". Though we perceive a world of concrete and discrete objects, designated by names, on close analysis the "thingness" dissolves, leaving them "empty" of inherent existence. The Heart sutra, a text from the prajñaparamita sutras, articulates this in the following saying in which the five skandhas are said to be "empty":

Yogacara explains this "emptiness" in an analysis of the way we perceive "things". Everything we conceive of is the result of the working of the five skandhas—results of perception, feeling, volition, and discrimination. (Note: Translations do differ, which makes a difference. Vijñāna can be translated as "consciousness", but also as "discernment".) The five skandhas together compose consciousness. The "things" we are conscious of are "mere concepts", not noumenon.

It took Chinese Buddhism several centuries to recognize that śūnyatā is not identical to "wu", nor does Buddhism postulate a permanent soul. The influence of those various doctrinal and textual backgrounds is still discernible in Zen. Zen teachers still refer to Buddha-nature, but the Zen tradition also emphasizes that Buddha-nature is śūnyatā, the absence of an independent and substantial self.

==== Sudden and gradual enlightenment ====
Painting of Shakyamuni Buddha sitting in meditation and remaining unmoved, while Buddhist disciples are grouped around a dragon, composed at its appearance. Ming dynasty (1368–1644), China.

In Chan Buddhism two main views on the way to enlightenment are discernible, namely sudden and gradual enlightenment.

Early Chan recognized the "transcendence of the body and mind", followed by "non-defilement [of] knowledge and perception", or sudden insight into the true nature (jianxing) followed by gradual purification of intentions.

In the 8th century, Chan history was effectively refashioned by Shenhui, who created a dichotomy between the so-called East Mountain Teaching or "Northern School", led by Yuquan Shenxiu, and his own line of teaching, which he called the "Southern school". Shenhui placed Huineng into prominence as the sixth Chan-patriarch, and emphasized sudden enlightenment, as opposed to the concurrent Northern School's alleged gradual enlightenment. According to the sudden enlightenment propagated by Shenhui, insight into true nature is sudden; thereafter there can be no misunderstanding anymore about this true nature.

In the Platform Sutra, the dichotomy between sudden and gradual is reconciled. Guifeng Zongmi, fifth-generation successor to Shenhui, also softened the edge between sudden and gradual. In his analysis, sudden awakening points to seeing into one's true nature, but is to be followed by a gradual cultivation to attain Buddhahood.

This gradual cultivation is also recognized by Dongshan Liangjie (Japanese Tōzan), who described the five ranks of enlightenment.

==== Esoteric and exoteric transmission ====
According to Borup the emphasis on 'mind to mind transmission' is a form of esoteric transmission, in which "the tradition and the enlightened mind is transmitted face to face". Metaphorically this can be described as the transmission from a flame from one candle to another candle, or the transmission from one vein to another. Exoteric transmission requires "direct access to the teaching through a personal discovery of one's self. This type of transmission and identification is symbolized by the discovery of a shining lantern, or a mirror."

While Chan tradition generally stresses the importance of transmission, there have also been examples of Chan masters who never received dharma transmission and did not belong to any formal lineage, such as Hanshan Deqing, Zibo Zhenke, and Yunqi Zhuhong. Such masters were said to have acquired "wisdom without teachers."

=== Chan scripture ===
Chan is deeply rooted in the teachings and doctrines of Mahāyāna Buddhism. What the Chan tradition emphasizes is that the enlightenment of the Buddha came not through intellectual reasoning, but rather through self-realization in Dharma practice and meditation. Therefore, it is held that it is primarily through Dharma practice and meditation that others may attain enlightenment and become Buddhas as well.

A review of the early historical documents and literature of early Chan masters clearly reveals that they were all well-versed in numerous Mahāyāna Buddhist sūtras. For example, in the Platform Sūtra of the Sixth Patriarch, Huineng cites and explains the Diamond Sūtra, the Lotus Sūtra (Saddharma Puṇḍarika Sūtra), the Vimalakirti Nirdeśa Sūtra, the Śūraṅgama Sūtra, and the Laṅkāvatāra Sūtra.

The Chan school had to develop a doctrinal tradition of its own to establish its position. Subsequently, the Chan tradition produced a rich corpus of written literature which has become a part of its practice and teaching. Among the earliest and most widely studied of the specifically Chan texts, dating to at least the 9th century CE, is the Platform Sūtra of the Sixth Patriarch, attributed to Huineng. The most important Chan texts belong to the "encounter dialogue" genre, which developed into various collections of gong'ans.

== Teaching and practice ==
=== Bodhisattva ideal ===
As a school of Mahāyāna Buddhism, Chan draws many of its basic driving concepts from that tradition, such as the Bodhisattva ideal. Karuṇā is the counterpart of prajna. The Bodhisattva Avalokiteśvara (Guanyin) embodies the striving for Karuṇā, compassion. (Note: Lathouwers 2000:221 mentions: Blofeld, John (1988), Bodhisattva of compassion - the mystical tradition of kuan Yin. Boston: Shanbhala) As a form of Mahayana Buddhism, Chan is grounded on the schema of the Bodhisattva path, which is based on the practice of the "transcendent virtues" or "perfections" (Skt. pāramitā, Ch. boluomi) as well as the taking of the Bodhisattva vows. The most widely used list of six virtues is: generosity, moral training (incl. five precepts), patient endurance, energy or effort, meditation (dhyana), wisdom. An important source for these teachings is the Avatamsaka Sutra, which also outlines the grounds (bhumis) or levels of the Bodhisattva path. The pāramitās are mentioned in early Chan works such as Bodhidharma's Two Entrances and Four Practices and are seen as an important part of gradual cultivation (jianxiu) by later Chan figures like Zongmi.

An important element of this practice is the formal and ceremonial taking of refuge in the three jewels, bodhisattva vows and precepts. Various sets of precepts are taken in Chan including the five precepts, "ten essential precepts", and the sixteen bodhisattva precepts. This is commonly done in an initiation ritual (受戒, Ch. shoujie, lit: "receiving the precepts"), which is also undertaken by lay followers and marks a layperson as a formal Buddhist.

The Chinese Buddhist practice of fasting (zhai), especially during the uposatha days (Ch. zhairi, "days of fasting") can also be an element of Chan training. Chan masters may go on extended absolute fasts, as exemplified by master Hsuan Hua's 35 day fast, which he undertook during the Cuban Missile Crisis for the generation of merit.

=== Chan meditation ===
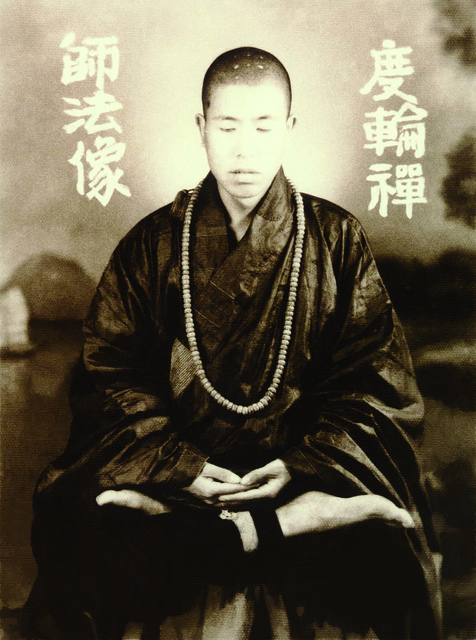
Venerable Hsuan Hua meditating in the lotus position, Hong Kong, 1953

Central to Chan practice is dhyana or meditation. In the Linji school this is supplemented with gong'an study. In meditation practice, the Chan tradition holds that the very notions of doctrine and teachings create various other notions and appearances (Skt. saṃjñā; Ch. 相, xiāng) that obscure the transcendent wisdom of each being's Buddha-nature. Thus, Chan encourages its practitioners to distrust the very scripture or text being taught to them. The process of rediscovery goes under various terms such as "introspection", "a backward step", "turning-about" or "turning the eye inward".

The practice of Buddhist meditation originated in India and first entered China through the translations of An Shigao (fl. c. 148–180 CE), and Kumārajīva (334–413 CE). Both of these figures translated various Dhyāna sutras. These were influential meditation texts which were mostly based on the meditation teachings of the Kashmiri Sarvāstivāda school (circa 1st–4th centuries CE). Among the most influential early Chinese meditation texts are the Anban Shouyi Jing (安般守意經, Sutra on ānāpānasmṛti), the Zuochan Sanmei Jing (坐禪三昧經, Sutra of sitting dhyānasamādhi) and the Damoduoluo Chan Jing (達摩多羅禪經, Dharmatrata dhyāna sutra). Early Chan texts also teach forms of meditation that are unique to Mahāyāna Buddhism. For example, the Treatise on the Essentials of Cultivating the Mind, which depicts the teachings of the 7th-century East Mountain school, teaches a visualization of a sun disk, similar to that taught in the Contemplation Sutra. According to Charles Luk, there was no single fixed method in early Chan. All the various Buddhist meditation methods were simply skillful means that could lead a meditator to the Buddha-mind within.

While dhyāna in a strict sense refers to the classic four dhyānas, in Chinese Buddhism, Chan may refer to various kinds of meditation techniques and their preparatory practices, which are necessary to practice dhyāna. The five main types of meditation in the Dhyāna sutras are ānāpānasmṛti (mindfulness of breathing); paṭikūlamanasikāra meditation (mindfulness of the impurities of the body); maitrī meditation (loving-kindness); the contemplation on the twelve links of pratītyasamutpāda; and contemplation on the Buddha. According to the modern Chan master Sheng Yen, these practices are termed the "five methods for stilling or pacifying the mind" and serve to focus and purify the mind, and support the development of the stages of dhyana. Chan Buddhists may also use other classic Buddhist practices like the four foundations of mindfulness and the Three Gates of Liberation (emptiness or śūnyatā, signlessness or animitta, and wishlessness or apraṇihita).

==== Chan's sudden approach ====
Modern scholars like Robert Sharf argue that early Chan, while having unique teachings and myths, also made use of classic Buddhist meditation methods, and this is why it is hard to find many uniquely "Chan" meditation instructions in some of the earliest sources. However, Sharf also notes there was a unique kind of Chan meditation taught in some early sources which also tend to deprecate the traditional Buddhist meditations. This uniquely Chan approach goes by various names like "maintaining mind" (shouxin 守心), "maintaining unity" (shouyi 守一), "discerning the mind" (guanxin 觀心), "viewing the mind" (kanxin 看心), and "pacifying the mind" (anxin 安心). (Note: An early Chan critique of the notion of "pacifying the mind" can be found in the Oxhead School text, the Jueguan lun: "What is the mind? What is it to pacify the mind (an-hsin 安心)?" [The master] answered: "You should not posit a mind, nor should you attempt to pacify it—this may be called 'pacified.'") A traditional phrase that describes this practice states that "Chan points directly to the human mind, to enable people to see their true nature and become Buddhas."

Chan sources use the term "tracing back the radiance" or "turning one's light around" (Ch. fǎn zhào, 返照) to describe seeing the inherent radiant source of the mind itself, the "numinous awareness", luminosity, or Buddha-nature. The Platform Sutra mentions this term and connects it with seeing one's "original face". The Record of Linji states that all that is needed to obtain the Dharma is to "turn your own light in upon yourselves and never seek elsewhere". Sharf also notes that the early notion of contemplating a pure Buddha "Mind" was tempered and balanced by other Chan sources with terms like "no-mind" (wuxin), and "no-mindfulness" (wunian), to avoid any metaphysical reification of mind, and any clinging to mind or language. This kind of negative Madhyamaka style dialectic is found in early Chan sources like the Treatise on No Mind (Wuxin lun 無心論) of the Oxhead School and the Platform Sutra. These sources tend to emphasize emptiness, negation, and absence (wusuo 無所) as the main theme of contemplation. These two contemplative themes (the Buddha mind and no-mind, positive and negative rhetoric) continued to shape the development of Chan theory and practice throughout its history.

According to McRae the "first explicit statement of the sudden and direct approach that was to become the hallmark of Ch'an religious practice" is associated with the East Mountain School. It is a method named "maintaining the one without wavering" (守一不移, shǒu yī bù yí), the one being the true nature of mind or Suchness, which is equated with Buddha-nature. (Note: Sharf observes that "maintaining the one" or "guarding the one" (shou yi, 守一) fell out of favor with the eclipse of the Northern School. Evidence of this can be seen in the Xinxin Ming, for example: "If there is even a trace of 'is' or 'is not,' the mind will be lost in confusion. Although the two comes from the One, do not guard even this One." Other sources explicitly reject the notion of "maintaining" or "preserving" (shou 守). See for example the Xin Ming (not to be confused with the Xinxin Ming): "Bodhi exists originally It has no need of being preserved Afflictions have no intrinsic existence They do not need to be eradicated Numinous knowing is self-illuminated The myriad dharmas return to Thusness There is no return, no receiving Cut off contemplation, forget preservation") Sharf writes that in this practice, one turns the attention from the objects of experience to "the nature of conscious awareness itself", the innately pure Buddha-nature, which was compared to a clear mirror or to the sun (which is always shining but may be covered by clouds). This type of meditation is based on classic Mahāyāna ideas which are not uniquely "Chan", but according to McRae it differs from traditional practice in that "no preparatory requirements, no moral prerequisites or preliminary exercises are given," and is "without steps or gradations. One concentrates, understands, and is enlightened, all in one undifferentiated practice." (Note: It first appears in a Chinese text named the Ju-tao an-hsin yao-fang-pien fa-men (JTFM, Instructions on essential expedients for calming the mind and accessing the path), itself a part of the Leng Ch'ieh Shih Tzu Chi (Records of the Masters of the Lankavatara). The Records of the Masters of the Lankavatara is associated with the early Chan tradition known as the "East Mountain School" and has been dated to around 713.)

Later Chinese Chan Buddhists developed their own meditation ("chan") manuals which taught their unique method of direct and sudden contemplation. The earliest of these is the widely imitated and influential Zuochan Yí (c. turn of the 12th century), which recommends a simple contemplative practice that is said to lead to the discovery of inherent wisdom already present in the mind. This work also shows the influence of the earlier meditation manuals composed by Tiantai patriarch Zhiyi. However, other Chan sources de-emphasize traditional practices like sitting meditation, and instead focus on effortlessness and on ordinary daily activities. One example of this is found in the Record of Linji which states: "Followers of the Way, as to Buddhadharma, no effort is necessary. You have only to be ordinary, with nothing to do—defecating, urinating, wearing clothes, eating food, and lying down when tired." Having no concerns or nothing-to-do (wushi 無事) also appears in other Chan sources as well. For example, Chan master Huangbo states that nothing compares with non-seeking, describing the Chan adept as follows: "the person of the Way is the one who has nothing to do [wu-shih], who has no mind at all and no doctrine to preach. Having nothing to do, such a person lives at ease."

John McRae notes that a major development in early Chan was the rejection of traditional meditation techniques in favor of a uniquely Chan direct approach. Early Chan sources like the Long Scroll (dubbed the Bodhidharma Anthology by Jeffrey Broughton), (Note: The original title of the Long Scroll, the earliest extant Chan text, is unknown. Although it has been called the Long Scroll of the Treatise on the Two Entrances and Four Practices, John Jorgensen writes in his thesis on this text, "I have titled it the Long Scroll rather than the Erh-ju ssu-hsing lun [Treatise on the Two Entrances and Four Practices] or Ta-mo lun because these latter titles are confusing and ill-defined.") the Platform Sutra and the works of Shenhui question such things as mindfulness and concentration, and instead state that insight can be attained directly and suddenly. For example, Record I of the Long Scroll states: "The man of sharp abilities hears of the path without producing a covetous mind. He does not even produce right mindfulness and right reflection," and the iconoclastic Master Yüan states in Record III of the same text, "If mind is not produced, what need is there for cross-legged sitting dhyana?" Similarly, the Platform Sutra criticizes the practice of sitting samādhi: "One is enlightened to the Way through the mind. How could it depend on sitting?", while Shenhui's four pronouncements criticize the "freezing", "stopping", "activating", and "concentrating" of the mind.

Chan sources that focus on the sudden teaching can sometimes be quite radical in their rejection of the importance of traditional Buddhist ideas and practices. The Record of the Dharma-Jewel Through the Ages (Lidai Fabao Ji) for example states "better that one should destroy śīla [ethics], and not destroy true seeing. Śīla [causes] rebirth in Heaven, adding more [karmic] bonds, while true seeing attains nirvāṇa." Similarly the Bloodstream Sermon states that it doesn't matter whether one is a butcher or not, if one sees one's true nature, then one will not be affected by karma. The Bloodstream Sermon also rejects the worship of Buddhas and bodhisattvas, stating that "Those who hold onto appearances are devils. They fall from the Path. Why worship illusions born of the mind? Those who worship don't know, and those who know don't worship." Similarly, in the Lidai Fabao Ji, Wuzhu states that "No-thought is none other than seeing the Buddha" and rejects the practice of worship and recitation. Most famously, the Record of Linji has the master state that "if you meet a Buddha, kill the Buddha" (as well as patriarchs, arhats, parents, and kinfolk), further claiming that through this "you will gain emancipation, will not be entangled with things."

==== Sitting meditation ====
Sitting meditation is called zuochan (坐禅), zazen in Japanese, both simply meaning "sitting dhyāna". During this sitting meditation, practitioners usually assume a position such as the lotus position, half-lotus, Burmese, or seiza postures. To regulate the mind, awareness is directed towards counting or watching the breath, or put in the energy center below the navel (see also anapanasati). Often, a square or round cushion placed on a padded mat is used to sit on; in some other cases, a chair may be used.

At the beginning of the Song dynasty, practice with the gong'an method became popular, whereas others practiced "silent illumination." This became the source of some differences in practice between the Linji and Caodong traditions.

==== Silent illumination ====
A common form of sitting meditation is called "Silent illumination" (Ch. mòzhào 默照, Jp. mokushō). This practice was traditionally promoted by the Caodong school of Chinese Chan and is associated with Hongzhi Zhengjue (1091–1157) who wrote various works on the practice. This method derives from the Indian Buddhist practice of the union (Skt. yuganaddha) of śamatha and vipaśyanā.

Hongzhi's practice of silent illumination does not depend on concentration on particular objects, "such as visual images, sounds, breathing, concepts, stories, or deities." Instead, it is a non-dual "objectless" meditation, involving "withdrawal from exclusive focus on a particular sensory or mental object." This practice allows the meditator to be aware of "all phenomena as a unified totality," without any conceptualizing, grasping, goal seeking, or subject-object duality. According to Leighton, this method "rests on the faith, verified in experience, that the field of vast brightness is ours from the outset." This "vast luminous Buddha field" is our immanent "inalienable endowment of wisdom" which cannot be cultivated or enhanced. Instead, one just has to recognize this radiant clarity without any interference.

==== Nianfo Chan ====
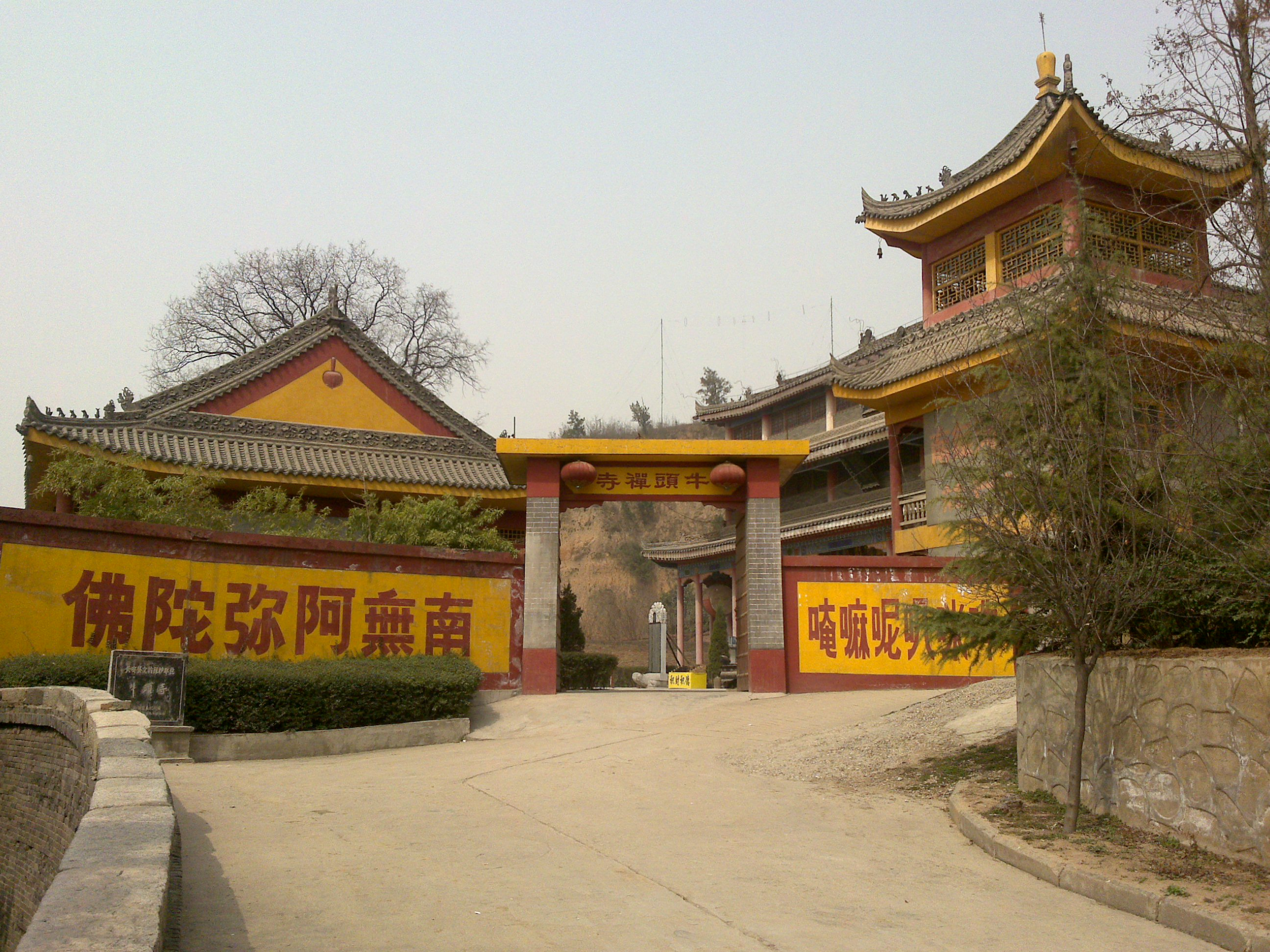
The phrase Namo Amituofo written on the left of the gate of Niutou Chan Temple (牛頭禪寺) in Xi'an in Shaanxi, China.

Nianfo (Jrom Skt. buddhānusmṛti "recollection of the Buddha") refers to the recitation of the Buddha's name, in most cases the Buddha Amitabha. In Chinese Chan, the Pure Land practice of nianfo based on the phrase Namo Amituofo (I take refuge in Amitabha) is a widely practiced form of Chan meditation which came to be known as "Nianfo Chan" (念佛禪). Nianfo was practiced and taught by early Chan masters, like Daoxin (580–651), who taught that one should "bind the mind to one Buddha and exclusively invoke his name". The practice is also taught in Shenxiu's Guanxin lun (觀心論). Likewise, the Chuan fabao qi (傳法寶紀, Taisho # 2838, ca. 713), one of the earliest Chan histories, shows this practice was widespread in the early Chan generation of Hongren, Faru and Dadong who are said to have "invoked the name of the Buddha so as to purify the mind."

Evidence for the practice of Nianfo Chan can also be found in Changlu Zongze's (died c. 1107) Chanyuan qinggui (The Rules of Purity in the Chan Monastery), perhaps the most influential Chan monastic code in East Asia. Nianfo continued to be taught as a form of Chan meditation by later Chinese figures such as Yongming Yanshou, Zhongfen Mingben, and Tianru Weize. During the late Ming, the tradition of Nianfo Chan meditation was continued by figures such as Yunqi Zhuhong and Hanshan Deqing. Chan figures like Yongming Yanshou generally advocated a view called "mind-only Pure Land" (wei-hsin ching-t’u), which held that the Buddha and the Pure Land are just mind.

==== Huatou and Gong'an Contemplation ====
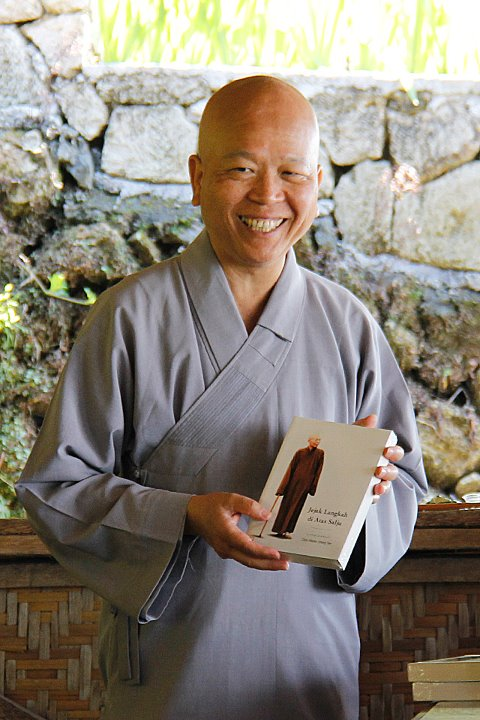
Chan master Guo Yuan, a disciple of Sheng-yen, at the end of a Chan Buddhist huatou retreat in Central Java, Indonesia.

A gong'an (literally "public case", Jp: koan) is a story or dialogue, generally related to Chan or other Buddhist histories; the most typical form is an anecdote involving early Chinese Chan masters. These anecdotes involving famous Chan teachers are a practical demonstration of their wisdom, and can be used to test a student's progress in Chan practice. Gong'an often appear to be paradoxical or linguistically meaningless dialogues or questions. But to Chan Buddhists, the gong'an is "the place and the time and the event where truth reveals itself" unobstructed by the oppositions and differentiation of language. Answering a gong'an requires a student to let go of conceptual thinking and of the logical way we order the world, so that, like creativity in art, the appropriate insight and response arises naturally and spontaneously in the mind.

During the Song dynasty, gong'an literature became popular. Literally meaning "public case", they were stories or dialogues describing teachings and interactions between Chan masters and their students. Gong'an are meant to illustrate Chan's non-conceptual insight (prajña). During the Song, a new meditation method was developed by Linji school figures such as Dahui (1089–1163) called kanhua chan ("observing the phrase" meditation) which referred to contemplation on a single word or phrase (called the huatou, "critical phrase") of a gong'an. Dahui famously criticised Caodong's "silent illumination." While the two methods of Caodong and Linji are sometimes seen as competing with each other, Schlütter writes that Dahui himself "did not completely condemn quiet-sitting; in fact, he seems to have recommended it, at least to his monastic disciples."

In Chan, the practice of "observing the huatou" is still a widely practiced method. Some contemporary figures that have taught this technique include influential Chinese masters like Sheng Yen and Xuyun.

=== Chanting and rituals ===
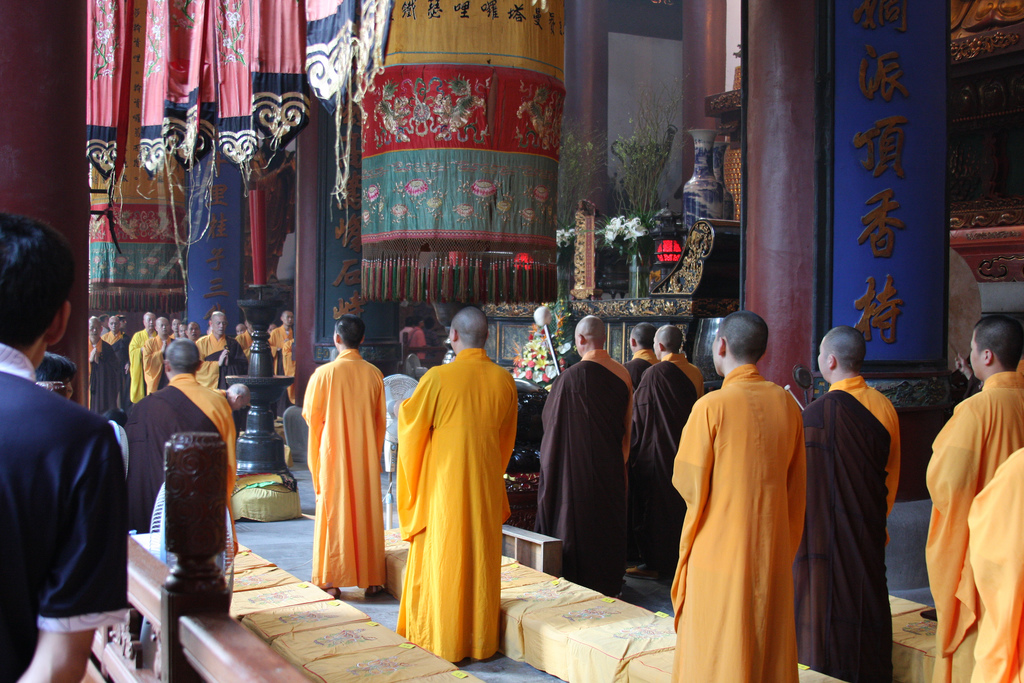
Chinese Buddhist monks performing a formal ceremony in Hangzhou, Zhejiang, China.

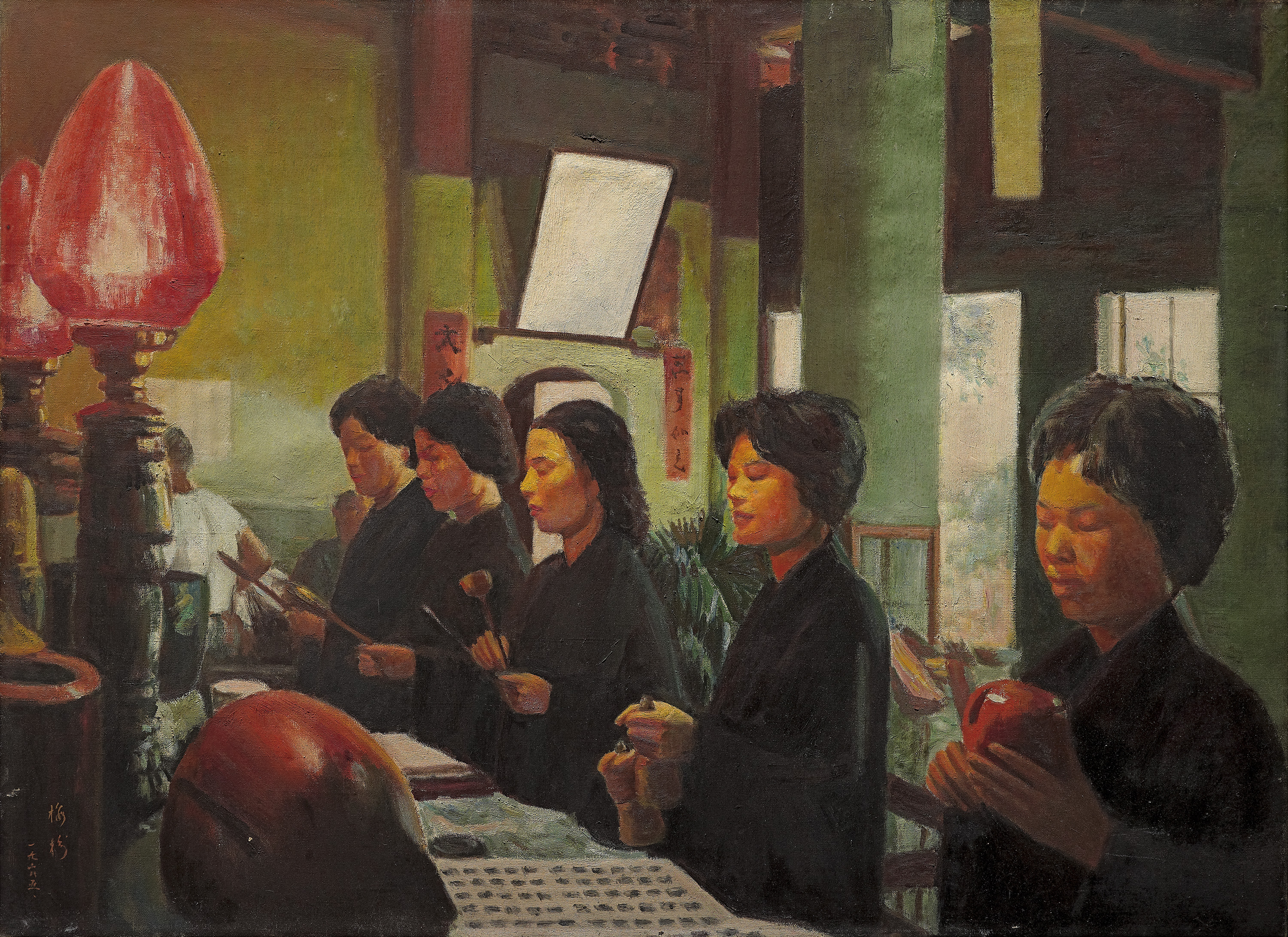
Chanting the Buddhist Scriptures, by Taiwanese painter Li Mei-shu

Most Chan monasteries, temples and centers perform various rituals, services and ceremonies (such as initiation ceremonies and funerals), which are always accompanied by the chanting of verses, poems or sutras. The style of chanting typically used in Chan Buddhist practice is called fanbai, which is traditionally orally transmitted through a lineage of monastics. It is also usually accompanied by music performed using special Buddhist instruments such a sthe gong, the muyu (木魚, wooden fish), the qing (磬, sounding stones), the gu (鼓, drums), zhong (鐘, bells) and chazi (镲仔, cymbals). There are also ceremonies that are specifically for the purpose of sutra recitation (Ch. niansong) itself. Some major Mahayana sutras that are popularly chanted include the Heart Sutra, chapter 25 of the Lotus Sutra (often called the "Avalokiteśvara Sutra"), the Amitābha Sūtra and the Ksitigarbha Pūrvapraṇidhāna Sūtra. Dhāraṇīs and mantras are also found in various Chan liturgies, including texts like the Nīlakaṇṭha Dhāraṇī, the Uṣṇīṣa Vijaya Dhāraṇī, the Śūraṅgama Mantra and the Ten Small Mantras. Most Chan monasteries follow a traditional standardized liturgical structure for their daily morning and evening chants, which include many of the above-mentioned texts along with other verses of taking refuge, praise, repentance and the feeding of hungry ghosts.

Chan temples also usually hold various types of rituals throughout the calendar year. One important type of ritual practiced in Chan are various repentance or confession rituals (懺悔, Chanhui) that are also widely practiced in all other forms of Chinese Mahayana Buddhism. Some popular examples of such a ritual in Chan Buddhism is the Dabei Chan, composed by the Tiantai Patriarch Siming Zhili, and the Yaoshi Bao Chan, which is traditionally ascribed to the Nanshan Vinaya master Jianyue Duti and edited by the Tiantai monk Shou Deng. A widely practiced ritual in Chinese Chan is the tantric Yujia Yankou rite that is practiced with the aim of facilitating the spiritual nourishment of all sentient beings. The Chinese holiday of the Ghost Festival might also be celebrated with similar rituals for the dead.

=== Esoteric practices ===
Depending on the tradition, esoteric methods such as mantra and dhāraṇī may also be used for different purposes including meditation practice, protection from evil, invoking great compassion, invoking the power of certain bodhisattvas, and are chanted during ceremonies and rituals. The Heart Sutra Mantra is also another mantra that is used in Chan during various rituals.

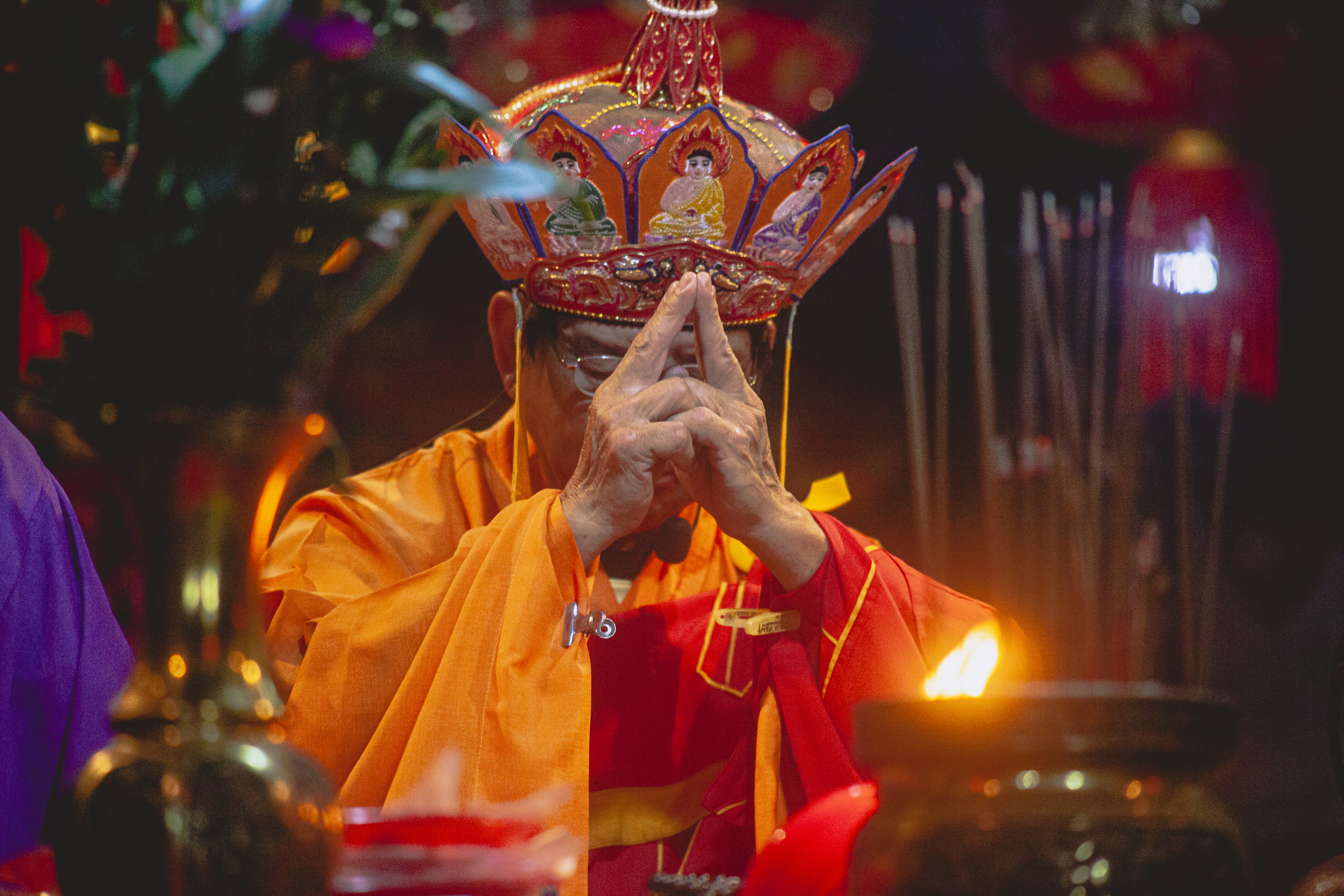
A Chinese monk taking on the role of a tantric vajrācārya during a Yujia Yankou ritual

In Chan, the usage of esoteric mantras goes back to the Tang dynasty. There is evidence that Chan Buddhists adopted practices from Chinese Esoteric Buddhism in findings from Dunhuang. According to Henrik Sørensen, several successors of Shenxiu (such as Jingxian and Yixing) were also students of the Zhenyan (Mantra) school. Influential esoteric dhāraṇī, such as the Uṣṇīṣa Vijaya Dhāraṇī Sūtra and the Nīlakaṇṭha Dhāraṇī, also begin to be cited in the literature of the Baotang school during the Tang dynasty. The eighth century Chan monks of Shaolin temple also performed esoteric practices such as mantras and dharanis. Many mantras have been preserved since the Tang period and continue to be practiced in modern monasteries. One common example is the Śūraṅgama Mantra, which is commonly chanted by monastics as part of the morning liturgy (朝誦 Chaosong) and evening liturgy (暮誦 Musong) in temples. Various rituals that continue to be practiced by Chan monastics, such as the tantric Yujia Yankou rite and the extensive Shuilu Fahui ceremony, also involve esoteric aspects, including maṇḍala offerings and the invocation of esoteric deities such as the Five Wisdom Buddhas and the Ten Wisdom Kings.

=== Chan monasticism ===
==== Emphasizing daily life ====
As the Chan school grew in China, the monastic discipline also became distinct, focusing on practice through all aspects of life. Temples began emphasizing labor and humility, expanding the training of Chan to include the mundane tasks of daily life. The Chinese Chan master Baizhang (720–814 CE) left behind a famous saying which had been the guiding principle of his life, "A day without work is a day without food". (Note: "Digital Dictionary of Buddhism", entry "Baizhang Huaihai".)

==== Sinification of Buddhism in China ====
It was scholar D.T. Suzuki's contention that a spiritual awakening was always the goal of Chan's training, but that part of what distinguished the tradition as it developed through the centuries in China was a way of life radically different from that of Indian Buddhists. In Indian Buddhism, the tradition of the mendicant prevailed, but Suzuki explained that in China social circumstances led to the development of a temple and training-center system in which the abbot and the monks all performed mundane tasks. These included food gardening or farming, carpentry, architecture, housekeeping, administration (or community direction), and the practice of Traditional Chinese medicine. Consequently, the enlightenment sought in Chan had to stand up well to the demands and potential frustrations of everyday life.

== See also ==
- Blue Cliff Record
- Hua Tou
- Buddhism
- Outline of Buddhism
- Timeline of Buddhism
- List of Buddhists
- Chinese Buddhism
- Japanese Zen
- Yiduan
- Putong Temple

== Sources ==
=== Printed sources ===
- Blyth, R. H. (1966), Zen and Zen Classics, Volume 4, Tokyo: Hokuseido Press
- Borup, Jørn (2008), Japanese Rinzai Zen Buddhism: Myōshinji, a Living Religion, Brill
- Broughton, Jeffrey L. (1999), The Bodhidharma Anthology: The Earliest Records of Zen, Berkeley, CA: University of California Press, ISBN 978-0-520-21972-4
- Brown Holt, Linda (1995), "From India to China: Transformations in Buddhist Philosophy", Qi: The Journal of Traditional Eastern Health & Fitness
- Buswell, Robert E. (1991), "The "Short-cut" Approach of K'an-hua Meditation: The Evolution of a Practical Subitism in Chinese Ch'an Buddhism", in Peter N. Gregory (ed.), Sudden and Gradual. Approaches to Enlightenment in Chinese Thought, Delhi: Motilal Banarsidass Publishers Private Limited
- Buswell, Robert E (1993), Ch'an Hermeneutics: A Korean View. In: Donald S. Lopez, Jr. (ed.)(1993), Buddhist Hermeneutics, Delhi: Motilal Banarsidass
- Chang, Chung-Yuan (1967). "Ch'an Buddhism: Logical and Illogical". Philosophy East and West. 17 (1/4): 37–49. doi:10.2307/1397043. JSTOR 1397043. Archived from the original on 2011-05-24.
- Cheng Chien Bhikshu (1992), "Introduction", Sun-Face Buddha. The Teachings of Ma-tsu and the Hung-chou School of Ch'an, Asian Humanities Press
- Cleary, Thomas (2005), Classics of Buddhism and Zen: Volume One, Boston, MA: Shambhala publications, ISBN 978-1-57062-831-3
- Dumoulin, Heinrich (2005a), Zen Buddhism: A History. Volume 1: India and China, World Wisdom Books, ISBN 978-0-941532-89-1
- Dumoulin, Heinrich (2005b), Zen Buddhism: A History. Volume 2: Japan, World Wisdom Books, ISBN 978-0-941532-90-7
- Dumoulin, Heinrich; Heisig, James W.; Knitter, Paul (2005). Zen Buddhism: A History (India and China). World Wisdom. ISBN 0-941532-89-5.
- Faure, Bernard (1997), The Will to Orthodoxy: A Critical Genealogy of Northern Chan Buddhism, Stanford University Press
- Faure, Bernard (2000), Visions of Power. Imaging Medieval Japanese Buddhism, Princeton, New Jersey: Princeton University Press
- Ferguson, Andy (2000), Zen's Chinese Heritage, Boston, MA: Wisdom Publications, ISBN 978-0-86171-163-5
- Feuchtwang, Stephen (2010), The Anthropology of Religion, Charisma and Ghosts: Chinese Lessons for Adequate Theory, Walter de Gruyter
- Fischer-Schreiber, Ingrid; Ehrhard, Franz-Karl; Diener, Michael S. (2008), Lexicon Boeddhisme. Wijsbegeerte, religie, psychologie, mystiek, cultuur en literatuur, Asoka
- Fowler, Merv (2005), Zen Buddhism: Beliefs and Practices, Sussex Academic Press
- Gimello, Robert M. (1994), "Marga and Culture: Learning, Letters, and Liberation in Northern Sung Ch'an.", in Buswell; Gimello (eds.), Paths to Liberation, Delhi: Motilal Banarsidass Publishers, pp. 475–505
- Goddard, Dwight (2007), History of Ch'an Buddhism previous to the times of Hui-neng (Wie-lang). In: A Buddhist Bible, Forgotten Books, ISBN 9781605061047
- Gregory, Peter N. (1991), "Sudden Enlightenment Followed by Gradual Cultivation: Tsung-mi's Analysis of mind", in Peter N. Gregory (ed.), Sudden and Gradual. Approaches to Enlightenment in Chinese Thought, Delhi: Motilal Banarsidass Publishers Private Limited
- Gregory, Peter N. (2002), Tsung-mi and the Sinification of Buddhism, University of Hawai’i Press, Kuroda Institute, (originally published Princeton University Press, 1991, Princeton, N.J.), ISBN 978-0-8248-2623-9
- Grigg, Ray (1999), The Ta of Zen, Edison, NJ: Alva Press
- Huaijin, Nan (1997), Basic Buddhism: exploring Buddhism and Zen, Samuel Weiser
- Heine, Steven; Wright, Dale S. (2000). The Koan: Texts and Contexts in Zen Buddhism. Oxford University Press. ISBN 0-19-511748-4.
- Heine, Steven (2008), Zen Skin, Zen Marrow
- Heine, Steven; Wright, Dale S., eds. (2008). Zen Ritual: Studies of Zen Buddhist Theory in Practice. USA: Oxford University Press.
- Hori, Victor Sogen. "Koan and Kensho in the Rinzai Zen Curriculum". In Heine & Wright (2000).
- Isshū, Miura; Sasaki, Ruth F. (1993), The Zen Koan, New York: Harcourt Brace & Company, ISBN 978-0-15-699981-6
- Jones, Charles B. (2010), "Review of Monks, Rulers and Literati: The Political Ascendancy of Chan Buddhism" (PDF), Journal of Buddhist Ethics
- Kalupahana, David J. (1992), The Principles of Buddhist Psychology, Delhi: ri Satguru Publications
- Kalupahana, David J. (1994), A history of Buddhist philosophy, Delhi: Motilal Banarsidass Publishers Private Limited
- Kasulis, Thomas P. (2003), Ch'an Spirituality. In: Buddhist Spirituality. Later China, Korea, Japan and the Modern World; edited by Takeuchi Yoshinori, Delhi: Motilal Banarsidass
- Lai, Whalen (1985), "Ma-Tsu Tao-I And The Unfolding Of Southern Zen", Japanese Journal of Religious Studies, 12 (2/3): 173–192, doi:10.18874/jjrs.12.2-3.1985.173-192
- Lai, Whalen (2003a), "Buddhism in China: A Historical Survey" ( (PDF)), in Cua, Antonio S. (ed.), Encyclopedia of Chinese Philosophy, New York: Routledge, archived from the original on November 12, 2014
- Lai, Hongyi Harry (2003b), The Religious Revival in China. In: Copenhagen Journal of Asian Studies 18
- Laliberte, Andre (2011), Buddhist Revival under State Watch, in: Journal of Current Chinese Affairs, 40, 2,107-134, archived from the original on 2019-12-25
- Lathouwers, Ton (2000), Meer dan een mens kan doen. Zentoespraken, Rotterdam: Asoka
- Leighton, Taigen Daniel (2000), Cultivating the Empty Field: The Silent Illumination of Zen Master Hongzhi, Tuttle Publishing, ISBN 978-0-8048-3240-3
- Liang-Chieh (1986), The Record of Tung-shan, Kuroda Institute (translator: William F. Powell)
- Lievens, Bavo (1981), Ma-tsu. De gesprekken, Bussum: Het Wereldvenster
- Low, Albert (2006), Hakuin on Kensho. The Four Ways of Knowing, Boston & London: Shambhala
- Maspero, Henri (1981), Taoism and Chinese Religion, University of Massachusetts Press, ISBN 978-0-87023-308-1
- McMahan, David L. (2008), The Making of Buddhist Modernism, Oxford University Press, ISBN 978-0-19-518327-6
- McRae, John (1986), The Northern School and the Formation of Early Chʻan Buddhism, University of Hawaii Press
- McRae, John (2003), Seeing Through Zen, The University Press Group Ltd
- McRae, John (2004), Seeing through Zen. Encounter, Transformation, and Genealogy in Chinese Chan Buddhism, University of California Press, ISBN 978-0-520-23798-8
- McRae, John (2008), The Platform Sutra of the Sixth Patriarch, translated from the Chinese of Zongbao (Taishō Volume 48, Number 2008) (PDF), archived from the original (PDF) on August 22, 2012
- Meng-Tat Chia, Jack (2011), "A Review of Enlightenment in Dispute: The Reinvention of Chan Buddhism in Seventeenth-Century China" (PDF), Journal of Buddhist Ethics, 18
- Meinert, Carman, ed. (2015), Transfer of Buddhism Across Central Asian Networks (7th to 13th Centuries), BRILL
- Nadeau, Randall L. (2012), The Wiley-Blackwell Companion to Chinese Religions, John Wiley & Sons
- Oh, Kang-nam (2000), "The Taoist Influence on Hua-yen Buddhism: A Case of the Scinicization of Buddhism in China", Chung-Hwa Buddhist Journal, 13
- Orzech, Charles D.; Sørensen, Henrik Hjort; Payne, Richard Karl (2011). Esoteric Buddhism and the Tantras in East Asia. Leiden: BRILL. ISBN 978-90-04-20401-0. OCLC 731667667.
- Sasaki, Ruth Fuller (2009), Kirchner, Thomas Yuho (ed.), The Record of Linji, Honolulu: University of Hawaii Press, ISBN 978-0824833190
- Schlütter, Morten (2008), How Zen became Zen. The Dispute over Enlightenment and the Formation of Chan Buddhism in Song-Dynasty China, Honolulu: University of Hawai'i Press, ISBN 978-0-8248-3508-8
- Sharf, Robert H. (2002a), "On Pure Land Buddhism and Ch'an/Pure Land Syncretism in Medieval China", T'oung Pao, 88 (4/5): 282–331, doi:10.1163/156853202100368398, ISSN 0082-5433, JSTOR 4528903
- Sharf, Robert (2002b). Coming to Terms with Chinese Buddhism, A Reading of the Treasure Store Treatise. University of Hawai'i Press.
- Sharf, Robert (October 2014), "Mindfullness and Mindlessness in Early Chan" (PDF), Philosophy East & West, 64 (4): 933–964, doi:10.1353/pew.2014.0074, S2CID 144208166
- Shimano, Eido T. (1991), Points of Departure: Zen Buddhism with a Rinzai View, Livingston Manor, NY: The Zen Studies Society Press, ISBN 978-0-9629246-0-6
- Shohaku Okumura (2012). Living by Vow: A Practical Introduction to Eight Essential Zen Chants and Texts. Simon and Schuster.
- Suzuki, D.T. (1935), Manual of Zen Buddhism
- Suzuki, D.T. (1955), Studies in Zen, New York: Delta
- Suzuki, D.T. (1970), Zen and Japanese Culture, New York: Bollingen/Princeton University Press, ISBN 978-0-691-09849-4
- Suzuki, D.T. (2004), The Training of the Zen Buddhist Monk, Tokyo: Cosimo, inc., ISBN 978-1-59605-041-9
- Swanson, Paul L. (1993), "The Spirituality of Emptiness in Early Chinese Buddhism", in Takeuchi Yoshinori (ed.), Buddhist Spirituality. Indian, Southeast Asian, Tibetan, Early Chinese, New York: Crossroad
- Torei (2010), The Undying Lamp of Zen. The Testament of Zen Master Torei, Boston & London: Shambhala (translator: Thomas Cleary)
- Verboven, Lucette (1992), Je kunt er niet uitvallen. Interview met Ton Lathouwers. In: Zen, jaargang 13, januari 1992, nummer 48
- Wang, Youru (2017). Historical Dictionary of Chan Buddhism. Rowman & Littlefield. ISBN 978-1-5381-0552-8. Archived from the original on 14 January 2023.
- Wayman, Alex; Wayman, Hideko (1990). The Lion's Roar of Queen Śrīmālā: A Buddhist Scripture on the Tathāgatagarbha Theory. Motilal Banarsidass. ISBN 9788120807310.
- Wegner, Michael (2001), Introduction to "Branching streams flow in the darkness: Zen talks on the Sandokai"by Shunryū Suzuki, University of California Press, ISBN 978-0-520-23212-9
- Welter, Albert (2006), The Formation of the Linji lu: An Examination of the Guangdeng lu/Sijia yulu and Linji Huizhao Chanshi yulu. Versions of the Linji lu in Historical Context (PDF), archived from the original (PDF) on 2013-03-16
- Welter, Albert (2000), Mahakasyapa's smile. Silent Transmission and the Kung-an (Koan) Tradition. In: Steven Heine and Dale S. Wright (eds)(2000): "The Koan. Texts and Contexts in Zen Buddhism, Oxford: Oxford University Press
- Yampolski, Philip B. (1967), The Platform Sutra of the Sixth Patriarch. Translated with notes by Philip B. Yampolski, Columbia University Press, ISBN 978-0-231-08361-4
- Yampolski, Philip (2003a), Chan. A Historical Sketch. In: Buddhist Spirituality. Later China, Korea, Japan and the Modern World; edited by Takeuchi Yoshinori, Delhi: Motilal Banarsidass
- Yampolski, Philip (2003b), Zen. A Historical Sketch. In: Buddhist Spirituality. Later China, Korea, Japan and the Modern World; edited by Takeuchi Yoshinori, Delhi: Motilal Banarsidass
- Yanagida, Seizan (2009), Historical Introduction to The Record of Linji. In: The record of Linji, translated by Ruth Fuller Sasakia e.a. Pages 59–115 (PDF), University of Hawaii Press, archived from the original (PDF) on 2012-06-22
- Yen, Chan Master Sheng (1996), Dharma Drum: The Life and Heart of Ch'an Practice, Boston & London: Shambhala
- Yoshizawa, Katsuhiro (2009), The Religious Art of Zen Master Hakuin, Counterpoint Press
- Young, Stuart (2009), Linji Lu and Chinese Orthodoxy. Review of "Albert Welter. The Linji lu and the Creation of Chan Orthodoxy: The Development of Chan's Records of Sayings Literature.
- Zeuschner, Robert B. (1976), A Selected Bibliography on Chan Buddhism in China, Journal of Chinese Philosophy V. 3, (1976) pp. 299-311
- Zhang, Shengyen; Stevenson, Dan (2002), Hoofprint of the Ox: Principles of the Chan Buddhist Path as Taught by a Modern Chinese Master, Oxford University Press
- Zhang, D., Dainian (2002). Key Concepts in Chinese Philosophy. Translated by Ryden, Edmund. Yale University Press. ISBN 0-300-09210-5 – via Google Books.
- Zhu, Caifang (2003), Buddhism in China Today: The Example of the Bai Lin Chan Monastery. In: Perspectives, Volume 4, No.2, June 2003 (PDF), archived from the original on 2010-09-29
- Zvelebil, K.V. (1987), "The Sound of the One Hand", Journal of the American Oriental Society, 107 (1): 125–126, doi:10.2307/602960, JSTOR 602960
