= Foyan Qingyuan =

Chinese Chan Buddhist monk (1067–1120)

Foyan Qingyuan (1067–1120) was an important master of Chan Buddhism in the Yangqi branch of the Linji School. He was a student of Wuzu Fayan (d. 1104), and was known as one of the "three Buddhas of East Mountain" (the mountain whose famous former resident had been the 5th Chan patriarch Hongren), along with his dharma brothers, Yuanwu Keqin and Taiping Huiqin (1059–1117).

== Teachings ==
Foyan emphasized independence and autonomy in his teachings. According to Cleary, Foyan "made no attempt to recruit disciples," wishing instead for people to be able to stand on their own feet. For example, Foyan said, "What do you go to a 'Zen center' for? You should make a living on your own, and not listen to what others say." He was critical of over-dependence on teachers, as can be seen in the following story, told by Foyan thus:

The second ancestor of Zen used to give talks wherever he happened to be, and all who heard him attained true awareness. He didn't establish any slogans or talk about causes and effects of practice and realization.
In his time there was a certain meditation teacher who sent a top disciple to listen in on the Zen ancestor. The disciple never came back. The meditation teacher was furious, and took the occasion of a congress to upbraid his former disciple for disloyalty.
The former disciple said, "My perception was originally true, but it was distorted by a teacher."
Later someone asked a Zen master, "Where is my power of perception?" The Zen master said, "It is not obtained from a teacher."
This is the way to attain Zen. An ancient said, "The Way is always with people, but people themselves chase after things."

In addition to his emphasis on independence and autonomy, Foyan was also critical of reliance on public cases and gong'an stories, arguing that such things did not exist during the time of Bodhidharma. He said, "In other places they like to have people look at model case stories, but here we have the model case story of what is presently coming into being; you should look at it, but no one can make you see all the way through such an immense affair."

An important theme repeated throughout Foyan's teachings is that of "saving energy." For example:

I always tell you that what is inherent in you is presently active and presently functioning, and need not be sought after, need not be put in order, need not be practiced or proven. All that is required is to trust it once and for all. This saves a lot of energy.

Similarly, Foyan said:

You shouldn’t strain to seek the path; if you seek it, you will lose the path. You need not strain to make things fluid; if you try to make them fluid, things remain as they are. If you neither seek nor try to produce fluidity, the path will merge with things; then what thing is not the path?

On the other hand, Foyan taught that while seeking was no different from "pursuing sounds and chasing forms," nonseeking made one no different from inert matter. Thus, Foyan taught that one should harmonize seeking and nonseeking. He said, "You must seek, and yet without seeking; not seek, yet still seek. If you can manage to penetrate this, you will then manage to harmonize seeking and nonseeking." (Note: Compare with the following from the Huayan mystic Li Tongxuan who said, "In the effortless effort, the effort is not in vain. In the effortful effort, all of the effort is impermanent," as well as the words of the Huayan patriarch Chengguan: "I strive 求 for this while there is no striving," and "principle does not impede things, thus it is not obstacle for the [true] intention. Things do not impede principle, thus intention is in fact a 'non-intention' (qiu ji wuqiu 求即無求). This kind of cultivation is called 'non-cultivation.' Cultivation in non-cultivation means that cultivation is in fact 'non-cultivation' (xiu ji wuxiu 修即無修); this is the real cultivation." The Japanese Rinzai master Takuan Sōhō also said, "If you shun desire and become like a rock or a piece of wood you can do nothing. With the help of the energy of desire one can transform desire (yoku) into no-desire (mu-yoku). This is the true way." See also the following from Takuan's Zen commentary on the Tao Te Ching: "Even though the Way cannot be seen except when you have no desire, people have eyes, so they see; they have ears, so they hear. Because such openings exist, there must also be desire. So the existence of desire in these openings is also subtle function. Since the presence of desire is the wonder in the openings, to speak of having no desire does not mean abandoning desire. Why? You can't cut off your ears and eyes and throw them away. As long as there are openings, there must be desires. Nevertheless, all existents are ultimately mental constructions. Therefore having desires is not the Way, yet abandoning them to be desireless is not the Way either. The point is that the Way is nothing in particular; it is just so. [...] 'These two' refers to having no desires and having desires. 'The same provenance' means they come from the same place. 'The same' means it is the same for both having no desire and having desire." The Tangut Chan text, Notes on the Essence of Hongzhou Doctrine with Commentary and Clarification, also says: "Further, [the question]: 'Is there the mind of desire or is there no mind of desire? If there is the mind of desire, then there is contradiction with the innate true substance. If there is no mind of desire, then the realization of the true way would thus be impossible to achieve.' The answer: '[The mind of desire] both exists and does not. When there is no mind of desire, [it] is all present in the [notion] of the self, [and] there is no dharma outside the mind. When the mind of desire is present, then one [thought] of awakening is the faith. [If one] is in harmony with that, he would realize the Dharmadhatu. That is about desire and the self." And: "There is nothing that exceeds the true mind of desire. All the Buddhas and masters penetrated [it] on the way of perfection.")
