= Hua Tou =

Form of Buddhist meditation

Hua Tou (simplified Chinese: 话头; traditional Chinese: 話頭, Korean: hwadu, Japanese: watō) is part of a form of Buddhist meditation known as Gongfu 工夫 (not to be confused with the Martial Arts 功夫) common in the teachings of Chan Buddhism, Korean Seon and Rinzai Zen. Hua Tou can be translated as 'word head', 'head of speech' or 'point beyond which speech exhausts itself'. A Hua Tou can be a short phrase that is used as a subject of meditation to focus the mind.

== Origins ==
Hua Tou are based on the encounter-dialogues and koan of the interactions between past masters and students, but are shorter phrases than koans. The Hua Tou method was invented by the Chinese Zen master Dahui Zonggao (1089–1163) who was a member of the Linji school. Dahui was interested in teaching the lay community, particularly the educated Chinese scholar-officials. Support of those "literati" was essential for the survival of the individual lineages, since appointments as abbot of public monasteries were determined by this ruling class. Providing accessible methods of training for layman was a means to gather this necessary support. Hua Tou practice does not use regular interviews and question and answer sessions between student and teacher (dokusan). According to Dahui, Hua Tou is also a form of meditation that "can be carried out by laymen in the midst of their daily activities."

Dahui was also against the intellectualism and literary commentary that had begun to enter into Koan practice with the Blue Cliff Record of his master Yuan-wu. In fact, Dahui burned his copy of the Blue Cliff Record.

Formal Hua Tou practice was promoted in Korea by Seon master Chinul. He was extremely successful in popularizing Hua Tou. According to Robert Buswell:

Hwadu is the predominant technique cultivated in [Korean] meditation halls, and almost all masters advocate its use for students at all levels.

According to Bhikkhu Analayo, a similar practice is found in the Pali commentaries relating to mindfulness of bodily postures. Analayo writes that according to the Papañcasudani "the difference between simple walking and walking meditation as a Satipatthana is that a meditator keeps in mind the question: 'Who goes? Whose is this going?'" (Ps I 251).

== Practice ==
Dahui emphasised that initial insight is essential for Zen-training. Dahui stressed that it was possible for laymen to achieve enlightenment through this practice. He often gave instructions through letters to his pupils.

Chinul described Hwadu (Hua Tou) in his treatise Dharma Collection and Special Practice Record (Korean: 법집별항녹절요사기; Hanja: 法集別行錄節要私記解; RR: Beopjip byeolhaeng nok jeolyo byeongip sagi) as a practice that leads to the very limits of speech and acts as a purification device. Because the practice leads students beyond conceptual understanding, Chinul considered it an advanced practice for those of particular talent, or those who had already advanced through other practices first.

To practice Hua Tou, one concentrates on the phrase, initially repeating it silently with a questioning and open mind and then thinking about "Who" or "What" is generating the Hua Tou, this brings about "Great Doubt". Hua Tou can be practiced during sitting meditation, after the mind has been calmed through an initial period of breath meditation.

Hsu Yun said of practicing Hua Tou:

The important thing is to stick to Hua Tou at all times, when walking, lying, or standing. From morning to night observing Hua Tou vividly and clearly, until it appears in your mind like the autumn moon reflected limpidly in quiet water. If you practice this way, you can be assured of reaching the state of Enlightenment.

In meditation, if you feel sleepy, you may open your eyes widely and straighten your back; you will then feel fresher and more alert than before.

When working on the Hua Tou, you should be neither too subtle nor too loose. If you are too subtle you may feel very serene and comfortable, but you are apt to lose the Hua Tou. The consequence will then be that you will fall into the ‘dead emptiness’. Right in the state of serenity, if you do not lose the Hua Tou, you may then be able to progress further than the top of the hundred-foot pole you have already ascended. If you are too loose, too many errant thoughts will attack you. You will then find it difficult to subdue them. In short, the Zen practitioner should be well adjusted, neither too tight nor too loose; in the looseness there should be tightness, and in the tightness there should be looseness.

According to Chan master Sheng Yen, there are three stages of Hua Tou practice: reciting the Hua Tou, asking the Hua Tou and investigating the Hua Tou. Through these stages it is important not to try to answer the Hua Tou intellectually, but to persistently ask the question mindfully with genuine interest and sincere desire to know. It is through this constant practice that great doubt and then insight arises.

According to Mario Poceski, although Dahui's kanhua Chan (in which one focuses on a huatou) purports to be a sudden method, it essentially consists of a process of gradually perfecting concentration. Poceski also observes the role the kanhua technique played in standardizing Chan practice. He argues that this contributed to the routinization of the tradition, resulting in a loss of some of the more open and creative aspects of earlier Chan.

== Examples of Hua Tou ==
According to Stuart Lachs, there are various popular Hua Tous such as:

- "What is it?" - very popular in Korean Seon
- "What is this?"
- "Who is repeating the Buddha's name?" - Popular with Chinese who also practice nianfo. This Huatou changes nianfo into a Chan practice.
- "Who is dragging this corpse around?" - popularized by Hsu Yun, who often recommended it as a first practice, it was given to him by Master Yong-jing of the Tian-tai sect.
- "Who am I?"
- "What was my Original face before my father and mother were born?" - from the Sixth Patriarch Huineng, and the 23rd case in the well known koan collection the Mumonkan
- "What is Mu?" (Note: Favored by Sheng Yen) - This is taken from the famous kōan of Joshu Mu which goes as follows: "A monk asked Joshu, 'Does a dog have Buddha-nature or not?' Joshu replied, 'Mu."

== Sources ==
- Lachs, Stuart (2012), Hua-t'ou : A Method of Zen Meditation (PDF)
- Schlütter, Morten (2008), How Zen became Zen. The Dispute over Enlightenment and the Formation of Chan Buddhism in Song-Dynasty China, Honolulu: University of Hawai'i Press, ISBN 978-0-8248-3508-8
- Yun, Hsu (1970), Practice of Zen, Translated by Garma C. C. Chang, Perennial Library / Harper & Row
- Yen, Sheng (2009), Shattering the Great Doubt: The Chan Practice of Huatou, Translated by, Dharma Drum publications
