= Dahui Zonggao =

12th-century Chinese Chan master

Dàhuì Zōnggǎo
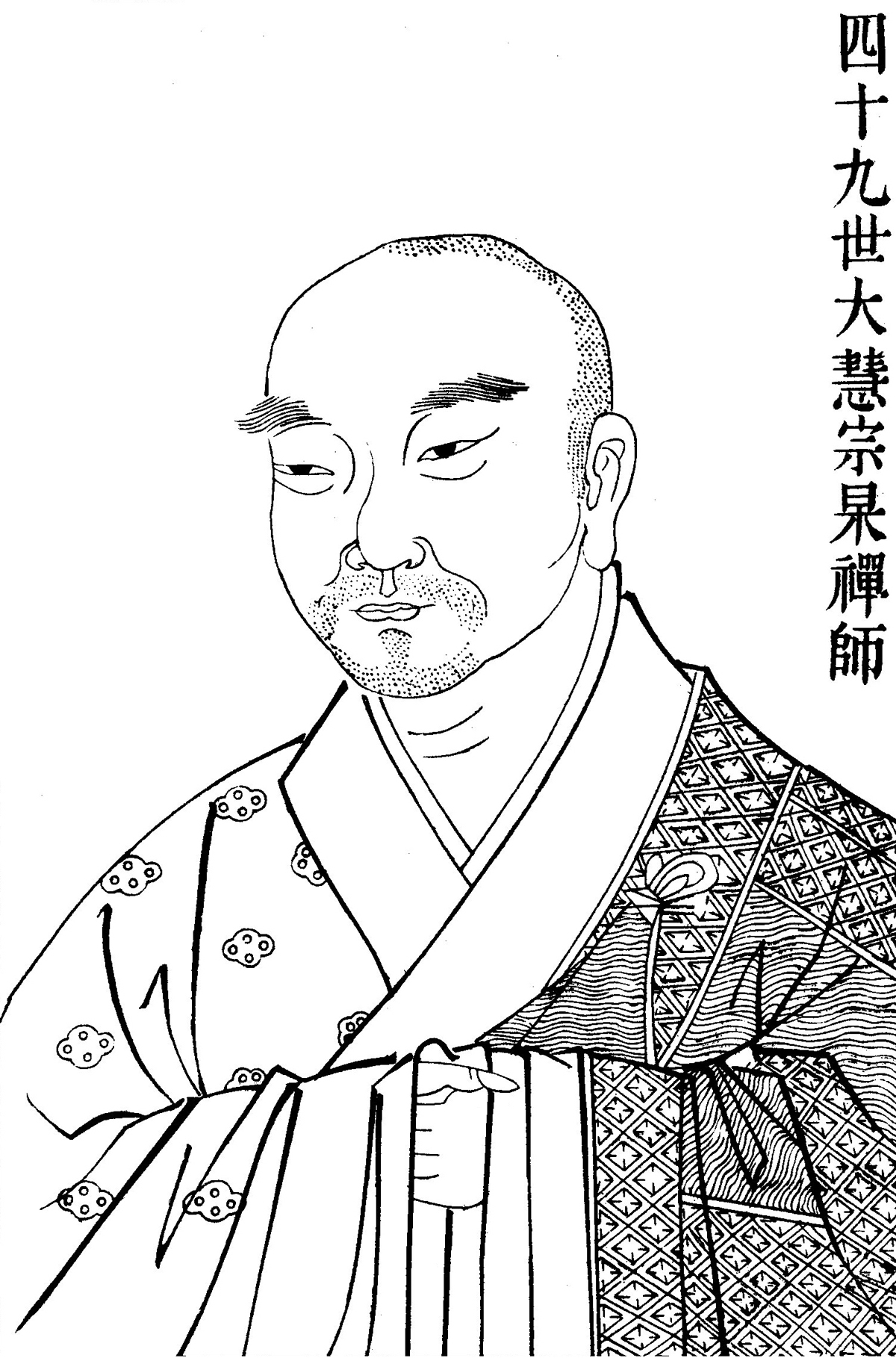

Personal life
- Born: 1089 China
- Died: 10 August 1163 (aged 73-74)

Religious life
- Religion: Buddhism
- School: Linji

Senior posting
- Predecessor: Yuanwu Keqin

Dahui Zonggao (1089–10 August 1163) (Chinese: 大慧宗杲; Wade–Giles: Ta-hui Tsung-kao; Japanese: Daie Sōkō; Vietnamese: Đại Huệ Tông Cảo) was a 12th-century Chinese Chan (Zen) master. Dahui was a student of Yuanwu Keqin (Wade–Giles: Yuan-wu K'o-ch'in; Japanese: Engo Kokugon) (1063–1135) and was the 12th generation of the Linji school of Chan Buddhism. He was the dominant figure of the Linji school during the Song dynasty.

Dahui introduced the practice of kan huatou, or "inspecting the critical phrase," of a kōan story. This method was called the "Chan of gongan (kōan) introspection" (看話禪 Kanhua Chan).

Dahui was a vigorous critic of what he called the "heretical Chan of silent illumination" (默照邪禪 Mozhao Xie Chan) of the Caodong school (Wade–Giles: Ts'ao-tung; Japanese: Sōtō).

== Biography ==
=== Early years ===
Dahui was born in Xuancheng, Anhui, to the Xi (奚) family. He left home at sixteen and became a Buddhist monk at seventeen. His initiatory name was Zong Gao. Following the tradition of the day, he wandered from Chan community to community, seeking instruction. He studied under a Caodong master and mastered the essentials of the Five Ranks in two years. He studied all the records of the Five Houses of Chan, being particularly drawn to the words of Yunmen Wenyan (雲門文偃 Wade–Giles: Yün-men Wên-yen Japanese: Ummon Bun’en), 864–949, founder of one of the "Five Houses" of Chan. He sought out instruction on the sayings of the old masters collected and commented on by Xuedou Chongxian (雪竇重顯Wade–Giles: Hsüeh-tou Ch’ung-hsien; Japanese: Setchō Jūken) which became the basis for the koan collection, the Blue Cliff Record.

=== Zhantang ===
Dissatisfied with intellectual study, at the age of twenty-one he went to Treasure Peak, near the modern city of Nanchang in Jiangxi Province, to study with Zhantang Wenzhun (湛堂文準 Wade–Giles: Chan-t'ang Wen-chun), a master of the Huang-long (黃龍) branch of the Linji School. Although Dahui developed a great intellectual understanding of Chan, enlightenment eluded him. Recognizing his potential and great intellectual abilities, Zhantang Wenzhun (Zhan Tangzhun) made Dahui his personal attendant. One day Wenzhun asked Dahui,

"Why are your nostrils boundless today?"
Dahui replied, "(Because) I’m at your place."
Tangzhou retorted, "You phony Chan man."

Another time, when Dahui was twenty-six, Wenzhun called him over and said,

You can talk about Ch'an very well; you can quote the sayings of former masters and write commentaries on them. You are eloquent in giving sermons and quick with the exchanges during interviews. But there is one thing which you still do not know".

Ta-hui asked what it was.

Tangzhou answered, "What you do not have is the awakening. Thus, when I talk with you in my room, you have Chan. But as soon as you leave the room, you lose it. When you are awake and attentive, you have Chan. But as soon as you fall asleep, you lose it. If you continue like this, how can you ever conquer life and death?"

Dahui agreed, saying, "This is precisely my point of doubt."

=== Yuanwu ===
Dahui continued his studies with Yuanwu Keqin(圜悟克勤). On his way to Tianning Wanshou, a monastery in the old imperial city of Bian (modern Kaifeng), Dahui vowed to work with Yuanwu for nine years and if he did not achieve enlightenment, or, if Yuanwu turned out to be a false teacher, giving approval too easily, Dahui would give up and turn to writing scriptures or treatises.

Yuanwu gave Dahui Yunmen’s saying, "East Mountain walks on the water" as a koan to work through. Dahui threw himself into the koan and struggled with it day and night, giving forty-nine answers to the koan, but all were rejected by his teacher. Finally, on May 13, 1125, he broke through. Later, he recalled the event:

Master Yuan-wu ascended the high seat in the lecture hall at the request of Madame Chang K'ang-kuo (張康國夫人). He said, "Once a monk asked Yun-men this question, 'where do all the Buddhas come from?' Yun-men answered. 'The East Mountain walks over the water' (Tung-shan shuei sheng hsing). But if I were he, I would have given a different answer. 'Where do all the Buddhas come from?' 'As the fragrant breeze comes from the south, a slight coolness naturally stirs in the palace pavilion.'" When I heard this, all of a sudden there was no more before and after. Time stopped. I ceased to feel any disturbance in my mind, and remained in a state of utter calmness.

As it turned out, Yuanwu did not give approval too easily. He said,

It is indeed not easy to arrive at your present state of mind. But unfortunately, you have only died but are not yet reborn. Your greatest problem is that you do not doubt words enough. Don't you remember this saying? 'When you let go your hold on the precipice, you become the master of your own fate; to die and afterward come to life again, no one can then deceive you.

Yuanwu gave Dahui the koan, "To be and not to be – it is like a wisteria leaning on a tree" to work on and after six months, Dahui achieved the final breakthrough and was recognized by Yuanwu as a Dharma-heir in the Linji tradition.

=== Teaching career ===
Yuanwu assigned teaching duties to Dahui and Dahui’s fame spread far and wide. A high ranking government official, the Minister of the Right, Lu Shun, gave Dahui a purple robe and the honorific, "Fori", the Sun of the Dharma. The following year, 1126, the Jürchen Jin dynasty captured the Emperors Huizong and Qinzong; the capital was moved to the south and the Southern Song era began.

Dahui also moved south and taught both monks and laymen. It was at this time that he began his severe criticism of the "heretical Chan of silent illumination" of the Caodong school which he would continue for the rest of his life. He became a great favorite of the educated and literate classes as well as Chan monks and in 1137, at the age of forty-nine, Chancellor Zhang Jun (張浚), a student of Dahui, appointed him abbot of Jingshan monastery in the new capital Lin-an (modern Hangzhou, Zhejiang). Within a few years his sangha grew to two thousand and among his lay followers were many high-ranking officials. Dahui became the acknowledged leader of Buddhism of the Southern Song dynasty.

=== Exile and return ===
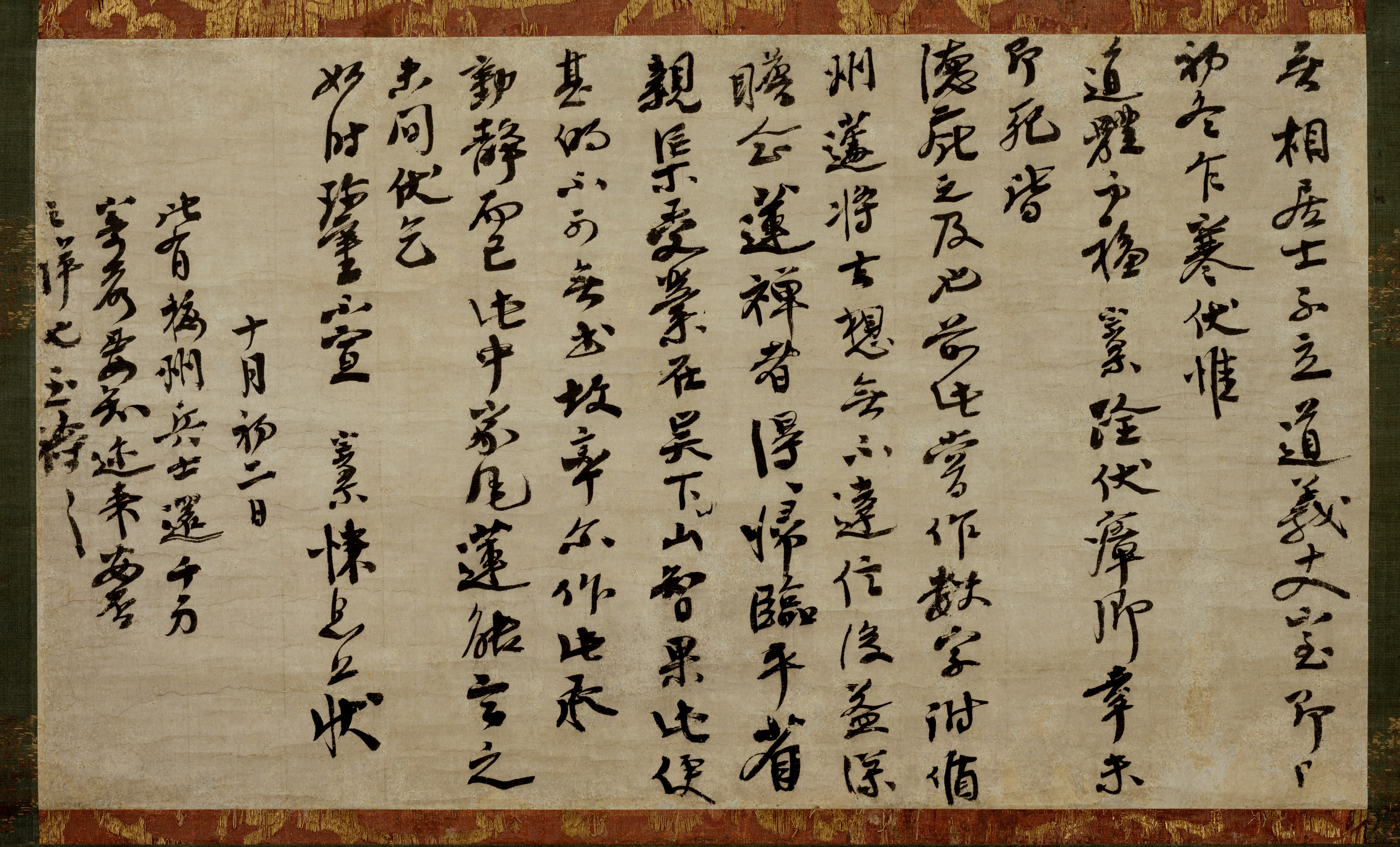
A letter written by Dahui to a friend during his exile

However, disaster was about to befall him. Because of his association with a high official who fell out of favor with the prime minister, all Dahui’s imperial honors and his ordination certificate were stripped from him and he was sent in exile to Hengzhou (Hunan) in the year 1141. At the age of sixty-two he was transferred to present day Guangdong, a place notorious in those days for plagues and hostile elements. Some fifty of Dahui’s monks died there in a plague. Throughout these difficult years, Dahui continued teaching in the Linji tradition of Chan Buddhism, attracting both gentry and commoners. Finally, in 1155, Dahui was pardoned and was allowed to return to his former monastery at Jingshan where he continued his teaching until he died five years later on 10 August 1163. He wrote a final verse for his disciples, saying, "Without a verse, I couldn’t die."

Birth is thus
Death is thus
Verse or no verse
What’s the fuss?

Emperor Xiaozong of Song bestowed upon him the posthumous title "Chan Master of Great Wisdom," from which the name Dahui derives.

== Teachings ==
The enlightenment experience as the answer to the riddle of life and death, and the great doubt necessary to have the determination to break through, became central to Dahui’s teaching.

=== Kanhua chan ===
Dahui’s letters to lay people reveal a compassionate teacher, who believed that the enlightenment promised by the Buddha was available to all people, regardless of their daily activities. The best way to achieve this was through the use of gong-ans as a daily meditation device.

==== Gong-ans ====
Gong-ans developed during the Tang dynasty (618–907) from the recorded sayings collections of Chán-masters, which quoted many stories of "a famous past Chán figure's encounter with disciples or other interlocutors and then offering his own comment on it". Those stories and the accompanying comments were used to educate students, and broaden their insight into the Buddhist teachings.

Those stories came to be known as gongan, "public cases". Such a story was only considered a gongan when it was commented upon by another Chán-master. This practice of commenting on the words and deeds of past masters confirmed the master's position as awakened master in a lineage of awakened masters of the past.

Dahui saw this practice of commenting on gongans in his time as becoming a superficial literary study. In a radical move to counter this literary emphasis, he even ordered the suppression of his own teacher’s masterly collection of koans, The Blue Cliff Record (Wade–Giles: Pi Yen Lu; Pinyin: Bìyán Lù; Japanese: Hekiganroku), burning all copies and the wooden blocks to print them, effectively taking the venerated text out of circulation for the next two centuries.

==== Hua tou practice ====
Dahui introduced the use of k'an-hua, the concentration on the hua tou ("word head") of a gong-an to attain insight. Until his time, the developing gongan-tradition consisted mainly of commenting on "old cases", adding comments and poetry. This use of written comments and poetry shows the influence of Chinese literati culture, to which both state officials and most Buddhist higher clergy belonged.

Although there were hundreds of koans available, Dahui used only a few, believing that deep penetration of one or two koans would be enough to attain initial awakening or insight. To achieve this, one had to work assiduously and with great determination, like someone whose "head is on fire". It mattered little to Dahui whether a person was particularly intelligent or not – liberation was available to all. He wrote:

It doesn’t matter whether your rational understanding is sharp or dull; it has nothing to do with matters of sharpness or dullness, nor does it have anything to do with quiet or confusion.

Dahui often used the famous mu-koan, "A monk asked Zhàozhōu, ‘Does a dog have Buddha-nature or does it not have Buddha-nature?’ Zhàozhōu replied, ‘wu’ (Chinese; Japanese: Mu), "no," "not" (which later became the 18th koan in the collection The Book of Equanimity published 61 years after his death in 1224 and then appearing again as the first koan in The Gateless Gate published 4 years later in 1228). Dahui taught that

This one word ‘no’ is a knife to sunder the doubting mind of birth and death. The handle of this knife is in one’s own hand alone: you can’t have anyone else wield it for you…You consent to take hold of it yourself only if you can abandon your life. If you cannot abandon your life, just keep to where your doubt remains unbroken for a while: suddenly you’ll consent to abandon your life, and then you’ll be done.

According to Poceski, although Dahui's kanhua Chan purports to be a sudden method, it essentially consists of a process of gradually perfecting concentration. Poceski also observes the role the kanhua technique played in standardizing Chan practice. He argues that this contributed to the routinization of the tradition, resulting in a loss of some of the more open and creative aspects of earlier Chan.

==== Doubt ====
The concept of ‘doubt’ was very important in Dahui’s teaching. He warned his students that they must ‘doubt’ words to not be fooled by them. Furthermore, they needed to ‘doubt’ their very existence. He said,

Many students today do not doubt themselves, but they doubt others. And so it is said, ‘Within great doubt there necessarily exists great enlightenment.’

==== Influence on the Rinzai-tradition ====
His teachings on kanhua practice became the standard for the Linji school tradition of koan practice in China, Korea and Japan. Dahui exerted a strong influence on the Japanese Rinzai teacher Hakuin Ekaku, who also taught great doubt as necessary to awaken.

=== Rejection of silent illumination ===
Dahui’s teachings contain relentless attacks on the practice of silent illumination, sitting in meditation in tranquility and quietness. He labeled teachers of this type of meditation practice as "heretical" and complained,

They just sit in a ghostly cave on a dark mountain after their meals. They call this practice "silent illumination", "dying the great death", "the state before the birth of one's parents." They sit there until calluses appear on their bottoms, yet they still do not dare to move."

To his opinion this type of practice leads to drowsiness, blankness and intellectualization and conceptualization of Chan Buddhism rather than enlightenment. He thought that teachers who taught this method of meditation had "never awakened themselves, they don’t believe anyone has awakened." For Dahui, koans were the only way to enlightenment and without koans, one would "be like a blind man without a walking stick: unable to take even one step." But koans had to be penetrated fully, not intellectualized. It was this fear of superficiality and intellectualization of old koans that led him to destroy all copies of his own teacher’s masterpiece, the Blue Cliff Record, to save Chan and to authenticate proper koan practice.

== Writings ==
Only one work can be attributed to Dahui, a collection of koans entitled Zhengfa Yanzang 正法眼藏 (The Storehouse of the True Dharma Eye, J. Shobogenzo) (Note: Dogen's unattributed use of Dahui's title Cheng-fa yen-tsang for Dogen's own most famous life work is an example of Dogen's broad influences. Upon arriving in China, Dogen first studied under Wuji Lepai, a disciple of Dahui, so this is most likely the source of Dogen's knowledge of Dahui's Cheng fa yen tsang. Whether Dogen's failure to attribute his appropriation of the title was simply the manner of the day or deliberate obfuscation is open to interpretation and debate. See also Note 3 of Some Problems in Interpretation: The Early and Late Writings of Dogen)

Dahui also compiled the Chánlín Bǎo Xùn (禪林寶訓, "Treasured Teachings of the Chan Monastic Tradition"), instructions of former Chan abbots about the virtues and ideals of monastic life, in collaboration with another monk, Dagui. A disciple of Dahui, Zuyong, compiled a collection of Dahui’s life and teaching called Dahui Bujue Chanshi Nianbu ("Chronological Biography of Chan Master Dahui"). The Zhiyue lu, compiled by Qu Ruji, also contains information on Dahui’s teachings and is the basis of the J. C. Cleary translation Swampland Flowers, of which the majority is a collection of letters Dahui wrote to his students.

== See also ==
- Index of Buddhism-related articles
- Schools of Buddhism
- Chan Buddhism
- Yuanwu Keqin
- Kanhua Chan

== Sources ==
- Buswell, Robert E. (1991), The "Short-cut" Approach of K'an-hua Meditation: The Evolution of a Practical Subitism in Chinese Ch'an Buddhism. In: Peter N. Gregory (editor) (1991), Sudden and Gradual. Approaches to Enlightenment in Chinese Thought, Delhi: Motilal Banarsidass Publishers Private Limited
- Cleary, J.C., 1997 (2006), Swampland Flowers: the letters and lectures of Zen master Ta Hui, Shambhala, ISBN 978-1-59030-318-4
- Cleary, T.; Cleary, J.C. (1977), The Blue Cliff Record, Shambhala, ISBN 0-87773-622-7
- Cleary, T. & Cleary, J.C., 1994, Zen Letters: teachings of Yuanwu, Shambhala, ISBN 0-87773-931-5
- Dumoulin, Heinrich (1994, 1998) Zen Buddhism: A History, Volume I, India and China, Simon & Schuster and Prentice Hall International ISBN 0-02-897109-4
- Ferguson, Andy (2000) Zen’s Chinese Heritage: the masters and their teachings, Wisdom Publications, ISBN 0-86171-163-7
- Foster, Nelson & Shoemaker, Jack (eds), 1996, The Roaring Stream: a new Zen reader, The Ecco Press, Hopewell, ISBN 0-88001-344-3
- Heine, Steven & Wright, Dale S., 2000, The Koan: texts and contexts in Zen Buddhism, Oxford University Press, ISBN 0-19-511749-2
- Leighton, Taigen Daniel; Yi Wu (1991), Cultivating the Empty Field: the silent illumination of Zen master Hongzhi, North Point Press, ISBN 0-86547-475-3
- Levering, Miriam A Monk's Literary Education: Dahui's Friendship with Juefan Huihong; Chung-Hwa Buddhist Journal, No.13.2 (May 2000) pp. 369–384
- McRae, John (2003), Seeing Through Zen. Encounter, Transformation, and Genealogy in Chinese Chan Buddhism, The University Press Group Ltd, ISBN 978-0-520-23798-8
- Schlütter, Morten (2008), How Zen became Zen. The Dispute over Enlightenment and the Formation of Chan Buddhism in Song-Dynasty China, Honolulu: University of Hawai'i Press, ISBN 978-0-8248-3508-8
- Watson, Burton, 1993, The Zen Teachings of Master Lin-Chi, Shambhala, ISBN 0-87773-891-2
- Yu, Chun-Fang, 1979, Ta-hui Tsung-kao and Kung-an Ch'an, Journal of Chinese Philosophy, v. 6, p. 211–235

Buddhist titles
Preceded by Yuanwu Keqin	Linji Chan/Ōtōkan Rinzai school patriarch 1089–1163	Succeeded by Zhuoan Deguang
