= Yuanwu Keqin =

Chan Buddhist monk and intellect

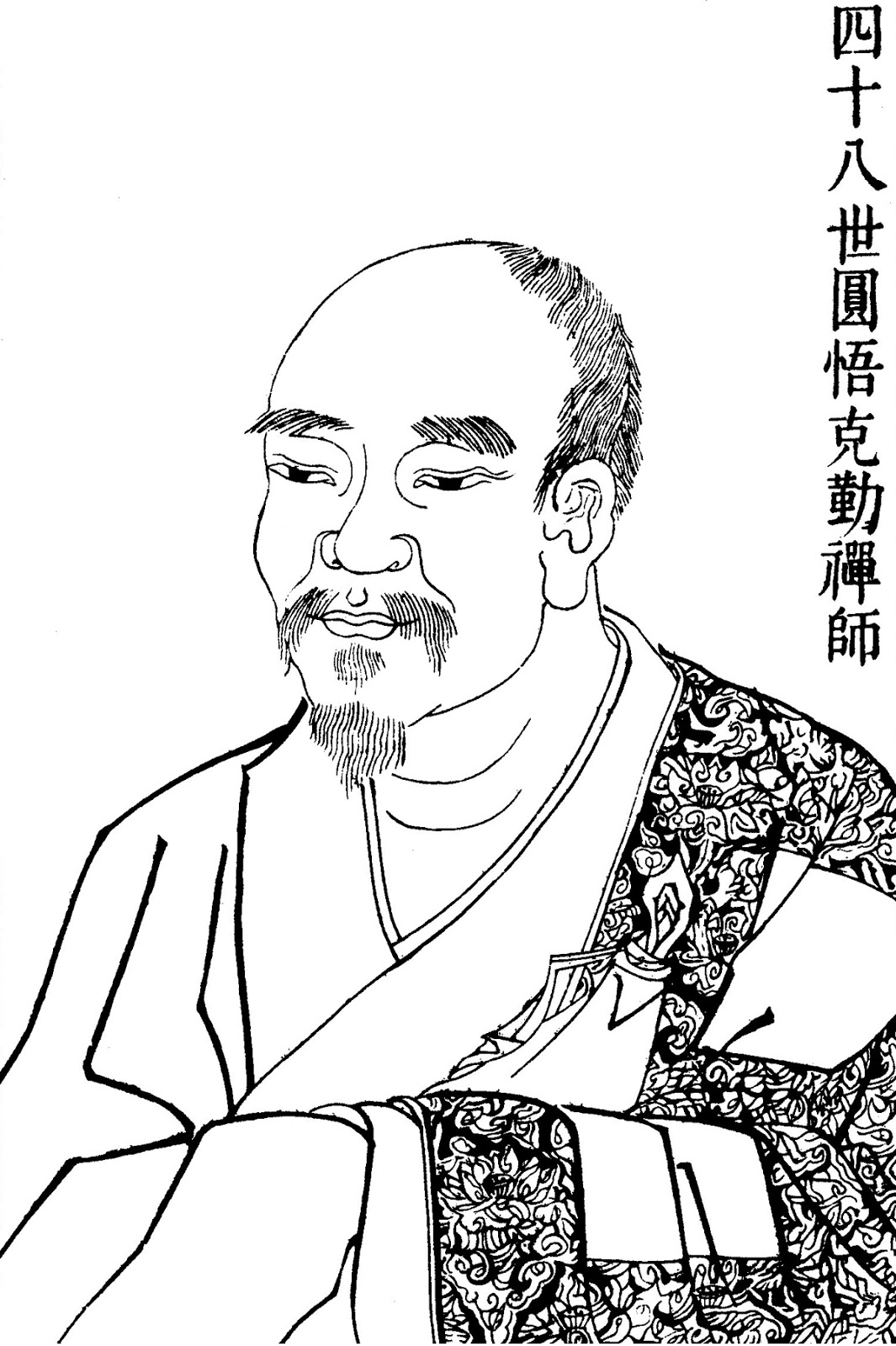
- Title: Monk

Personal life
- Born: 1063 China
- Died: 1135 (aged 71–72)

Religious life
- Religion: Buddhism
- School: Chan Buddhism

Senior posting
- Successor: Dahui Zonggao

Yuanwu Keqin (Chinese: 圓悟克勤; pinyin: Yuánwù Kèqín; Wade–Giles: Yuan-wu K'e-ch'in; Japanese: Engo Kokugon) (1063–1135) was a Han Chinese Chan monk who compiled the Blue Cliff Record.

== Biography ==
Yuanwu Keqin was born into the Le family of Pengzhou, Sichuan, in 1063. His family was well educated in Confucianism, a sign of acquaintance with the Chinese civil service. Nevertheless, Yuanwu Keqin choose a Buddhist monastic path and entered Miaoji Monastery (Chinese: 妙寂禪院; pinyin: Miàojì Chányuàn, a Buddhist monastery in Pengzhou. He ended his formal studies under Wuzu Fayan (1047-1104) when he was in his forties. Yuanwu Keqin was closely involved in the literati circles.

== Blue Cliff Record ==
Yuanwu Keqin belonged to the Linji school. He was the teacher of Dahui Zonggao, who introduced the Hua Tou practice.

Starting from the year 1112 on, Yuan-wu started to lecture on the One Hundred Old Cases and Verses [to the Cases] compiled by Xuedou Zhongxian (980–1052). These lectures resulted in the Blue Cliff Record.

The Blue Cliff Record gives clear instructions about the correct approach to kōan. Yuanwu went as far as to annotate the poems line by line to make clear the correct reading of Xuedou's appended verses, which are complex, because of the rich use of symbolism and the allusions to Chinese secular literature and to Chan history.

According to the Chan-tradition, the Blue Cliff Record gained such a popularity, that Dahui Zonggao burned all the copies he could lay hands on, and the wooden printing blocks.

== Sources ==
- Cleary, J. C.; Cleary, Thomas (1994), Zen Letters: Teachings of Yuanwu, Shambhala Publications
- Hsieh, Ding-Hwa Evely (Summer 1994), "Yuan-wu K'o-ch'in's (1063-1135) Teaching of Ch'an Kung-an Practice: A Transition from the Literary Study of Ch'an Kung-an to the Practical K'an-hua Ch'an", Journal of the International Association of Buddhist Studies, 17 (1)
- Schlütter, Morten (2008), How Zen became Zen. The Dispute over Enlightenment and the Formation of Chan Buddhism in Song-Dynasty China, Honolulu: University of Hawai'i Press, ISBN 978-0-8248-3508-8
