= Mu (negative) =

Term meaning 'not', 'without', or 'lack'

Chinese name
- Traditional Chinese: 無
- Simplified Chinese: 无
Transcriptions
Standard Mandarin
- Hanyu Pinyin: wú
Yue: Cantonese
- Jyutping: mou^{4}
Southern Min
- Hokkien POJ: bô

Korean name
- Hangul: 무
- Hanja: 無
Transcriptions
- Revised Romanization: mu

Japanese name
- Kanji: 無
- Hiragana: む
Transcriptions
- Revised Hepburn: mu

Chinese traditional character for Wu

In the Sinosphere, the word 無, realized in Japanese and Korean as mu and in Standard Chinese as wu, (Note: Hangul: 무 Simplified Chinese: 无; pinyin: wú) meaning 'to lack' or 'without', is a key term in the vocabulary of various East Asian philosophical and religious traditions, such as Buddhism and Taoism.

== Etymology ==
The character mu in seal script.

The character mu in cursive script

The Old Chinese *ma (無) is cognate with the Proto-Tibeto-Burman *ma, meaning 'not'. This reconstructed root is widely represented in Tibeto-Burman languages; for instance, ma means 'not' in both Tibetan and Burmese.

== Pronunciations ==
The Standard Chinese pronunciation of wú (無; 'not', 'nothing') historically derives from the c. 7th century Middle Chinese mju, the c. 3rd century Late Han Chinese muɑ, and the reconstructed c. 6th century BCE Old Chinese *ma.

Other varieties of Chinese have differing pronunciations of Chinese: 無. Compare Cantonese mou4; and Southern Min [bo˧˥] (Quanzhou) and [bə˧˥] (Zhangzhou).

The common Chinese word wú (無) was adopted in the Sino-Japanese, Sino-Korean, and Sino-Vietnamese vocabularies. The Japanese kanji 無 has on'yomi readings of mu or bu, and a kun'yomi (Japanese reading) of na. It is a fourth-grade kanji. The Korean hanja 無 is read mu (in Revised, McCune–Reischauer, and Yale romanization systems). The Vietnamese Hán-Việt pronunciation is vô or mô.

== Meanings ==
Some English translation equivalents of wu or mu are:

- "no", "not", "nothing", or "without"
- "nothing", "not", "nothingness", "un-", "is not", "has not", "not any"
  1. Pure awareness, prior to experience or knowledge. This meaning is used especially by the Chan school of Buddhism.
  2. A negative.
  3. Caused to be nonexistent.
  4. Impossible; lacking reason or cause.
  5. Nonexistence; nonbeing; not having; a lack of, without.
  6. The "original nonbeing" from which being is produced in the Tao Te Ching.

In modern Chinese, Japanese and Korean it is commonly used in combination words as a negative prefix to indicate the absence of something (no ..., without ..., un- prefix), e.g., Chinese: 无-线; pinyin: wú-xiàn/mu-sen (無-線)/mu-seon (무-선) for "wireless". In Classical Chinese, it is an impersonal existential verb meaning "not have".

The same character is also used in Classical Chinese as a prohibitive particle, though in this case it is more properly written Chinese: 毋; pinyin: wú.

== Characters ==
In traditional Chinese character classification, the uncommon class of phonetic loan characters involved borrowing the character for one word to write another near-homophone. For instance, the character 其 originally depicted a winnowing basket (ji), and scribes used it as a graphic loan for qi (其, "his; her; its"), which resulted in a new character ji (箕) (clarified with the bamboo radical ⺮) to specify the basket.

The character wu (無) originally meant "dance" and was later used as a graphic loan for wu, "not". The earliest graphs for 無 pictured a person with outstretched arms holding something (possibly sleeves, tassels, ornaments) and represented the word wu "dance; dancer". After wu meaning "dance" was borrowed as a loan for wu meaning "not; without", the original meaning was elucidated with the radical 舛, "opposite feet" at the bottom of wu, 舞 "dance".

== Mu-kōan ==
The Gateless Gate, a 13th-century collection of Zen kōan, uses the word wu or mu in its title (Wumenguan or Mumonkan 無門關) and first kōan case ("Zhao Zhou's Dog" 趙州狗子). Chinese Chan calls the word mu 無 "the gate to enlightenment". The Japanese Rinzai school classifies the Mu Kōan as hosshin 発心 "resolve to attain enlightenment", that is, appropriate for beginners seeking kenshō "to see the Buddha-nature".

Case 1 of The Gateless Gate reads as follows:

Chinese	English translation
趙州和尚、因僧問、狗子還有佛性也無。州云、無。	A monk asked Zhaozhou Congshen, a Chinese Zen master (known as Jōshū in Japanese), "Has a dog Buddha-nature or not?" Zhaozhou answered, "Wú" (in Japanese, Mu)

The koan originally comes from the Zhaozhou Zhenji Chanshi Yulu (Chinese: 趙州真際禪師語錄), The Recorded Sayings of Zen Master Zhao Zhou, koan 132:

Chinese	English translation
僧問：狗子還有佛性也無？ 師云：無。 問：上至諸佛，下至螻蟻皆有佛性，狗子為什麼卻無？ 師云：為伊有業識在。	A monk asked, "Does a dog have a Buddha-nature or not?" The master said, "Not [Mu]!" The monk said, "Above to all the Buddhas, below to the crawling bugs, all have Buddha-nature. Why is it that the dog has not?" The master said, "Because he has the nature of karmic delusions".

The Book of Serenity (Chinese: 從容録; pinyin: Cóngróng lù), also known as the Book of Equanimity or more formally the Hóngzhì Chánshī Guǎnglù (Chinese: 宏智禪師廣錄), has a longer version of this koan, which adds the following to the start of the version given in the Zhaozhou Zhenji Chanshi Yulu.

Chinese	English translation
僧問趙州，狗子有佛性也無。 州云，有。 僧云，既有為什麼卻撞入這箇皮袋。 州云，為他知而故犯。	A monk asked Master Zhao Zhou, "Does a dog have Buddha Nature?" Zhao Zhou replied, "Yes." And then the monk said, "Since it has, how did it get into that bag of skin?" Zhao Zhou said, "Because knowingly, he purposefully offends."

=== Origins ===
In the original text, the question is used as a conventional beginning to a question-and-answer exchange (mondo). The reference is to the Mahāyāna Mahāparinirvāṇa Sūtra which says for example:

In this light, the undisclosed store of the Tathagata is proclaimed: "All beings have the Buddha-Nature".

Koan 363 in the Zhaozhou Zhenji Chanshi Yulu shares the same beginning question.

=== Interpretations ===
This koan is one of several traditionally used by Rinzai school to initiate students into Zen study, and interpretations of it vary widely. Hakuun Yasutani of the Sanbo Kyodan maintained that:

The koan is not about whether a dog does or does not have a Buddha-nature because everything is Buddha-nature, and either a positive or negative answer is absurd because there is no particular thing called Buddha-nature.

This koan is discussed in Part 1 of Hau Hoo's The Sound of the One Hand: 281 Zen Koans with Answers. In it, the answer of "negative", mu, is clarified as although all beings have potential Buddha-nature, beings who do not have the capacity to see it and develop it essentially do not have it. The purpose of this primary koan to a student is to free the mind from analytic thinking and into intuitive knowing. A student who understands the nature of his question would understand the importance of awareness of potential to begin developing it.

==== Yoshitaka and Heine ====
The Japanese scholar Iriya Yoshitaka made the following comment on the two versions of the koan:

I have held doubts for some time even with regard to the way the so-called "Chao-chou's Word No" has been previously dealt with. To the question "Does a dog have the Buddha-nature?", on the one hand Monk Chao-chou replied affirmatively, but on the other hand he replied negatively. However, Zen adherents in Japan have rendered the koan exclusively in terms of his negative response, and completely ignored the affirmative one. Moreover, it has been the custom from the outset to reject the affirmative response as superficial compared to the negative one. It seems that the Wu-men kuan is responsible for this peculiarity.

A similar critique has been given by Steven Heine:

The common approach espoused [...] emphasizes a particular understanding of the role of the koan based on the “head-word” or “critical phrase” method developed by the prominent twelfth century Chinese master, Daie. This approach takes the “Mu” response in a non-literal way to express a transcendental negation that becomes the topic of an intensive contemplative experience, during which any and all thoughts or uses of reason and words are to be cut off and discarded for good rather than investigated for their expressive nuances and ramifications. Yet, historical studies demonstrate quite persuasively that an overemphasis on this single approach to one version of the kōan is somewhat misleading.

== Non-dualistic meaning ==
In Robert M. Pirsig's 1974 novel Zen and the Art of Motorcycle Maintenance, mu is translated as "no thing", saying that it meant "unask the question". He offered the example of a computer circuit using the binary numeral system, in effect using mu to represent high impedance:

For example, it's stated over and over again that computer circuits exhibit only two states, a voltage for "one" and a voltage for "zero." That's silly! Any computer-electronics technician knows otherwise. Try to find a voltage representing one or zero when the power is off! The circuits are in a mu state.

The word features prominently with a similar meaning in Douglas Hofstadter's 1979 book, Gödel, Escher, Bach. It is used fancifully in discussions of symbolic logic, particularly Gödel's incompleteness theorems, to indicate a question whose "answer" is to either un-ask the question, indicate the question is fundamentally flawed, or reject the premise that a dualistic answer can be given.

"Mu" may be used similarly to "N/A" or "not applicable," a term often used to indicate that the question cannot be answered because the conditions of the question do not match the reality. An example of this concept could be with the loaded question "Have you stopped beating your wife?", where "mu" would be considered the only respectable response.

The programming language Raku uses "Mu" for the root of its type hierarchy.

== See also ==
- Falsum
- Ma (negative space)
- Many-valued logic
- Muji, a Japanese clothing retailer self-styled as "no-brand"
- Mushin (mental state) - Japanese concept of "no mind"
- Mokusatsu
- Neti neti
- Not even wrong
- Nothingness
- Śūnyatā - Buddhist concept of emptiness
- Wronger than wrong
- Wu (awareness) - Chinese concept of enlightenment
- Wuji (philosophy)
- Wu wei, a term in Chinese philosophy
