= Hara Tanzan =

Japanese philosopher (1819–1892)

Hara Tanzan (原坦山, December 5, 1819 – July 27, 1892) was a Japanese philosopher and Sōtō Buddhist monk. He served as abbot of Saijoji temple in Odawara and as professor at the University of Tokyo during the Bakumatsu and Meiji era. He was a forerunner of the modernization of Japanese Buddhism and the first (in Japan) to attempt to incorporate concepts from the natural sciences into Zen Buddhism.

== Life ==
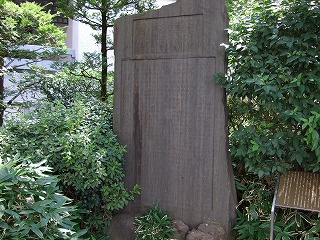
Monument of Hara Tanzan at Komazawa University

Hara was born in Iwakitaira Domain, Mutsu Province (present-day Iwaki, Fukushima Prefecture), the eldest son of samurai Arai Yūsuke. At the age of 15, Hara enrolled at the Shoheizaka Academy (昌平坂学問所) where he studied both Confucianism and medicine, the latter under Taki Genken. At the age of 20 or 26, he entered Buddhist priesthood, though he would go on to study Western medicine later in life.

Hara became the first lecturer of Indian Philosophy and Buddhist Studies at Tokyo Imperial University in 1879. He was later superintendent of the Soto-shu Daigaku-rin (currently Komazawa University).

There's a koan about Tanzan in which he writes and mails sixty postal cards on the day of his death. He announced his departure from the world in the post card.

== Appearances in Koans ==
Hara is featured in several koans. The koans frequently demonstrate his disregard of many of the precepts of everyday Buddhism, such as dietary laws.

=== The Muddy Road ===
The following is one of the most famous stories of Tanzan.

Tanzan and Ekido were once traveling together down a muddy road. Heavy rain was falling. As they came around a bend, they met a lovely girl in a silk kimono and sash, unable to cross at an intersection.

"Come on, girl," said Tanzan at once. Lifting her in his arms, he carried her over the mud.

Ekido did not speak until that night when they reached a lodging temple. Then he could no longer restrain himself. "We monks don't go near females," he told Tanzan, "especially not young and lovely ones. It is dangerous. Why did you do that?"

"I left the girl there," said Tanzan. "Are you still carrying her?"

=== A Buddha ===
In Tokyo in the Meiji era there lived two prominent teachers of opposite characteristics. One, Unsho, an instructor in Shingon, kept Buddha's precepts scrupulously. He never drank intoxicants, nor did he eat after eleven o'clock in the morning.

The other teacher, Tanzan, a professor of philosophy at the Imperial University, never observed the precepts. When he felt like eating he ate, and when he felt like sleeping in the daytime he slept.

One day Unsho visited Tanzan, who was drinking wine at the time, not even a drop of which is supposed to touch the tongue of a Buddhist.

'Hello, brother,' Tanzan greeted him. 'Won't you have a drink?'

'I never drink!' exclaimed Unsho solemnly.

'One who does not drink is not even human,' said Tanzan.

'Do you mean to call me inhuman just because I do not indulge in intoxicating liquids!' exclaimed Unsho in anger. Then if I am not human, what am I?'

'A Buddha.' answered Tanzan.
