= Kirigami (Soto Zen) =

Medieval Japanese Zen documents

The kirigami were esoteric documents of the Sōtō school in medieval Japan which

...reflect a creative use of traditional kōan records integrated with popular religious themes such as devotion to local gods and the exorcism of demonic spirits."

For instance,

Various kirigami present the deity of Hakusan as a form of Izanagi, of Kannon, or a dragon-king."

Some kirigami

...describe talismans that women had to carry or swallow to purify themselves from blood defilement when they attended religious ceremonies."

Kirigami were also

...'notes' or 'memos' transmitted from master to disciple together with oral or esoteric teachings; they included instructions in the various functions of a temple priest, including memorial services and necrologies, both of which were conducted with the explicit aim of perpetuating social discrimination."

Bernard Faure writes that the kirigami were

...documents whose diagrammatic aspect and ritual function bring to mind the prophetic scriptures (chanwei) of Confucian imperial ideology and Daoist talismans studied by Anna Seidel.

Steven Heine writes that,

...[the] tradition of using kirigami was widespread in diverse medieval apprenticeship programs."

== Sources ==
- Faure, Bernard (2003). The Power of Denial: Buddhism, Purity, and Gender. Princeton University Press. ISBN 978-0-691-09171-6.
- Faure, Bernard (2000). Visions of Power: Imagining Medieval Japanese Buddhism. Princeton University Press. ISBN 978-0-691-02941-2.
- Faure, Bernard (2003). Chan Buddhism in Ritual Context. Routledge. ISBN 978-0-415-29748-6. OCLC 51088107.
- Heine, Steven (2006). Did Dogen Go to China?: What He Wrote and When He Wrote It. Oxford University Press. ISBN 978-0-19-530570-8. OCLC 61253946.
- Heine, Steven (1999). Shifting Shape, Shaping Text: Philosophy and Folklore in the Fox Kōan. University of Hawaii Press. ISBN 978-0-8248-2197-5.
- Hubbard, Jamie; Swanson, Paul Loren (1997). Pruning the Bodhi Tree: The Storm Over Critical Buddhism. University of Hawaii Press. ISBN 978-0-8248-1949-1.
