= Blue Cliff Record =

Chan/Zen Buddhist text

The Blue Cliff Record (Chinese: 碧巖錄; pinyin: Bìyán Lù; Japanese: 碧巌録; rōmaji: Hekiganroku; Korean: 벽암록; romaja: Byeokamrok; Vietnamese: Bích nham lục) (Note: Full name: 佛果圜悟禪師碧嚴錄; alternatively known as 碧巖集) is a collection of Chan Buddhist kōans originally compiled in Song China in 1125, during the reign of Emperor Huizong, and then expanded into its present form by Chan master Yuanwu Keqin (1063–1135; Japanese pronunciation: Engo).

The book includes Yuanwu's annotations and commentary on 100 Verses on Old Cases (頌古百則), a compilation of 100 kōans collected by Xuedou Chongxian (980–1052; 雪竇重顯, Setcho). Xuedou selected 82 of these from the Song period work The Jingde Record of the Transmission of the Lamp, with the remainder selected from the Yunmen Guanglu (雲門廣録, Extensive Record of Yunmen Wenyan, 864–949).

== History ==
=== Name and origin ===
The Blue Cliff Record derives its name from the temple where Yuanwu Keqin wrote most of his commentaries, the Blue Cliff Cloister (碧巖院, Bìyán Yuàn) in Hunan. The work was originally called Xuedou's Juko (ju, verse; ko, old koans) before its Blue Cliff Record title was attributed.

Yuanwu first presented it as a series of lectures to his students between 1111 and 1117. It appears these lectures occurred during the traditional 90-day summer retreats, as can be seen from his introduction to the 100th Case, where he writes: "All summer I've been verbosely making up complications... and tripping up all the monks in the land." Written a hundred years before The Gateless Gate, the Blue Cliff Record contains appended verses to each koan, added by Xuedo to point out their hidden meaning. Yuanwu 's commentaries were added to tempt students trying to understand Zen conceptually and intellectually instead of by their own immediate experience.

The composite work consisting of the one hundred cases, along with poetry added by Xuedou and prose commentary by Yuanwu, is collectively known as the Blue Cliff Record.

=== Later developments ===
Yuanwu's successor, Dahui Zonggao (1089–1163), wrote many letters to lay students teaching the practice of concentrating on koans during meditation, but Dahui did not explain and analyze koans. Oral tradition holds that Dahui noticed students engaged in too much intellectual discourse on koans, and then burned the wooden blocks used to print the Blue Cliff Record to "rescue disciples from delusion".

The text was reconstituted only in the early 14th century by a layman, Zhang Mingyuan (張明遠, Chō Mei-en). One of Zhang's sons became ill during this time, and others believed that it was an omen meaning that Zhang should not have re-released the book. However, an elder named Feng Zizhen (馮子振) comforted Zhang and encouraged him for his work. Some of Yuanwu's capping phrases and possibly some of Xuedong's capping phrases were lost due to the incomplete source material available to Zhang.

On its republication, the Blue Cliff Record again became one of the most influential works of Chan/Zen literature.

=== Dogen and Japan ===
Another key legend regards Dōgen (1200–1253), who brought the Caodong school of Chan to Japan as the Sōtō tradition of Zen. After an extended visit to China for the purpose of studying Chan, on the night before his planned return to Japan, Dogen came across the Blue Cliff Record for the first time, and stayed up all night making a handwritten copy of the book. Given the size of the book, this story is most likely apocryphal; but Dogen is still credited with introducing the collection to Japan, where it had a wide circulation. The Blue Cliff Record became the central text in Japanese Zen by the Muromachi period of 1336 to 1573.

== Literary qualities ==
The Blue Cliff Record was a subtle and literary text, with wide-ranging philosophical implications, in contrast to the more straightforward nature of The Gateless Barrier. The Gateless Gate is normally studied before Blue Cliff Record because it is a shorter, simpler text, but all the cases in both texts are independent and could be studied in any sequence.

== List of chapters ==
Below is a list of the 100 cases (koans) in the Blue Cliff Record from Thomas Cleary's 1998 English translation of the Blue Cliff Record. Traditionally, the Blue Cliff Record is organized into 10 volumes, each containing 10 cases.

1. The Emperor Wu Questions Bodhidharma
2. The Ultimate Way Is without Difficulty
3. Master Ma Is Unwell
4. Deshan Carrying His Bundle
5. Xuefeng's Grain of Rice
6. Every Day Is a Good Day
7. Huichao Asks about the Buddha
8. Cuiyan's Eyebrows
9. Zhaozhou's Four Gates
10. The Phony Notice on Overcoming Demons
11. Gobblers of Dregs
12. Three Pounds of Flax
13. The School of Kāṇadeva
14. An Appropriate Statement
15. An Upside-Down Statement
16. The Man in the Weeds
17. The Living Meaning of Chan
18. The Seamless Monument
19. One Finger Chan
20. The Living Meaning of Chan
21. Lotus Flower, Lotus Leaves
22. The Turtle-Nosed Snake
23. The Summit of the Peak of Wonder
24. Guishan and Iron Grindstone Liu
25. The Hermit's Staff
26. Sitting Alone on the Mountain
27. The Body Exposed in the Autumn Wind
28. The Truth That's Never Been Spoken
29. It Goes Along With It
30. Big Radishes
31. Magu Carrying His Ringed Staff
32. Elder Ding Stands Motionless
33. Zifu's Circle
34. Where Do You Come From?
35. The Dialogue of Mañjuśrī and Wuzhuo
36. Roaming in the Mountains
37. There's Nothing in the World
38. The Workings of the Iron Ox
39. The Flowering Hedge
40. Like a Dream
41. One Who Has Died the Great Death Contents
42. Good Snowflakes
43. No Cold or Heat
44. Knowing How to Beat the Drum
45. Zhaozhou's Shirt
46. The Sound of Raindrops
47. Six Do Not Take It In
48. Overturning the Tea Kettle
49. The Golden Fish That Has Passed through the Net
50. Every Atom Samādhi
51. What Is It?
52. The Stone Bridge
53. Wild Ducks
54. Yunmen Extends Both Hands
55. Daowu's Condolence Call
56. One Arrow Smashes Three Barriers
57. The Stupid Oaf
58. Zhaozhou Can't Explain
59. Why Not Quote It Fully?
60. The Staff Changes into a Dragon
61. One Atom
62. Within There Is a Jewel
63. Nanquan Kills a Cat
64. Nanquan Questions Zhaozhou
65. An Outsider Questions the Buddha
66. Getting Huangchao's Sword
67. Great Adept Fu Expounds a Scripture
68. What's Your Name?
69. Nanquan's Circle
70. Guishan Attends Baizhang
71. You Shut Up Too
72. Baizhang Questions Yunyan
73. The Permutations of Assertion and Denial
74. Jinniu's Rice Pail
75. Wujiu's Unjust Beating
76. Have You Eaten?
77. Yunmen's Cake
78. Sixteen Bodhisattvas Bathe
79. All Sounds
80. A Newborn Baby
81. Shooting the Elk of Elks
82. The Stable Body of Reality
83. The Ancient Buddhas and the Pillars
84. Vimalakīrti's Door of Nonduality
85. A Tiger's Roar
86. The Kitchen Pantry and the Main Gate
87. Medicine and Disease Subdue Each Other
88. Three Invalids
89. The Hands and Eyes of Great Compassion
90. The Body of Wisdom
91. Yanguan's Rhinoceros
92. The Buddha Ascends the Seat
93. Daguang Does a Dance
94. Not Seeing
95. Three Poisons
96. Three Turning Words
97. The Diamond Sutra's Scornful Revilement
98. Tianping's Travels
99. The Ten Body Controller
100. Baling's Sword

== See also ==
- 101 Zen Stories
- Book of Equanimity
- Mondo
- Every day is a good day
- The Gateless Barrier
