= Chinese riddles =

Traditional Chinese language riddles

Chinese riddles stand in a tradition traceable to around the second century CE. They are partly noted for their use of elaborate visual puns on Chinese characters.

According to Timothy Wai Keung Chan, 'the Chinese riddle originates in far antiquity and reached its mature form around the Warring States Period (475–221 BCE)'. However, few riddles are attested in ancient Chinese literature, possibly because Chinese scholarship viewed the form as inappropriate to highbrow literature. The seminal literary historian Liu Xie, writing his Wenxin diaolong in the fifth century CE, situated the beginning of literary riddle-writing in Chinese in the Wei dynasty (220–65); he did not quote examples, but his dating is roughly consistent with the dating of one of the earliest surviving Chinese riddles, the 'Yellow Pongee Riddle'.

The posing and solving of riddles has long been an important part of the Chinese Lantern Festival; "the date of the origin of the lantern riddle is not definite, but according to Japanese writers it probably first became popular during the Northern Sung dynasty (960–1126), and became associated with the Feast of Lanterns during the 17th century".

== Terminology ==
In modern Chinese, the standard word for 'riddle' is mi (謎, literally "to bewilder"). Riddles are spoken of as having a mian (面, "surface", the question component of the riddle), and a di (底, "base", the answer component). Ancient Chinese terms for 'riddle' include yin (讔) and sou (廋), which both mean "hidden".

== Character riddles ==
The Chinese riddle-tradition makes much use of visual puns on Chinese characters. One example is the riddle "千 里 会 千 金"; these characters respectively mean 'thousand kilometre meet thousand gold'.

1. The first stage of solving the riddle is verbal:
  1. In Chinese culture, "it is said that a good horse can run thousands of kilometers per day", so "千 里" (thousand kilometer) is resolved as "马" (horse).
  2. Meanwhile, because "a daughter is very important in the family", in Chinese culture it is possible to resolve "千 金" (thousand gold) as "女" (daughter).
2. The second stage of solving the riddle is visual: combining the radical "马" (horse) with the radical "女" (daughter) produces the character "妈" (mother).

Thus the answer to "thousand kilometres meet thousand gold" is "妈" (mother).

=== Precursors to character riddles ===
Although character riddles are not attested until around the second century CE, other enigmatic writings are attested from as early as the Han dynasty, which began in 206 BCE. These take the form of riddle-like prophecies. One example is

鬼在山﹐
禾女運﹐
王天下。

Translation:

When the ghost is on the mountain,
When the millet is transported by women,
[They] will become rulers of the empire.

This cryptic text can be explained by combining the three characters of the first line into the single graph wei (巍), which is used interchangeably with (魏). Among its meanings is the state of Cao Wei; thus the text can be read as an enigma whose solution is that Cao Wei will overcome the Han dynasty and take over its empire.

=== Early character riddles ===
Reputedly the earliest surviving example of a character riddle is the 'Yellow Pongee Riddle', a famous text sometimes attributed to the second-century CE scholar Cai Yong, but at any rate thought to originate no later than the early fourth century. Its earliest surviving attestation is on a piece of pongee silk held in Liaoning Provincial Museum. The riddle runs 'Yellow silk, young maiden; maternal grandchild, shredded pickle in sauce, mortar' (黃絹幼婦外孫臼). The solution, first attested in the third-century Dianlüe (which does not, however, quote the riddle itself), is 'utterly wonderful, lovely, words!'. This is explained in the fifth-century Shishuo xinyu, which depicts the Eastern Han chancellor Cao Cao saying '"Yellow pongee" is colored silk (sesi 色絲), which, combined in one character, is jue 絕, "utterly". "Youthful woman" is young maiden (shaonü 少女), which, combined in one character, is miao 妙, "wonderful". "Maternal grandson" is a daughter's son (nüzi 女子), which, combined in one character, is hao 好, "lovely". "Ground in a mortar" is to suffer hardship (shouxin 受辛), which, combined in one character, is ci 辭, "words". The whole thing thus means: "utterly wonderful, lovely words"'. Because the riddle was believed to have been composed as part of a memorial to a second-century girl called Cao E ('Maiden Cao'), character riddles of this kind have come to be known as 'Cao E Type' riddles (Cao E ge 格).

== Riddles in Zen Buddhist education ==
A distinctive kind of riddle known in English as the kōan (Chinese: 公案; pinyin: gōng'àn) developed as a teaching technique in Zen Buddhism in the Tang dynasty (618–907), with most examples surviving from the eleventh to thirteenth centuries. In this tradition, the answer to the riddle is to be established through years of meditation, informed by Zen thought, as part of a process of seeking enlightenment. To give a later Japanese example of the form by Hakuin Ekaku (1686–1769), 'two hands clap and there is a sound. What is the sound of one hand?' (隻手声あり、その声を聞け). In the exposition of Victor Hori,

in the beginning a monk first thinks a kōan is an inert object upon which to focus attention; after a long period of consecutive repetition, one realizes that the kōan is also a dynamic activity, the very activity of seeking an answer to the kōan. The kōan is both the object being sought and the relentless seeking itself. In a kōan, the self sees the self not directly but under the guise of the kōan ... When one realizes ("makes real") this identity, then two hands have become one. The practitioner becomes the kōan that he or she is trying to understand. That is the sound of one hand.

== Modern folk-riddles ==
In the twentieth century, thousands of Chinese riddles and similar enigmas have been collected, capitalising on the large number of homophones in Chinese. Examples of folk-riddles include:

- There is a small vessel filled with sauce, one vessel holding two different kinds. (Egg)
- Washing makes it more and more dirty; it is cleaner without washing. (Water)
- There is a big rooster. When it sees someone, then it makes a bow. (Tea pot)
- A certain family lived in two courts with many children in each, and, strange to say, the greater were less than the lesser and the less were more than the greater. (Abacus)
- When I go out, I am thick and fat. When I come home, I am meager like a skeleton. Then I am put in a corner against the wall and my tears flow freely. (Umbrella)
- When you use it you throw it away, and when you do not use it you bring it back. (Anchor)

== Editions and translations ==
- Chinese Riddles: Chinese Text, Full Romanisation, Full Vocabulary and Full Translations, ed. and trans. by William Dolby, Chinese culture series, 21 (Edinburgh: Carreg Publishers, 2007).
