= Kyōgai =

Concept in Zen Buddhism

Japanese name
- Kanji: 境界
Transcriptions
- Romanization: Kyōgai

Kyōgai (Japanese: 境界) is a concept in Zen Buddhism for a person's state of mind. Kyōgai is a Japanese word and does not have a direct English translation, but it is often variously described as a person's state of being, or more specifically their "consciousness" or "behavior" or "experience". Though not an accurate definition, the literal translation of the word kyōgai into English is "boundary", and the origin of the word Kyōgai comes from the Pali word gocara (Pali: गोच) and the Sanskrit word Viśayā (Sanskrit: विषया), specifically in their contexts as a pasture where animals graze and the boundary of that pasture.

The kyōgai is a private experience, such that one person's kyōgai will be different from another's, and a person's kyōgai changes with time and experience. The term is also used to describe a person's behavior or attitude, for example a routine action done by a person or a person's way of doing things is described as their kyōgai.

In the Rinzai school especially, it is a person's kyōgai that is judged when being tested with kōans, as opposed to an intellectual understanding of a fixed answer to the kōan itself.

The term can also less commonly refer to a shared viewpoint, such as a Western kyōgai being used to describe the experiences and understanding of the world through the lens of a person in the Western world.
