= Koan =

Short instructive text in some Buddhist practices

A kōan (/ˈkoʊæn, -ɑːn/ KOH-a(h)n; Japanese: 公案; Chinese: 公案; pinyin: gōng'àn [kʊ́ŋ ân]; Korean: 화두; Vietnamese: công án) is a story, dialogue, question, or statement from Chinese Chan Buddhist lore, supplemented with commentaries, that is used in Chan, Zen, Seon and Thiền Buddhist practice in different ways. The main goal of kōan practice in Zen is to achieve kenshō (Chinese: jianxing 見性), to see or recognize one's buddha-nature.

Extended study of kōan literature as well as meditation (zazen) on a kōan is a major feature of modern Rinzai Zen. They are also studied in the Sōtō school of Zen to a lesser extent. In Chinese Chan and Korean Seon Buddhism, meditating on a huatou, a key phrase of a kōan, is also a major Zen meditation method.

== Etymology ==
The Japanese word kōan is the Sino-Japanese pronunciation of the Chinese word gōng'àn 公案 (or gūng'on in Cantonese). According to the Yuan dynasty Zen master Zhongfeng Mingben (中峰明本 1263–1323), gōng'àn originated as an abbreviation of gōngfǔ zhī àndú (公府之案牘, Japanese kōfu no antoku), which referred to a "public record" or the "case records of a public law court" in Tang dynasty China. (Note: Assertions that the literal meaning of kung-an is the table, desk, or bench of a magistrate appear on page 18 of Foulk (2000). See also McRae (2003, pp. 172–173 note 16).) Kōan/gong'an thus serves as a metaphor for principles of reality beyond the private or subjective opinion of one person, and a teacher may test the student's ability to recognize and understand that principle.

Commentaries in kōan collections bear some similarity to judicial decisions that cite and sometimes modify precedents. One authority writes that the literal meaning of kōan is the 'table' or 'bench' an of a 'magistrate' or 'judge' kung. Thus Gong'an was a metonym in which an article of furniture involved in setting legal precedents came to stand for such precedents. For example, Di Gong'an (狄公案) is the Chinese title of Celebrated Cases of Judge Dee, the famous Chinese detective novel based on a historical Tang dynasty judge. Similarly, Zen kōan collections are public records of the notable sayings and actions of Zen masters and disciples attempting to pass on their teachings.

== Doctrinal background ==
The popular Western understanding sees kōan as referring to an unanswerable question or a meaningless or absurd statement. However, in Zen practice, a kōan is not meaningless, and not a riddle or a puzzle. Teachers do expect students to present an appropriate response when asked about a kōan. According to Hori, a central theme of many kōan is the 'identity of opposites':

[K]ōan after kōan explores the theme of nonduality. Hakuin's well-known kōan, "Two hands clap and there is a sound, what is the sound of one hand?" is clearly about two and one. The kōan asks, you know what duality is, now what is nonduality? In "What is your original face before your mother and father were born?" the phrase "father and mother" alludes to duality. This is obvious to someone versed in the Chinese tradition, where so much philosophical thought is presented in the imagery of paired opposites. The phrase "your original face" alludes to the original nonduality.

Comparable statements are: "Look at the flower and the flower also looks"; "Guest and host interchange". Kōan are also understood as pointers to an unmediated "Pure Consciousness", devoid of cognitive activity. Victor Hori criticizes this understanding:

[A] pure consciousness without concepts, if there could be such a thing, would be a booming, buzzing confusion, a sensory field of flashes of light, unidentifiable sounds, ambiguous shapes, color patches without significance. This is not the consciousness of the enlightened Zen master.

== Gong'an in China ==
=== The "public cases" of the old masters ===
Gong'an literature developed at some point in between the late Tang dynasty (10th century) to the Song dynasty (960–1279), though the details are unclear. They arose out of the collections of the recorded sayings of Chan masters and "transmission" texts like the Transmission of the Lamp. These sources contained numerous stories of famous past Chan masters which were used to educate Chan/Zen students. According to Morten Schlütter "it is not clear exactly when the practice of commenting on old gongan cases started, but the earliest Chan masters to have such commentaries included in the recorded sayings attributed to them appear to be Yunmen Wenyan and Fenyang Shanzhao (947–1024)."

According to Robert Buswell, the gong'an tradition "can be viewed as the products of an internal dynamic within Chan that began in the T'ang and climaxed in the Sung." By the beginning of the Song era, Chan masters were known to use these stories in their sermons, as well as to comment on them and to use them to challenge their students.

Schlütter also writes:

[M]uch of the material in the recorded sayings collections of individual Song Chan masters consists of the master quoting ("raising"; ju) a story about a famous past Chan figure's encounter with disciples or other interlocutors and then offering his own comments on it. The stories held up for comment came to be referred to as gongan, "public cases," or guze, "old model cases," both terms borrowed, it would seem, from the language of law.

Originally, such a story was only considered a gong'an when it was commented upon by another Chan master, i.e. when it was used as a "case" study for enlightenment. This practice of commenting on the words and deeds of past masters also served to confirm the master's position as an awakened master in a lineage of awakened masters of the past.

According to Schlütter, these stories were also used "to challenge Chan students to demonstrate their insights: a Chan master would cite a story about a famous master and then demand that his students comment." Later on, certain questions (like: "Why did Bodhidharma come from the West?") developed independently from the traditional stories and were used in the same fashion. Schlütter also notes that "most commonly used gongan in the Song originally came from the influential Transmission of the Lamp, although the subsequent transmission histories also became sources of gongan."

Over time, a whole literary genre of gong'an collection and commentary developed which was influenced by "educated literati" of the Song era. These collections included quotations of encounter-dialogue passages (the "cases", gong'an) with a master's comment on the case attached. When a prose comment was added, the genre was called niangu ('picking up the old ones'), and when poems were used to comment, the genre was termed songgu ('eulogizing the old ones'). Further commentaries would then be written by later figures on these initial comments, leading to quite complex and layered texts.

The style of these Song-era Zen texts was influenced by many Chinese literary conventions and the style of "literary games" (competitions involving improvised poetry). Common literary devices included:

1. The extensive use of allusions, which create a feeling of disconnection with the main theme;
2. Indirect references, such as titling a poem with one topic and composing a verse that seems on the surface to be totally unrelated;
3. Inventive wordplay based on the fact that hanzi (Chinese characters) are homophonic and convey multiple, often complementary or contradictory meanings;
4. Linking the verses in a sustained string based on hidden points of connection or continuity, such as seasonal imagery or references to myths and legends.

There were dangers involved in such a highly literary approach, such as ascribing specific meanings to the cases, or becoming too involved in book learning. Dahui Zonggao is even said to have burned the woodblocks of the Blue Cliff Record, for the hindrance it had become to the study of Chan by his students.

=== "Observing the phrase" ===
During the late Song dynasty (11th–12th century), the practice of assigning specific gōng'àn to students for contemplation had become quite common and some sources contain examples of Zen masters (e.g. Touzi Yiqing) who became enlightened through contemplating a gōng'àn.

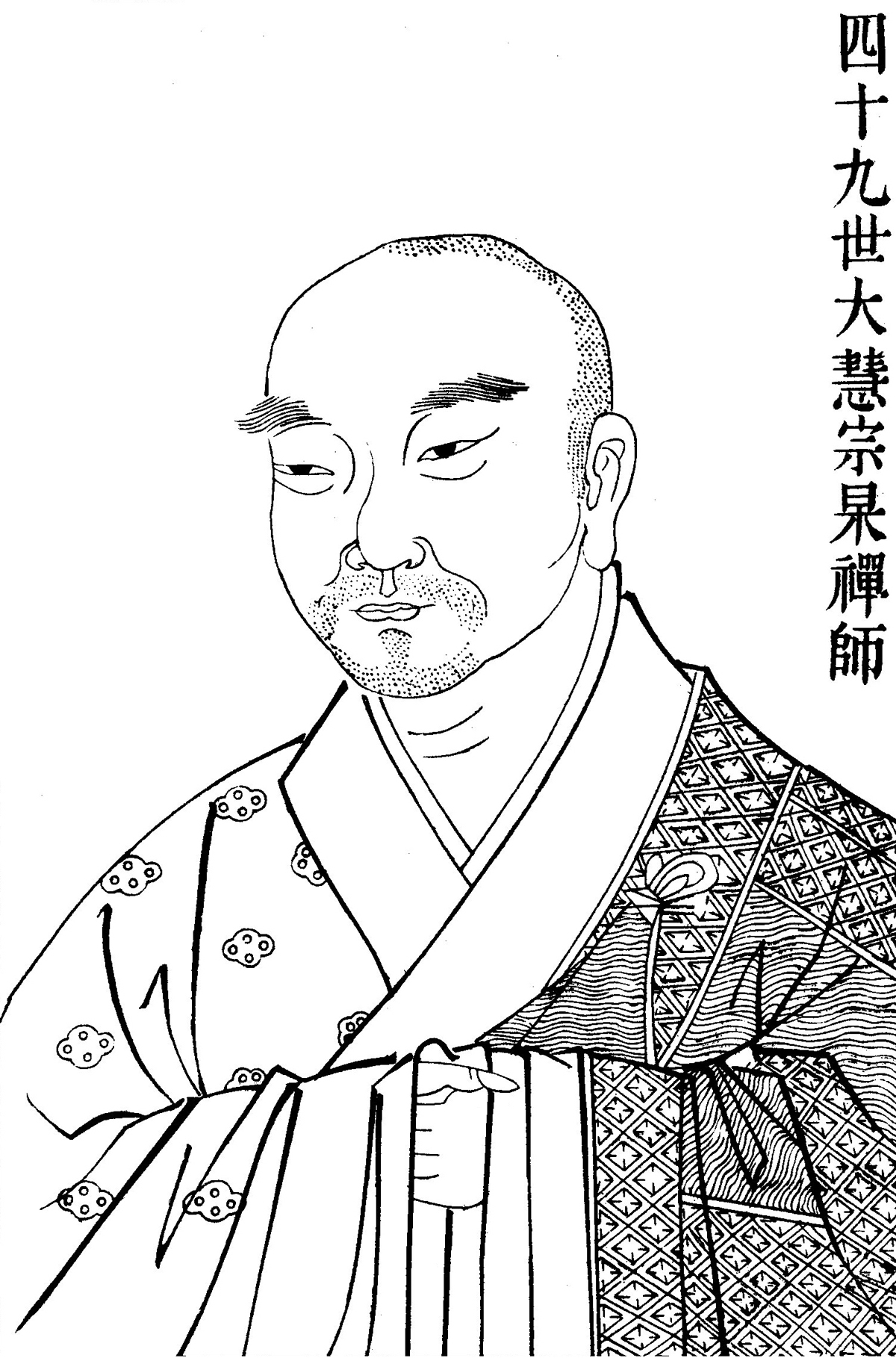
Dahui Zonggao (1089-1163)

Thus, by the time of Dahui Zonggao (1089–1163), (Note: Chinese: 大慧宗杲; Wade–Giles: Ta-hui Tsung-kao; Japanese: Daie Sōkō) this practice was well established. Dahui promoted and popularized the practice extensively, under the name of "observing the phrase zen" (kanhua chan). In this practice, students were to observe (kan) or concentrate on a single word or phrase (huatou), such as the famous mu of the mu-kōan, and develop a sense of "great doubt" within until this ball of doubt "shattered", leading to enlightenment. Dahui's invention was aimed at balancing the insight, developed by reflection on the teachings, with developing śamatha, calmness of mind.

This idea of observing a key phrase or word was Dahui's unique contribution, since the earlier method of gōng'àn contemplation never taught the focusing on a single word, nor did it teach to develop a "ball of doubt that builds up before finally shattering." According to Wright, instead of focusing on the full narrative of a kōan, Dahui promoted "intense focus on one critical phrase, generally one word or element at the climax of the kōan."

Dahui also taught that meditation on just one huatou of a single gong'an was enough to achieve enlightenment, since penetrating one gong'an was penetrating into all of them. He went even further, arguing that this new meditation technique was the only way of achieving enlightenment for Chan practitioners of his day. Thus, Schlütter writes that "in this insistence, he was unusual among the Song Chan masters, who generally tended to take a rather inclusive view of Buddhist practice. It is therefore fair to say that Dahui not only developed a new contemplative technique, he also invented a whole new kind of Chan in the process." Whatever the case, Dahui was extremely influential in shaping the development of the Linji school in the Song.

Dale S. Wright also writes that Dahui:

[...] maintained that the hua-t'ou had no meaning and that any intellectualization, any conceptual thinking at all, would obstruct the possibility of break-through. As a corollary to this, Ta-hui warned that the intellectuals who in his day were the ones most interested in kōan meditation would be the least likely to succeed at it, given their tendency to think. His advice to them, therefore, was to cease completely any effort to resolve the kōan and "to give up the conceit that they have the intellectual tools that would allow them to understand it." The primary effort required in this enterprise was a negative one, "nonconceptualization,"...

As Robert Buswell explains, this emphasis on non-conceptual meditation on a gong'an meant that "there is nothing that need be developed; all the student must do is simply renounce both the hope that there is something that can be achieved through the practice as well as the conceit that he will achieve that result."

Wright argues that since "the narrative structure of the kōan was eliminated in the focus on a single point", that is the hua-t'ou (which was said to have no meaning), such a practice became a śamatha-like zazen practice (which even resembles Caodong silent illumination), even if this was never acknowledged by the masters of the Linji school in the Song. Furthermore, Wright also argues that this practice was anti-intellectual since all learning was to be renounced in the practice of kanhua chan. According to Wright, this development left Chinese Chan vulnerable to criticisms by a resurgent neo-Confucianism.

According to Mario Poceski, although Dahui's kanhua Chan (in which one focuses on a huatou) purports to be a sudden method, it essentially consists of a process of gradually perfecting concentration. Poceski also observes the role the kanhua technique played in standardizing Chan practice. He argues that this contributed to the routinization of the tradition, resulting in a loss of some of the more open and creative aspects of earlier Chan.

=== The Chan master's role ===
According to Kasulis, the rise of gōng'àn contemplation in Song-era Zen led to a greater emphasis on the interaction between master and student, which came to be identified as the essence of enlightenment, since "its verification was always interpersonal. In effect, enlightenment came to be understood not so much as an insight, but as a way of acting in the world with other people."

This mutual inquiry of past cases gave Zen students a role model and a sense of belonging to a spiritual family since "one looked at the enlightened activities of one's lineal forebears in order to understand one's own identity." (Note: This role-taking is described by the Swedish psychologist of religion Hjalmar Sundén, though McRae does not seem to be aware of this.) The practice also served to confirm an individual's enlightenment and authority in a specific lineage or school. This formal authorization or confirmation (Chinese: 印可, Japanese: inka, Korean: inga) was given by their teacher and was often part of a process of "dharma transmission" (Chinese: 傳法) in a specific lineage. This formal act placed the "confirmed" Chan master in a special unique position as an interpreter and guide to the gong'an.

The importance of the teacher student relationship is seen in modern Japanese kōan training which always requires an authorized teacher (rōshi or oshō) in a specific lineage who has the ability to judge a disciple's understanding and expression of a gōng'àn. In the Rinzai Zen school, which uses kōan extensively, the teacher certification process includes an appraisal of proficiency in using that school's extensive kōan curriculum. According to Barbara O'Brien, the practice of going to a private interview with one's Zen master (sanzen) where one has to prove one's understanding of kōan "is the real point of the whole exercise".

=== Chinese gōng'àn collections ===
Some of the key Song-era gong'an collections are:

- The Blue Cliff Record (Chinese: 碧巖錄; Japanese: Hekiganroku) is a collection of 100 kōan compiled in 1125 by Yuanwu Keqin (圜悟克勤 1063–1135), mostly drawn from earlier "transmission" stories.
- The Book of Equanimity or Book of Serenity (Chinese: 從容録; Japanese: 従容録, romanized: Shōyōroku) is a collection of 100 kōan by Hongzhi Zhengjue (Chinese: 宏智正覺; Japanese: Wanshi Shōgaku) (1091–1157), compiled with commentaries by Wansong Xingxiu (1166–1246).
- The Gateless Gate (Chinese: 無門關 Wumenguan; Japanese: Mumonkan) is a collection of 48 kōan and commentaries published in 1228 by Chinese monk Wumen (無門 c. 1183–1260). The title may be more accurately rendered as Gateless Barrier or Gateless Checkpoint. Five kōan in the collection derive from the sayings and doings of Zhaozhou Congshen (transliterated as Chao-chou in Wade–Giles and pronounced Jōshū in Japanese).
- The Zhengfayan zang (正法眼藏, "Treasury of the true dharma eye", Japanese: Shōbōgenzō) is a collection of kōan and dialogues compiled between 1147 and 1150 by Dahui Zonggao. Dahui's Treasury is composed of three scrolls prefaced by three short introductory pieces.
- The Zongmen liandeng huiyao (宗門聯燈會要) was compiled in 1183 by Huiweng Wuming (晦翁悟明) (n.d.), three generations after Dahui in the same line; the sermon is found in zh 20 (x 79: 173a).

These texts mostly draw and develop stories which are found in other sources, mainly the Anthology of the Patriarchal Hall (Chinese Zǔtángjí, mid-10th century), and the hagiographical Jingde Record of the Transmission of the Lamp (Chinese Jǐngdé Chuándēnglù, early 11th century).

=== After the Song era ===
Zhongfeng Mingben (1263–1323), a Chinese Chan master who lived at the beginning of the Yuan Dynasty, revitalized the Chinese Linji school. Zhongfeng put a strong emphasis on the use of gong'an, seeing them as a "work of literature [that] should be used as objective, universal standards to test the insight of monks who aspired to be recognized as Ch'an masters". He also promoted Dahui's famous kanhua chan method of meditating on a huatou and influenced several Japanese Rinzai masters of the time who came to China to study with him, including Kosen Ingen, Kohō Kakumyō, Jakushitsu Genkō (1290–1367).

According to Zhongfeng:

The koans do not represent the private opinion of a single man, but rather the hundreds and thousands of bodhisattvas of the three realms and ten directions. This principle accords with the spiritual source, tallies with the mysterious meaning, destroys birth-and-death, and transcends the passions. It cannot be understood by logic; it cannot be transmitted in words; it cannot be explained in writing; it cannot be measured by reason. It is like the poisoned drum that kills all who hear it, or like a great fire that consumes all who come near it. What is called "the special transmission of the Vulture Peak" was the transmission of this; what is called the "direct pointing of Bodhidharma at Shao-lin-ssu" is this.

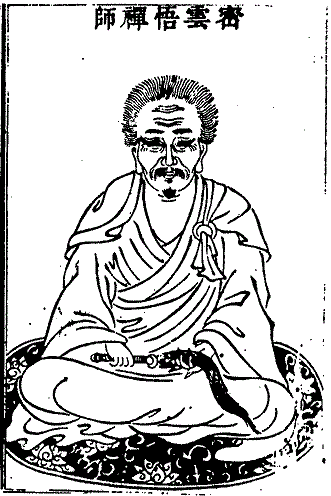
Chan Master Miyun Yuanwu

In later periods like the Ming dynasty, Chinese Chan developed in different directions, such as incorporating Pure Land elements and the re-introduction of an emphasis on the study of scripture.

However, gong'an meditation was still practiced in the Linji lineages. During the Ming, Miyun Yuanwu (1566–1642) was a successful promoter of the Linji school's gong'an methods, emphasizing vigorous master disciple encounters which made use of shouting and beating in imitation of classic gong'an stories. Yuanwu's efforts to revive the Linji tradition were so successful that according to Marcus Bingenheimer, "Miyun's Tiantong branch 天童派 of the Linji School became the dominant Chan lineage in China and beyond" (c. 17th century). He led numerous communities of thousands of monks and confirmed twelve dharma heirs.

His teachings also influenced Japanese Zen since his student Yinyuan Longqi (Japanese: Ingen Ryūki, 1592–1673) later founded the Ōbaku school in Japan. This lineage also spread the Linji gong'an teachings to Vietnam, mainly through the efforts of Yuanshao (元韶, 1648–1728).

== Modern Chinese Chan and Korean Seon ==
In the modern period, the practice of meditating on the critical phrase (huatou) of a gong'an is still taught and some Chinese Chan figures like Sheng Yen and Xuyun taught the practice and wrote on it.

Modern Chinese Chan and Korean Seon generally follow the method taught by Dahui, which emphasizes meditation on a huatou ('critical phrase', 'word head'). In this method one repeats the phrase over and over again and inquires into it while in meditation (sitting or walking) as well as in daily activities. In this mainland tradition of huatou practice, also called kanhua, 'reflection on the kōan', a fragment of a kōan, such as mu, or a "what is"-question is used by focusing on this fragment and repeating it over and over again.

In this tradition one generally contemplates one such phrase for an extended period of time, going deeper and deeper into it, instead of going through an extended curriculum as in Japanese Rinzai. A student may be assigned only one huatou for their whole life. The focus of this contemplation is on generating the sense of "great doubt" and on having faith in the Dharma and the practice. According to Ford the huatou "becomes a touchstone of our practice: it is a place to put our doubt, to cultivate great doubt, to allow the revelation of great faith, and to focus our great energy."

Xuyun wrote:

The important thing is to stick to Hua Tou at all times, when walking, lying, or standing. From morning to night observing Hua Tou vividly and clearly, until it appears in your mind like the autumn moon reflected limpidly in quiet water. If you practice this way, you can be assured of reaching the state of Enlightenment.

Examples of huatou which are used in meditation include: "What is this?"; "What was the original face before my father and mother were born?"; "Who is dragging this corpse about?"; and "Who am I?".

Another popular practice in Chinese Chan is using the nianfo (repetition of Amitabha Buddha's name) as a gōng'àn practice. This method of "Nianfo Chan" (念佛禪) was promoted in the modern era by Xuyun and relies on repeating the Buddha's name while also asking "who is reciting?". The practice of using nianfo in a gōng'àn like fashion is also found in the Japanese Ōbaku school and was taught by their founding masters (including Yinyuan, i.e. Ingen), indicating that this method dates at least as far back as the Ming dynasty.

The modern Korean master Seung Sahn developed his own curriculum of multiple kōan in his Kwan Um School of Zen, but this was a modern development unheard of in Korean Seon.

== Kōan in Japan ==
=== The introduction of kōan ===
When the Chan tradition was established in Japan in the 12th century, both Rinzai and Sōtō, took over the use of kōan study and commenting. In Sōtō-Zen, kōan commentary was not linked to seated meditation. Japanese monks had to master the Chinese language and specific expressions used in the kōan training. The desired "spontaneity" expressed by enlightened masters required a thorough study of Chinese language and poetry. Japanese Zen imitated the Chinese "syntax and stereotyped norms".

During the Kamakura period, the officially recognized Rinzai monasteries belonging to the Gozan (Five Mountain System) were key centers for the study of kōan. Senior monks in these monasteries were supposed to compose Chinese verse in a complex style of matched counterpoints known as bienli wen. It took a lot of literary and intellectual skills for a monk to succeed in this system.

The Rinka monasteries, the provincial temples which were under less direct state control, laid less stress on the correct command of Chinese verse. These monasteries developed "more accessible methods of kōan instruction". It had three features:

1. A standardized kōan curriculum;
2. A standardized set of answers based on stereotypes Chinese sayings;
3. A standardized method of secretly guiding students through the curriculum of kōan and answers.

By standardizing the kōan curriculum every generation of students proceeded to the same series of kōan. Students had to memorize a set number of stereotyped sayings, agyō, 'appended words'. The proper series of responses for each kōan were taught by the master in private instruction sessions to selected individual students who would inherit the dharma lineage.

The development of Rinzai kōan curriculums occurred in various stages. According to Eshin Nishimura, Japanese Rinzai-masters like Enni-bennen (圓爾辨圓) (1202–1280) and Nampo-jyōmain (南浦紹明) (1235–1308) had already divided the Chinese kōan into three groups namely richi ('ultimate truth'), kikan ('skillful method') and kōjyon ('non-attachment'). (Note: Eshin Nishimura, Practical Principles of Hakuin Zen) Musō Soseki (1275–1351) further developed the use of kōan. Despite belonging to the Rinzai-school, Musō Soseki also made extensive use of richi (teaching), explaining the sutras, instead of kikan (kōan). According to Musō Soseki, both are upaya, 'skillful means' meant to educate students. Musō Soseki called both shōkogyu, 'little jewels', tools to help the student to attain satori. (Note: The term shōkogyu comes from a Chinese poem in which a lady calls the attendant using the word xiaoyu, Japanese shōkogyu, to warn her lover. The poem figures in an interaction between Wuzi Fayan (1024–1104) and his student Yuanwu Keqin, the teacher of Dahui Zonggao. Yüan-wu was assigned the kōan "The verbal and the nonverbal are like vines clinging to a tree". Yuanwu gained satori with the phrase "She keeps calling out to [her maid] Xiaoyu although there is nothing the matter. It is only because she knows Tanlang [her lover] will hear her voice". The same kōan was assigned to Dahui Zonggao.)

In the 18th century, the Rinzai school became dominated by the legacy of Hakuin, who laid a strong emphasis on kōan study as a means to gain kensho, but also not to get stuck in this initial insight, and to develop a compassionate, selfless attitude. After Hakuin, most Rinzai monasteries followed the teachings of his lineage on kōan practice. Kōan study was also further systematized in a standard sequence of kōan that the student had to pass and work through step by step. There are two curricula used in Rinzai, derived from two dharma-heirs of Gasan: the Takuju curriculum, and the Inzan curriculum. Both curricula have standardized answers.

=== Rinzai school ===
Kōan practice is particularly important among Japanese practitioners of the Rinzai school. Japanese Rinzai uses extensive kōan-curricula, checking questions, and jakogo ('capping phrases', quotations from Chinese poetry) in its use of koans,

Koan practice starts with the shokan, or 'first barrier', usually the mu-kōan or the question "What is the sound of one hand?". After having attained kensho, students continue their practice investigating subsequent kōan. In the Takuju-school, after breakthrough students work through the Gateless Gate (Mumonkan), the Blue Cliff Record (Hekigan-roku), the Entangling Vines (Shumon Kattoshu), and the Collection of Wings of the Blackbird (鴆羽集, Chin'u shū). The Inzan-school uses its own internally generated list of kōan.

==== Kōan curricula ====
In Rinzai a gradual succession of kōan is studied. There are two general branches of curricula used within Rinzai, the Takuju curriculum, and the Inzan curriculum. However, there are a number of sub-branches of these, and additional variations of curriculum often exist between individual teaching lines which can reflect the recorded experiences of a particular lineage's members. Kōan curricula are, in fact, subject to continued accretion and evolution over time, and thus are best considered living traditions of practice rather than set programs of study.

While Hakuin only refers to break-through kōan, and "difficult to pass" kōan to sharpen and refine the initial insight and foster compassion, Hakuin's descendants developed a fivefold classification system:

1. Hosshin, dharma-body kōan, are used to awaken the first insight into sunyata. They reveal the dharmakaya, or Fundamental. They introduce "the undifferentitated and the unconditional".
2. Kikan, dynamic action kōan, help to understand the phenomenal world as seen from the awakened point of view; where hosshin kōan represent tai, substance, kikan kōan represent yu, function.
3. Gonsen, explication of word kōan, aid to the understanding of the recorded sayings of the old masters. They show how the Fundamental, though not depending on words, is nevertheless expressed in words, without getting stuck to words.
4. Hachi Nanto, eight "difficult to pass" kōan. There are various explanations for this category, one being that these kōan cut off clinging to the previous attainment. They create another Great Doubt, which shatters the self attained through satori. It is uncertain which are exactly those eight kōan. Hori gives various sources, which altogether give ten hachi nanto kōan:
  - Miura and Sasaki:
    - Nansen's Flower (Hekigan-roku Case 40) (Note: See here for the kōan, and here for commentaries.)
    - A Buffalo Passes the Window (Mumonkan Case 38) (Note: Eshin Nishimura, PRACTICAL PRINCIPLE OF HAKUIN ZEN: "A confidence that there is still one more small step (sasi-koujyouno-ichijyakusu (些子向上の一著子)) remains even after you finish passing through all those patriarchal gates.")
    - Sōzan's Memorial Tower (Kattō-shō Case 140)
    - Suigan's Eyebrows (Hekigan-roku Case 8)
    - Enkan's Rhinoceros Fan (Hekigan-roku Case 91)
  - Shimano:
    - The Old Woman Burns the Hut (Kattō-shō Case 162)
  - Asahina Sōgen:
    - Goso Hōen's "Hakuun Said 'Not Yet'" (Kattō-shō Case 269)
    - Shuzan's Main Cable (Kattō-shō Case 280).
  - Akizuki:
    - Nansen Has Died (Kattō-shō Case 282)
    - Kenpō's Three Illnesses (Kattō-shō Case 17).
5. Goi jujukin kōan, the Five Ranks of Tozan and the Ten Grave Precepts.

According to Akizuki there was an older classification system, in which the fifth category was Kojo, 'Directed upwards'. This category too was meant to rid the monk of any "stink of Zen". The very advanced practitioner may also receive the Matsugo no rokan, "The last barrier", and Saigo no ikketsu, "The final confirmation". "The last barrier" is given when one left the training hall, for example "Sum up all of the records of Rinzai in one word!" It is not meant to be solved immediately, but to be carried around in order to keep practising. "The final confirmation" may be another word for the same kind of kōan. Shin'ichi Hisamatsu gave "If nothing what you do will do, then what will you do?" as an 'unanswerable' question, which keeps nagging on premature certainty.

==== The breakthrough-kōan ====
In the Rinzai school, the Sanbo Kyodan, and the White Plum Asanga, kōan practice starts with the assignment of a hosshi or "break-through kōan", usually the mu-kōan or "the sound of one hand". Students are instructed to concentrate on the "word-head", like the phrase mu. In the Wumenguan (Mumonkan), public case No. 1 ("Zhaozhou's Dog"), Wumen (Mumon) wrote:

[C]oncentrate yourself into this 'Wú' [...] making your whole body one great inquiry. Day and night work intently at it. Do not attempt nihilistic or dualistic interpretations.

Arousing this great inquiry or "Great Doubt" is an essential element of kōan practice. It builds up "strong internal pressure (gidan), never stopping knocking from within at the door of [the] mind, demanding to be resolved". To illustrate the enormous concentration required in kōan meditation, Zen Master Wumen commented:

It is like swallowing a red-hot iron ball. You try to vomit it out, but you can't.

Analysing the kōan for its literal meaning will not lead to insight, though understanding the context from which kōan emerged can make them more intelligible. For example, when a monk asked Zhaozhou (Joshu) "does a dog have Buddha-nature or not?", the monk was referring to the understanding of the teachings on Buddha-nature, which were understood in the Chinese context of absolute and relative reality. (Note: The controversy over whether all beings have the potential for enlightenment is even older. Vigorous controversy still surrounds the matter of Buddha nature. See "Tao-sheng's Theory of Sudden Enlightenment", Whalen Lai, in Sudden and Gradual (subtitle) Approaches to Enlightenment in Chinese Thought, p. 173 and 191. The latter page documents how in 429 or thereabouts (more than 400 years before Zhaozhou), Tao-sheng was expelled from the Buddhist monastic community for defending the idea that incorrigible persons (icchantika) do indeed have Buddha-nature (fo-hsing).)

==== Kensho ====
The continuous pondering of the break-through kōan (shokan) or Hua Tou, "word head", leads to kensho, an initial insight into "seeing the (Buddha-)nature.

The aim of the break-through kōan is to see the "nonduality of subject and object":

The monk himself in his seeking is the kōan. Realization of this is the insight; the response to the kōan [...] Subject and object – this is two hands clapping. When the monk realizes that the kōan is not merely an object of consciousness but is also he himself as the activity of seeking an answer to the kōan, then subject and object are no longer separate and distinct [...] This is one hand clapping (sic).

Various accounts can be found which describe "becoming one" with the kōan and the resulting breakthrough:

I was dead tired. That evening when I tried to settle down to sleep, the instant I laid my head on the pillow, I saw: "Ah, this outbreath is Mu!" Then: the in-breath too is Mu!" Next breath, too: Mu! Next breath: Mu, Mu! "Mu, a whole sequence of Mu! Croak, croak; meow, meow – these too are Mu! The bedding, the wall, the column, the sliding-door – these too are Mu! This, that and everything is Mu! Ha ha! Ha ha ha ha Ha! that roshi is a rascal! He's always tricking people with his 'Mu, Mu, Mu'!... (Note: Maura O'Halloran also gives an account of herself becoming mu.)

However, the use of the mu-kōan has also been criticised. According to Ama Samy, the main aim is merely to "'become one' with the kōan". Showing to have 'become one' with the first kōan is enough to pass the first kōan. According to Samy, this is not equal to prajna:

The one-pointed, non-intellectual concentration on the hua-t'ou (or Mu) is a pressure-cooker tactic, a reduction to a technique which can produce some psychic experiences. These methods and techniques are forced efforts which can even run on auto-pilot. They can produce experiences but not prajna wisdom. Some speak of 'investigating' the hua-t'ou, but it is rather a matter of concentration, which sometimes can provide insights, yet no more than that.

==== Testing insight – or learning responses ====
===== Sassho – Checking questions =====
Teachers may probe students about their kōan practice using sassho, "checking questions" to validate their satori (understanding) or kenshō (seeing the nature). For the mu-kōan and the clapping hand-kōan, there are between 20 and 100 checking questions, depending on the teaching lineage. The checking questions serve to deepen the insight or kyōgai of the student, but also to test his or her understanding.

===== Standardized answers =====
Those checking questions, and their answers, are part of a standardised set of questions and answers. Ama Samy states that the "koans and their standard answers are fixed." Isshu Muira Roshi also states, in The Zen Koan: "In the Inzan and Takuju lines, the answers to the koans were more or less standardized for each line respectively." Missanroku and missanchō, "Records of secret instruction" have been preserved for various Rinzai lineages. They contain both the kōan curricula and the standardized answers.

In Sōtō-Zen they are called monsan, an abbreviation of monto hissan, "secret instructions of the lineage". The monsan follow a standard question-and-answer format. A series of questions is given, to be asked by the master. The answers are also given by the master, to be memorized by the student.

According to critics, students are learning a "ritual performance", learning how to behave and respond in specific ways, learning "clever repartees, ritualized language and gestures and be submissive to the master's diktat and arbitration."

In 1916 Tominaga Shūho, using the pseudonym "Hau Hōō", published a critique of the Rinzai kōan system, Gendai sōjizen no hyōron, which also contained a translation of a missanroku. The missanroku part has been translated by Yoel Hoffmann as "The Sound of the One Hand" (see Hoffmann (1975)) and Bodiford (1993, p. 264 note 29).

===== Jakugo – Capping phrases =====
In the Rinzai school, passing a koan and the checking questions has to be supplemented by jakugo, "capping phrases", citations of Chinese poetry to demonstrate the insight. Students can use collections of those citations, instead of composing poetry themselves.

==== Post-satori practice ====
After the initial insight further practice is necessary, to deepen the insight and learn to integrate it in daily life. In Chinese Chan and Korean Seon, this further practice consists of further pondering of the same Hua Tou. In Rinzai-Zen, this further practice is undertaken by further koan-study, for which elaborate curricula exist. In Sōtō-Zen, Shikantaza is the main practice for deepening insight.

==== Real-life integration ====
After completing the koan-training, Gogo no shugyo is necessary:

[I]t would take 10 years to solve all the kōans [...] in the sōdō. After the student has solved all koans, he can leave the sōdō and live on his own, but he is still not considered a roshi. For this he has to complete another ten years of training, called "go-go-no-shugyō" in Japanese. Literally, this means "practice after satori/enlightenment", but Fukushima preferred the translation "special practice". Fukushima would explain that the student builds up a "religious personality" during this decade. It is a kind of period that functions to test if the student is actually able to live in regular society and apply his koan understanding to daily life, after he has lived in an environment that can be quite surreal and detached from the lives of the rest of humanity. Usually, the student lives in small parish temple during this decade, not in a formal training monastery. (Note: Muho Noelke. "Part 10: What does it take to become a full-fledged Sōtō-shu priest and is it really worth the whole deal?". Antaiji. Archived from the original on 2013-04-30.)

Completing the koan-curriculum in the Rinzai-schools traditionally also led to a mastery of Chinese poetry and literary skills:

[D]isciples today are expected to spend a dozen or more years with a master to complete a full course of training in koan commentary. Only when a master is satisfied that a disciple can comment appropriately on a wide range of old cases will he recognize the latter as a dharma heir and give him formal "proof of transmission" (J. inka shomei). Thus, in reality, a lot more than satori is required for one to be recognized as a master (J. shike, roshi) in the Rinzai school of Zen at present. The accepted proof of satori is a set of literary and rhetorical skills that takes many years to acquire.

==== Breathing practices ====
Hakuin Ekaku, the 17th century revitalizer of the Rinzai school, taught several practices which serve to correct physical and mental imbalances arising from, among other things, incorrect or excessive koan practice. The "soft-butter" method (nanso no ho) and "introspection method" (naikan no ho) involve cultivation of ki centered on the tanden (Chinese:dantian). These practices are described in Hakuin's works Orategama and Yasen Kanna, and are still taught in some Rinzai lineages today.

=== In Japanese Sōtō ===
Few Sōtō Zen practitioners concentrate on kōans during meditation, but the Sōtō sect has a strong historical connection with kōans, since many kōan collections were compiled by Sōtō priests. During the 13th century, Dōgen, founder of the Sōtō sect in Japan, quoted 580 kōans in his teachings. He compiled some 300 kōans in the volumes known as the Greater Shōbōgenzō. Dōgen wrote of Genjokōan, which points out that everyday life experience and indeed, the whole universe in this moment, is the "fundamental kōan", which does not refer to any ancient Zen story, but to the "heart of the matter", the question of life and death.

Over time, Sōtō sect adopted various koan meditation methods from other schools like Rinzai, including the method of observing a koan in meditation and koan curriculums. By the 15th century, Sōtō temples were publishing koan texts, and Sōtō monks often studied at Rinzai temples and passed on Rinzai koan practice lineages (and vice versa). Sōtō teachers continued to write and collect kōan texts throughout the medieval period. Later kōan collections compiled and annotated by Sōtō priests include The Iron Flute (Tetteki Tōsui) by Genrō Ōryū in 1783 and Verses and Commentaries on One Hundred Old Cases of Tenchian (Tenchian hyakusoku hyoju) compiled by Tetsumon in 1771.

However, during the late 18th and 19th century, the Sōtō tradition of kōan commentary and practice became criticized and suppressed in the Sōtō school, due to a reform movement that sought to return to the teaching of Dōgen and standardise the procedures for dharma transmission. An important figure in this development was Gentō Sokuchū (1729-1807), who sought to remove Rinzai and Obaku influences on Sōtō and focus strictly on Dōgen's teachings and writings.

Another reason for suppressing the kōan tradition in the Sōtō school may have been to highlight the differences with the Rinzai school, and create a clear Sōtō identity. This reform movement had started to venerate Dōgen as the founding teacher of the Sōtō school and they sought to make Dōgen's teachings the main standard for the Sōtō school. While Dōgen himself made extensive use of kōan commentary in his works, it is clear he emphasized shikantaza ("just sitting") without an object, instead of the koan introspection method.

=== In Sanbo Kyodan and White Plum Asanga ===
The Sanbo Kyodan school of the former Sōtō-priest Hakuun Yasutani, and the White Plum Asanga of Taizan Maezumi and the many groups that derive from him, incorporate koan-study. The Sanbo kyodan places great emphasis on kensho, initial insight into one's true nature, as a start of real practice. It follows the so-called Harada-Yasutani koan-curriculum, which is derived from Hakuin's student Takuju. It is a shortened koan-curriculum, in which the so-called "capping phrases" are removed. The curriculum takes considerably less time to study than the Takuju-curriculum of Rinzai.

To attain kensho, most students are assigned the mu-koan. After breaking through, the student first studies twenty-two "in-house" koans, which are "unpublished and not for the general public", but are nevertheless published and commented upon. There-after, the students goes through the Gateless Gate (Mumonkan), the Blue Cliff Record, the Book of Equanimity, and the Record of Transmitting the Light. The koan-curriculum is completed by the Five ranks of Tozan and the precepts.

== Examples of traditional kōans ==
=== Does a dog have Buddha-nature ===
A monk asked Zhaozhou, "Does a dog have Buddha nature, or does he not have Buddha-nature?"

Zhaozhou said, "Wu".

"Zhaozhou" is rendered as "Chao-chou" in Wade–Giles, and pronounced "Joshu" in Japanese. "Wu" appears as "mu" in Japanese, meaning "no", "not", "nonbeing", or "without" in English. This is a fragment of Case No. 1 of the Wúménguān. However, another koan presents a longer version, in which Zhaozhou answered "yes" in response to the same question asked by a different monk: see Case No. 18 of the Book of Serenity.

=== The sound of one hand ===
Two hands clap and there is a sound. What is the sound of one hand? (隻手声あり、その声を聞け)

— Hakuin Ekaku

Victor Hori comments:

... in the beginning a monk first thinks a kōan is an inert object upon which to focus attention; after a long period of consecutive repetition, one realizes that the kōan is also a dynamic activity, the very activity of seeking an answer to the kōan. The kōan is both the object being sought and the relentless seeking itself. In a kōan, the self sees the self not directly but under the guise of the kōan ... When one realizes ("makes real") this identity, then two hands have become one. The practitioner becomes the kōan that he or she is trying to understand. That is the sound of one hand.

Yet, Hakuin himself introduced this question with a reference to Kanzeon (Guanyin), bodhisattva of great compassion, who hears the sounds of the suffering ones in the world, and is awakened by hearing these sounds and responding to them. To hear the sound of one hand is to still the sounds of the world, that is, to put an end to all suffering.

=== Original face ===
Huineng asked Hui Ming, "Without thinking of good or evil, show me your original face before your mother and father were born."

This is a fragment of case No. 23 of the Wumenguan.

=== Killing the Buddha ===
If you meet the Buddha, kill him. (逢佛殺佛)

— Linji

=== Other koans ===
A student asked Master Yunmen (949 AD) "Not even a thought has arisen; is there still a sin or not?"

Master replied, "Mount Sumeru!"

A monk asked Dongshan Shouchu, "What is Buddha?"

Dongshan said, "Three pounds of flax."

This is a fragment of case No. 18 of the Wumenguan as well as case No. 12 of the Blue Cliff Record.

A monk asked Ummon, "What is the teaching that transcends the Buddha and patriarchs?"

Ummon said, "A sesame bun."

— Blue Cliff Record, case no. 77

A monk asked Zhaozhou, "What is the meaning of the ancestral teacher's (i.e., Bodhidharma's) coming from the west?"

Zhaozhou said, "The cypress tree in front of the hall."

This is a fragment of case No. 37 of the Wumenguan as well as case No. 47 of the Book of Serenity.

== Cultural legacy ==
Gentō Sokuchū, the 18th century abbot of Dogen's Eihei-ji, aggressively sought to reform Sōtō from all things 'foreign' and associated with Rinzai, including kōans. The unorthodox Zen monk Ikkyū contemplated kōans for years while creating dolls for a merchant in Kyoto, specifically penetrating the case no. 15 from The Gateless Gate and thereafter earning his dharma name Ikkyū.

Facing criticism by Buddhists such as Philip Kapleau and D. T. Suzuki for misunderstanding Zen, Alan Watts claimed that a kōan supported his lack of zazen practice. On the topic, Suzuki claimed: "I regret to say that Mr. Watts did not understand that story."

Douglas Hofstadter's 1979 book Gödel, Escher, Bach: an Eternal Golden Braid discusses Zen kōans in relation to paradoxical questions and perceiving reality outside of one's experience. Inspired by Zen teachings (including kōans), Frank Herbert wrote on the subject of the paradoxical elements of his Dune series:

What especially pleases me is to see the interwoven themes, the fugue like relationships of images that exactly replay the way Dune took shape. As in an Escher lithograph, I involved myself with recurrent themes that turn into paradox. ... It's like a kōan, a Zen mind breaker.

The 1989 South Korean film Why Has Bodhi-Dharma Left for the East? bases much of its narrative on kōans, with its title deriving from a particular kōan about the founder of Zen, Bodhidharma.

After becoming smitten with Zen (even offering to turn his own house into a zendo), filmmaker Alejandro Jodorowsky meditated and studied koans with the traveling monk Ejo Takata (1928–1997). After the release of The Holy Mountain, Jodorowsky gave a talk at the University of Mexico on the subject of kōans. After this talk, Takata gifted Jodorowsky his keisaku, believing that the filmmaker had mastered the ability to understand kōans.

In the 1958 novel The Dharma Bums, Jack Kerouac paraphrases the Yunmen shit-stick kōan as: "The Buddha is a dried piece of turd". The second volume of the manga Lone Wolf and Cub by Kazuo Koike and Goseki Kojima is titled 'The Gateless Barrier' and revolves around a Linji kōan ("If you meet a Buddha, kill him") as the protagonist is tasked to kill a troublesome "living Buddha".

In hacker culture, funny short stories concerning computer science developed, named hacker koans. The book Jargon File contains many kōans, including the AI Koans. The Codeless Code is another book about software engineers at big businesses instead of unix hackers, deriving its title from the Gateless Gate.

The song "False Prophet" by Bob Dylan includes the line: "I climbed a mountain of swords on my bare feet", a reference to a Gateless Gate kōan ("You must climb a mountain of swords with bare feet"). British musical artist Brian Eno collaborated with Intermorphic on developing a generative music software system named Koan. In 2009, American composer and multi-instrumentalist Tyshawn Sorey released his second album, Koan.

The 1997 novel The Sound of One Hand Clapping by Richard Flanagan (and its 1998 film adaptation of the same name) derives its title from a kōan by Hakuin Ekaku. The episode of the 2014 first season of Fargo entitled "Eating the Blame" derives its episode title from a koan of the same name from the Shasekishū. Cyriaque Lamar of io9 stated that the approach to technology in Tron: Legacy was reminiscent of kōans.

== Criticism ==
=== Academic criticism ===
An encounter dialogue constitutes the narrative component of a koan/gong'an. It depicts an interaction between a master and student who is being tested, or between rivals as a kind of contest of spiritual prowess. However, according to Mario Poceski, encounter dialogues are not historically reliable and "have little or nothing to do with the lives, ideas, and teachings of the Tang-era protagonists who are featured in them." Such stories rather reflect the artistic license and religious imagination of mid-tenth century Chan. Steven Heine points to the sociopolitical background of encounter-dialogue literature, stating that such writings are not concerned with the task of historiography "because their aim was not factuality but persuading the selected audience of the significance of master-disciple relations in terms of legitimating lineages and establishing the authority and hierarchy of transmission."

Albert Welter contests the commonly held view that portrayals of master-disciple encounters in the Chan yulu (recorded sayings) genre reflect notes taken by students of actual interactions with teachers in the "back rooms," such as the abbot's quarters and other private spaces. For Welter, this is "no more than an artifice to bolster Chan pretensions as a secret, mind-to-mind transmission. While later Chan custom ritually reenacted this pretension through gong'an (or kōan) investigation including private interviews between master and student, this practice is actually based on a literary artifice developed out of the need to present Chan as a new and dynamic form of Buddhism."

According to Welter, the emphasis on a "special transmission" forced a shift within Chan from the older sermonic or lecture format to the forging of the encounter dialogue as a new style, which eventually came to define Chan. For example, in the case of the Huangbo literature, Dale S. Wright observes that while the earliest layers prominently feature rational sermons critically engaging with a variety of doctrinal themes, later Chan yulu downplay or abandon this sermonic model in favor of anecdotal stories about the outrageous behavior and unconventional speech of Chan masters. Regarding the Huangbo literature, Wright states that "new stories about Huang-po began to appear in subsequent centuries and were gradually added to the earlier sections of the text. By the Ming dynasty, the Huang-po literature had grown to include a significant number of 'encounter dialogue' stories about the master, and all of these are written in later styles that are amenable to the kōan focus of fully mature Chinese Zen."

According to Welter, encounter-dialogue stories depicting bizarre antics such as hitting and shouting are best understood as caricatures which tell us less about the Chan masters who are their subjects than the motives of the people who created them, as they "are little more than representations of Chan masters as their caricature makers would like them to appear." Poceski also observes that although Zen is often portrayed as promoting spontaneity and freedom, encounter-dialogue exegesis actually points in the opposite direction, namely towards a tradition bound by established parameters of orthodoxy. According to Poceski, on the whole, the encounter-dialogue genre is marked by formulaic repetition and cliché. He describes encounter-dialogue stories as "mass produced" and "artificially manufactured." He says:

In the end, notwithstanding the iconoclastic ethos imputed to them, it is apparent that these textual sources are products of a conservative tradition that, in the course of its growth and transformation during the Tang-Song transition, was keen to promote a particular version of Buddhist orthodoxy and secure its place as the main representative of elite Chinese Buddhism.

Poceski points out how, in commenting on gong'an, Chan masters' interpretive possibilities are limited by "the straightjacket of a certain type of Chan orthodoxy." This refers to "ideological constraints and clerical agendas" which take encounter-dialogue stories as actual depictions of the enlightened behavior of perfected beings pointing to some rarefied truth, despite there being no compelling empirical evidence for this. According to Poceski, as this is never up for questioning or scrutiny, gong'an stories amount to "received articles of faith, reinforced by a cumulative tradition and embedded in specific institutional structures."

Poceski explains how gong'an have been put in the service of institutional agendas and have historically been tied up with nexuses of power. Commenting on ancient cases bolstered Chan masters as living embodiments of a mystical Chan lineage, reinforcing their status and authority. At the same time, the ostentatious literary form such exegesis often took served to impress literati supporters, the sociopolitical elites of Song China, who were its intended audience. In this way, gong'an exegesis aligned with the cultural predilections and aesthetic sensibilities of the establishment. Alan Cole also suggests that koan writing may be seen as a response to patterns of patronage. What's more, Cole states that, in China, koan writing "appears to have been a thoroughly literary affair, with little or nothing to do with meditation."

According to Foulk, commenting on a gong'an doesn't merely serve to elucidate the wisdom of the patriarchs for a student's sake, but rather functions as a device for demonstrating a master's authority, not only in relation to a living disciple, but also in relation to the patriarchs themselves. That is, in commenting on a gong'an, a master's authority is demonstrated to be both derivative and absolute: derivative in that it draws on the prestige of the earlier patriarchs, absolute in the sense that it gives the living master the last word and ultimate judgment. Similarly, Cole points out that koan exegesis is a kind of performance which positions the commentator as an absolute master of tradition, "one who has even mastered the Chan masters of the Tang" (who appear as the main characters in koan stories).

Foulk explains that koans presuppose an inherent hierarchy in which the commentator's voice is privileged above the root case itself, maintaining a clear juxtaposition between "judge" and "judged." Foulk writes, "In a social context, this means that whoever can work himself (by whatever means) into the position of speaking as a judge of old cases will thereafter be deemed a worthy spokesman of the awakened point of view, regardless of what he says." Similarly, Stuart Lachs understands koans to be largely literary fictions which serve to reinforce hierarchical structures within Zen institutions. Lachs observes that the ritual koan interview between a student and master is so presented as to give a sense of timelessness in which the student is made to feel that the procedure is an inherent part of Zen that has existed since the beginning, despite its being an institutional construction. Lachs quotes from Peter Berger's analysis of religious legitimation, stating that the point of the ritual is to "let people forget that this order was established by men and continues to be dependent on the consent of men."

Poceski points out how gong'an exegesis deploys certain strategies to deflect criticism or challenges to authority which continue all the way to the present. These often involve the charge that critics lack genuine Chan experience and understanding. As this can be true even of bodhisattvas of the tenth level, this also reflects a sectarian notion that Chan is superior to canonical Buddhism. Poceski says:

A person daring to articulate any sort of meaningful criticism can simply be dismissed as being an unenlightened ignoramus whose mind is filled with shallow views and one-sided attachments. So much for intellectual freedom and the need to question established authority.

According to Poceski, modern publications and popular Zen books tend to be confined to the same strictures and ideological suppositions as the classical sources. This includes the notion that gong'an, such as the famous "Nanquan kills a cat," represent timeless truths that must be "unlocked via dedicated Zen practice, undertaken under proper spiritual guidance," with modern interpretations tending to stick uncritically to conventional lines of exegesis that fail to question normative traditions and the untenable assumptions which buttress them. The emphasis on training under a qualified guide also reinforces the modern Zen master as gatekeeper of truth and "prime arbiter of value and meaning," reflecting a concern for orthodoxy and authority. In this way, ideological suppositions about gong'an are entwined with social relationships and power structures, as they aim to perpetuate a religious institution whose members derive tangible benefits by virtue of their status in it as maintainers of tradition. As Lachs points out, advancement within Zen institutions requires a sufficient degree of socialization, and this entails not questioning official positions and authority. In regard to this state of affairs, Poceski asks:

However, was it not the case that Chan/Zen was supposed to take us in an entirely different direction, away from the familiar intersections of knowledge and power? Wasn't it supposed to blow away archaic ideological smokescreens and obliterate all forms of conceptual posturing, rather than conjure or shore them up? Perhaps not, or so it seems.

=== Criticism from within the Zen tradition ===
Koans have also been criticized from within the Zen tradition at various points throughout history. According to Schlütter, "the practice was common enough to attract criticism" which can be found in Song sources like the Sengbao zhengxu zhuan (True continuation of the chronicles of the saṃgha treasure), where one master called Chanti Weizhao "rails against deluded masters who teach people to contemplate (can) gongan stories." The Song era master Foyan Qingyuan (1067–1120) was critical of the use of koans (public cases) and similar stories, arguing that they did not exist during the time of Bodhidharma. He said, "In other places they like to have people look at model case stories, but here we have the model case story of what is presently coming into being; you should look at it, but no one can make you see all the way through such an immense affair."

According to Arthur Braverman, Bassui Tokushō (1327–1387) "was very critical of the Rinzai practice of studying kōans, perhaps because they were becoming more and more formalized, hence losing their original spirit." Ikkyū Sōjun (1394–1481) also criticized the mechanical nature of koan practice during his time, in which formulaic answers to koans were preserved and sold.

The unconventional Rinzai master Bankei Yōtaku (1622–1693) famously criticized the kōan method, seeing it as a hopelessly contrived and artificial technique. Bankei referred to kōans disparagingly as "old wastepaper" and referred to Zen masters who required devices in order to guide people as engaging in "devices Zen." Bankei also criticized the practice of rousing a "great ball of doubt" employed in koan Zen. He said:

Others tell students pursuing this teaching that it's no good unless they rouse a great ball of doubt and succeed in breaking through it. 'No matter what,' they tell them, 'you've got to rouse a ball of doubt!' They don't teach, 'Abide in the Unborn Buddha Mind!' [but instead] cause people without any ball of doubt to saddle themselves with one, making them exchange the Buddha Mind for a ball of doubt. A mistaken business, isn't it!

When asked why he did not make use of koans, Bankei pointed out that Chan masters before Yuanwu and Dahui did not make use of koans either. Bankei observed accurately that koan study represents a later development of Chinese Chan. "In this sense," Peter Haskel writes, "Bankei was a traditionalist. He harked back to the Zen masters of the 'golden age' before the triumph of the koan, masters like Lin-chi I-hsüan (J: Rinzai Gigen, d. 860), founder of the Rinzai school." Similarly, D.T. Suzuki writes, "Bankei can be said to have attempted a return to the Zen of the early T'ang dynasty." Bankei said:

Unlike the other masters everywhere, in my teaching I don't set up any particular object, such as realizing enlightenment or studying koans. Nor do I rely on the words of the buddhas and patriarchs. I just point things out directly, so there's nothing to hold onto, and that's why no one will readily accept [what I teach].

The Sōtō school emphasizes shikantaza as its main practice, though it does not completely reject the study and use of koans. That being said, some Sōtō figures have criticized the Rinzai style koan method. Gentō Sokuchū (1729–1807), nominated abbot of Eiheiji in 1795, sought to purify the Sōtō school of koans, which he regarded as a foreign influence. According to Buswell and Lopez, the Sōtō school regards the Rinzai koan method as "an inferior, expedient attempt at concentration" in comparison to shikantaza, which is thus deployed in Sōtō polemics against the rival Rinzai school. The famous Sōtō master Kodo Sawaki also criticized Rinzai koan practice as "stepladder Zen" and said:

From the end of the Song Dynasty to the Yuan [and] Ming dynasties techniques developed, and solving koans was the way monks became respected for having had satoris. Well, today [monks] have satoris, which in certain religious sects allows the monks to be candidates to be head priests of temples. That's the way they think. But they're wrong. Believe in zazen itself, and if you put your whole body into it, that is [true] zazen.

Shin'ichi Hisamatsu (1889–1980) criticized contemporary koan practice, which advances from one koan to another, as a form of gradualism and likened it to trying to approximate a circle by forever increasing the number of sides of a polygon. He instead taught what he called the "fundamental koan" which he said included all koans. (Note: One version of Hisamatsu's fundamental koan is: Standing will not do nor will sitting, Feeling will not do nor will thinking, Dying will not do nor will living, Then, what do I do?) Hisamatsu also said of his fundamental koan that it could be practiced on one's own, without the guidance of a teacher. As Christopher Ives explains, Hisamatsu "questions the need to work with a certified Zen master." Ives observes that in Hisamatsu's approach, "one does not go to a particular master and present one's understanding of the kōan. Rather, one engages in 'mutual inquiry,' (sōgo sankyū) with other committed practitioners, on the assumption that one is ultimately meeting and engaging with the True Self."

The modern Korean Sŏn master Daehaeng (1927–2012) taught that it was not necessary to receive a hwadu (the "critical phrase" of a koan) from others since everyone already has their own "original hwadus." She said:

Daily life is itself a hwadu, so there is no need to receive a hwadu from others or to give a hwadu to others. Your very existence is a hwadu. Thus, if you are continuously holding on to a hwadu someone else gave you, when will you be able to solve your original hwadu? Trying to solve another person's hwadu is like turning empty millstones or spinning a car's wheels without moving forward. Your body itself is a hwadu. Birth itself is a hwadu. Work itself is a hwadu. The vast universe is a hwadu. If you want to add more hwadus to these, when will you be able to taste this infinitely deep world we live in?

=== Other criticism ===
D.T. Suzuki observes that although the koan method represents a convenience for the Zen practitioner, a form of "grandmotherly kindness," it is also liable to tend towards formalization and counterfeit. He writes:

The danger lies in the tendency to formalization. It may happen that a petty thief crowing like a cock at dawn will get past the barrier by deceiving the gatekeeper into opening the gates. As a matter of fact, in the koan system such fellows do get past, or we should say rather that they are passed through. The danger that the goods will be sold cheap is something intrinsic to the system. In any construct devised by man a pattern always evolves. When the pattern becomes fixed, the quick of life cannot move within it. When the realm of true reality which is freed of samsaric suffering is treated in such a way that it comes to resemble the fixed gestures and patterned moves learned in a fencing class, Zen ceases to be Zen. At times patterns work well and are useful. And they do have the virtue of universal currency. But by that alone no living thing is produced. I suppose, though, there are some who even find enjoyment in such a counterfeit, lifeless thing, much as they would divert themselves with games of chess or mahjong.

According to Alan Watts, the koan method suffered from two drawbacks. The first is that it can potentially lead to a kind of romanticism for exotic cultural forms. The second was that its method of deliberately rousing great doubt and then breaking through it after an intense period of striving amounted to a kind of psychological trick. Regarding this, Watts says:

The second, and more serious, drawback can arise from the opposition of satori to the intense “feeling of doubt” which some koan exponents so deliberately encourage. For this is to foster a dualistic satori. To say that the depth of the satori is proportional to the intensity of seeking and striving which precede it is to confuse satori with its purely emotional adjuncts. In other words, if one wants to feel exhilaratingly light-footed, it is always possible to go around for some time with lead in one’s shoes–and then take them off. The sense of relief will certainly be proportional to the length of time such shoes have been worn, and to the weight of the lead. This is equivalent to the old trick of religious revivalists who give their followers a tremendous emotional uplift by first implanting an acute sense of sin, and then relieving it through faith in Jesus.

== See also ==
Buddhism

- Kirigami
- Koans mentioning Subhuti, Tanzan, and Tetsugen
- List of koans by Yunmen Wenyan
- Original face
- Wild fox koan

Other

- Hacker koans, humorous expressions of hacker culture
- Chinese riddles
- Yogiism

== Sources ==
Printed sources

- Aitken, Robert Baker (1991). The Gateless Barrier: The Wu-Men Kuan (Mumonkan). New York: North Point Press/Farrar.
- Aitken, Robert Baker (1997). Original Dwelling Place. Washington, D.C.: Counterpoint. ISBN 1-887178-41-4.
- Besserman, Perle; Steger, Manfred (2011). Zen Radicals, Rebels, and Reformers. Wisdom Publications.
- Bodiford, William M. (1993). Sōtō Zen in Medieval Japan. University of Hawaii Press. ISBN 9780824814823.
- Bodiford, William M. (2006). "Koan practice". In John Daido Loori (ed.). Sitting with Koans. Somerville, MA: Wisdom Publications.
- Dumoulin, Heinrich (2005). Zen Buddhism: A History. Volume 2: Japan. World Wisdom Books. ISBN 978-0-941532-90-7.
- Flanagan, Richard (1997). The Sound of One Hand Clapping. Pan Macmillan Australia. ISBN 0-330-36042-6.
- Ford, James Ishmael (2006). Zen Master Who?: A Guide to the People And Stories of Zen. Wisdom Publications.
- Foulk, T. Griffith (2000). "The Form and Function of Koan Literature. A Historical Overview". In Steven Heine; Dale S. Wright (eds.). The Kōan: Texts and contexts in Zen Buddhism. Oxford: Oxford University Press.
- Hagen, Steven (2000). Introduction. In: The Iron Flute. 100 Zen Kōans. Translated by Nyogen Senzaki; Ruth Stout McCandless.
- Heine, Steven; Wright, Dale S., eds. (2000). The Kōan: Texts and contexts in Zen Buddhism. Oxford and New York: Oxford University Press. ISBN 0-19-511748-4. ISBN 0-19-511749-2
- Heine, Steven (2008). Zen Skin, Zen Marrow. Oxford: Oxford University Press.
- Hoffmann, Yoel (1975). The Sound of the One Hand. Basic Books. ISBN 978-0-465-08079-3.
- Hofstadter, Douglas (1980). Gödel, Escher, Bach: an eternal golden braid. Harmondsworth, UK: Penguin Books. ISBN 0-14-005579-7.
- Hori, Victor Sogen (1999). "Translating the Zen Phrase Book" (PDF). Nanzan Bulletin. 23: 44–58. Archived (PDF) from the original on 2019-04-24.
- Hori, Victor Sogen (2000). "Koan and Kensho in the Rinzai Zen Curriculum". In Steven Heine; Dale S. Wright (eds.). The Kōan: Texts and contexts in Zen Buddhism. Oxford: Oxford University Press.
- Hori, Victor Sogen (2003). Zen Sand: The Book of Capping Phrases for Kōan Practice (PDF). University of Hawaii Press. Archived from the original (PDF) on 2016-06-16.
- Hori, Victor Sogen (2005). "The Steps of Koan Practice". In John Daido Loori; Thomas Yuho Kirchner (eds.). Sitting With Koans: Essential Writings on Zen Koan Introspection. Wisdom Publications.
- Hori, Victor Sogen (2006). "The Steps of Koan Practice". In John Daido Loori; Thomas Yuho Kirchner (eds.). Sitting With Koans: Essential Writings on Zen Koan Introspection. Wisdom Publications.
- Ikkyū (1986). Ikkyū and The Crazy Cloud Anthology: A Zen Poet of Medieval Japan. Translated by Sonja Arntzen. University of Tokyo Press. ISBN 9780860083405.
- Jodorowsky, Alejandro (2005). The Spiritual Journey of Alejandro Jodorowsky: The Creator of El Topo. Simon and Schuster. ISBN 9781594778810.
- Kasulis, Thomas P. (2003). "Ch'an Spirituality". In Takeuchi Yoshinori (ed.). Buddhist Spirituality. Later China, Korea, Japan and the Modern World. Delhi: Motilal Banarsidass.
- Kerouac, Jack (1958). The Dharma Bums. Viking Press.
- Loori, John Daido (1994). Two Arrows Meeting in Mid Air. The Zen Kōan. Vermont / Tokyo: Charles E. Tuttle.
- MacInnes, Elaine (2007). The Flowing Bridge: Guidance on Beginning Zen Koans. Wisdom Publications.
- McRae, John (2003). Seeing Through Zen. The University Press Group.
- Mingben, Zhongfeng (2006). "The definition of a koan". Sitting with koans. Essential writings on the practice of Zen koan introspection. Boston: Wisdom Publications.
- Mohr, Michel (2000). "Emerging from Nonduality. Kōan Practice in the Rinzai tradition since Hakuin". In Steven Heine; Dale S. Wright (eds.). The Kōan: Texts and contexts in Zen Buddhism. Oxford: Oxford University Press.
- O'Halloran, Maura (2007). Pure Heart, Enlightened Mind: The Life and Letters of an Irish Zen Saint. Wisdom Publications.
- Samy, Ama (2016) [2013]. "Chapter 8: Koan, Hua-t'ou, and Kensho". Zen: The Wayless Way. CreateSpace Independent Publishing Platform. ISBN 978-1-5352-8464-6.
- Samy, Ama (2014). "Kapitel 12: Koan, Hua-t'ou und Kensho" [Chapter 12: Koan, Hua-t'ou and Kensho]. ZEN – Der große Weg ist ohne Tor [ZEN – The Great Way Has No Gate] (in German). Theseus Verlag. ISBN 978-3-89901-812-7.
- Satomi, Myodo; King, Sallie B. (1993). Journey in Search of the Way: The Spiritual Autobiography of Satomi Myodo. State University of New York Press. ISBN 978-0-7914-1971-7.
- Sasaki, Ruth Fuller (1965). Introduction. The Zen Kōan. By Isshu Miura; Ruth Fuller Sasaki. Harvest/HBJ.
- Schlütter, Morten (2000). ""Before the Empty Eon" versus "A Dog Has No Buddha-Nature". Kung-an Use in the Ts'ao-tung Tradition and Ta-hui's Kung-an Introspection Ch'an". In Steven Heine; Dale S. Wright (eds.). The Kōan: Texts and contexts in Zen Buddhism. Oxford: Oxford University Press.
- Schlütter, Morten (2008). How Zen became Zen. The Dispute over Enlightenment and the Formation of Chan Buddhism in Song-Dynasty China. Honolulu: University of Hawai'i Press. ISBN 978-0-8248-3508-8.
- Sekida, Katsuki (1985). Zen Training. Methods and Philosophy. New York / Tokyo: Weatherhill.
- Two Zen Classics. Mumonkan, The Gateless Gate. Hekiganroku, The Blue Cliff Records. Translated with commentaries by Katsuki Sekida. Translated by Sekida, Katsuki. New York / Tokyo: Weatherhill. 1996.
- Sharf, Robert H. (1995c). "Sanbokyodan. Zen and the Way of the New Religions" (PDF). Japanese Journal of Religious Studies. 22 (3–4). doi:10.18874/jjrs.22.3-4.1995.417-458.
- Shibayama (1974). The Gateless Barrier. Zen comments on the Mumonkan. Translated from Chinese and Japanese into English by Sumiko Kudo. Shambhala Publications.
- Stephenson, Barry (June 2005). "The Koan as Ritual Performance". Journal of the American Academy of Religion. 73 (2): 475–496. doi:10.1093/jaarel/lfi044. Archived from the original on 2016-11-03.
- Swanson, Paul L. (1997). "Why They Say Zen Is Not Buddhism. Recent Japanese Critiques of Buddha-Nature". In Jamie Hubbard; Paul L. Swanson (eds.). Pruning the Bodhi Tree. The Storm over Critical Buddhism. University of Hawaii Press.
- Ueda, Shizuteru (2013). "Foreword". Entangling Vines. Somerville, Massachusetts: Wisdom Publications.
- Wells, John C. (2008). Longman Pronunciation Dictionary (3rd ed.). Harlow: Pearson Education. ISBN 978-1-4058-8118-0.
- Wright, Dale S. (2000). "Koan History. Transformative Language in Chinese Buddhist Thought". In Steven Heine; Dale S. Wright (eds.). The Kōan: Texts and contexts in Zen Buddhism. Oxford: Oxford University Press.
- Yampolski, Philip (2003). "Chan. A Historical Sketch". In Takeuchi Yoshinori (ed.). Buddhist Spirituality. Later China, Korea, Japan and the Modern World. Delhi: Motilal Banarsidass.
- Yampolski, Philip (2005). "Hakuin Ekaku and the Modern Koan System". In John Daido Loori; Thomas Yuho Kirchner (eds.). Sitting With Koans: Essential Writings on Zen Koan Introspection. Wisdom Publications.
- Yuanwu (2021). The garden of flowers and weeds: a new translation and commentary on the Blue Cliff record. Translated by Matthew Juksan Sullivan. Rhinebeck, New York: Monkfish Book Publishing Company. ISBN 978-1-948626-50-7. OCLC 1246676424.

Web-sources
