= Xuedou Chongxian =

Zen Buddhist master (980–1052)

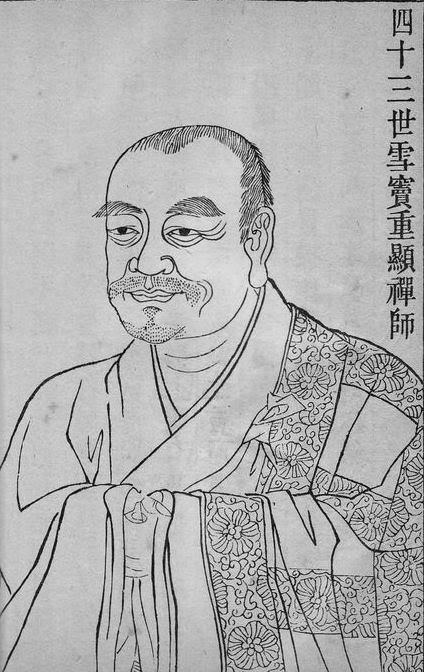

Xuedou Chongxian

Xuedou (Chinese: 雪竇重顯, 980–1052), courtesy name "Yinzhi" (Chinese: 隱之) , Japanese translation "Setcho Juken", was a Chinese Buddhist monk of Chan Buddhism (Zen). He is best known for his collection of 100 koans which later became the foundation of the koan collection Blue Cliff Record.

== Life ==
According to Wudeng Huiyuan, Xuedou was born in the year 980 in Suining Fu. His name by birth was Li Chongxian (李重顯). The origin of his family was in Mingzhou, in Southeastern China.

After his parents died, he moved to Chengdu seeking the spiritual guidance of master Renxian (仁銑) in the temple of Puan Yuan (普安院). His teachers found him an apt pupil and introduced him to Master Zhimen Guanzuo (智門光祚). Under Zhimen, Chongxian was able to deepen his study and inherited the philosophy of the school which was created by Yunmen Wenyan (雲門文偃).

Xuedou's funerary inscription records the story of his enlightenment experience. According to this inscription, Xuedou asked his teacher Zhimen, "The ancient masters didn't produce a single thought, so what's the problem?" In response, Zhimen hit Xuedou with a ceremonial fly whisk, and then struck Xuedou a second time before Xuedou could respond. These blows triggered Xuedou's enlightenment.

The completion of his study was followed by his travels to different Buddhist temples. He preached and taught in various places. Xuedou eventually settled down in Zisheng temple on the mountain of Xuedou due to the invitation of the local officer of Siming prefecture. In Zisheng temple where he spent 31 years, Xuedou witnessed the peak of his fame. Xuedou was the Fourth Patriarch in the House of Yunmen. Even the imperial court was not able to neglect his fame and consequently bestowed the title "Chan Master Mingjue" (明覺禪師) on him.

He died in 1052 during the reign of emperor Renzong of Song.

== Works ==
A Xuedou poem:

One, seven, three, five -
Nothing to rely on in this
or any world;
Nighttime falls and the
water is flooded with
moonlight.
Here in the dragon's jaws:
Many exquisite jewels.

There is an anecdote about Xuedou's last words. Near the end of his life, his pupils, regretting the inevitable death of their master, asked if there is anything that he wanted to say. Xuedou simply replied: "The only regret of my life was speaking too much."

He left behind a series of religious works such as "Baize Songgu" and "Xuedou niangu".

=== The sound of one hand ===
Although Japanese Zen Master Hakuin Ekaku is credited with inventing the koan regarding the sound of one hand clapping, The Blue Cliff Record includes Xuedou's poetic commentary that "a single hand makes no clapping sound" appears 700 years earlier.
