= Dale S. Wright =

American theologian

Dale S. Wright is Emeritus Professor of Religious Studies at Occidental College in Los Angeles. He is author of numerous books on Zen Buddhism. He and Steven Heine co-edited a series of books including The Koan: Text and Context in Zen Buddhism, The Zen Canon: Textual Foundations of Zen Buddhism, Zen Classics: Formative Texts in the History of Zen Buddhism, and Zen Ritual: Studies of Zen Buddhist Theory in Practice.
