= Mondo (scripture) =

Concept of Zen and Chan Buddhism

A mondō (問答; Chinese: wèndá) is a recorded collection of dialogues between a pupil and a Zen Buddhist master. Zen tradition values direct experience and communication over scriptures. Some rōshis (Zen teachers), go so far as to instruct their pupils to tear up their scriptures. However, sometimes the mondō acts as a guide on the method of instruction.

One example of a non-Buddhist mondō is the Sokuratesu-no-mondō, the Japanese translation of the Socratic method, whereby Socrates asked his students questions to elicit the innate truth from assumed facts.
