= Who is the master that sees and hears? =

Koan-like form of self-inquiry from the Zen-tradition

"Who is the master that sees and hears?" is a kōan-like form of self-inquiry practiced in the Zen tradition. It is best known from the 14th-century Japanese Zen Master Bassui Tokushō who pursued this question for many years.

== Overview ==
=== Background ===
Although Bassui is well-known for looking into the one who sees and hears, such a practice did not originate with him and has been variously pointed to in Buddhist sources. Bassui points out how many sutras stress the importance of seeing into one's own nature, and he reduces the six perfections of the Prajñāpāramitā Sūtra to this one truth as well.

One can find many examples in Chan sources which point to the numinous nature of the sense-faculties. For instance, Mazu Daoyi says, "Now seeing, listening, sensing, and knowing are fundamentally your original nature [běn xìng, 本性], which is also called original mind [běn xīn, 本心]." Similarly, the Hongzhou school master Fen-chou Wu-yeh says, "This very nature of yours that does see, hear, feel, and know, is the same age as empty space which is neither born nor perishable." The Dunwu rudao yaomen lun, attributed to Dazhu Huihai, also describes the nature of hearing as eternal and says, "It is your own nature which hears and it is the inner cognizer who knows."

In a similar fashion, the Śūraṅgama Sūtra says:

We’re capable of hearing sounds and silence both;
They may be present to the ear or not.
Though people say that when no sound is present,
Our hearing must be absent too, in fact
Our hearing does not lapse. It does not cease
With silence; neither is it born of sound.
Our hearing, then, is genuine and true.
It is the everlasting one. (Note: Compare with Bankei: "When you are watching and listening, you are unborn. When you are not watching and listening, you are undying.")

=== Examples ===
In Question Your Mind, Bassui urges his listeners to realize their own mind, their original face or Buddha-nature, so as "to avoid the suffering of life and death." To realize this originally pure mind, one has to see where thoughts come from, by deeply questioning "What is this mind?" Bassui then states:

When you ask yourself who the master is who this very moment sees with the eyes, hears with the ears, raises the hands, moves the feet, you realize that all these operations are the work of your mind. [...] As you pursue this inquiry more deeply, your piercing doubt will penetrate to the depths, ripping through to the bottom, and you will no longer question the fact that your mind is Buddha.

In his Wadeigassui ("Mud and Water"), Bassui places great stress on looking into the question "who is it that sees and hears?" which is equivalent to seeing into [one's] nature. Bassui's last words reputedly were:

Look! Look! Who's hearing and seeing right now?

Similarly, Linji (Jp. Rinzai) advised his listeners, "Here in this lump of red flesh there is a True Man with no rank. Constantly he goes in and out the gates of your face. If there are any of you who don't know this for a fact, then look! Look!"

While Hakuin is perhaps most famous for "the sound of one hand," he also taught the question "Who is the host of seeing and hearing?" to arouse the great doubt. (Note: Hakuin: "Constantly, he proceeds, asking, 'What is this thing, what is this thing? Who am I?' This is called the way of 'the lion that bites the man.'")

The practice of contemplating the listener is also associated with the mythology of Avalokiteśvara, the Bodhisattva of great compassion who hears the cries of all suffering beings in the universe. As scriptural support for his teaching of looking into the one who hears, Bassui cites the Śūraṅgama Sūtra in which Avalokiteśvara teaches a practice of turning one's attention to the hearing faculty. The eminent Ming dynasty monk Hanshan Deqing held this sūtra in high regard. Before relying on it to verify his own enlightenment, he first engaged in its practice of meditation based on the organ of hearing as suggested to him by his friend and traveling companion Miao-feng.

Bassui says that Kannon, the bodhisattva of compassion, was "someone who, for every sound he heard, contemplated the mind of the hearer, thereby realizing his true nature." He also identifies the "one who hears the Dharma" with the perfection achieved by the bodhisattva Kannon. Similarly, Manzan Dōhaku (1635-1715) states:

If you desire the attainment of satori, ask yourself this question: Who hears sound? As described in the Surangamasamadhi, that is Avalokitesvara's faith in the hearer. (Note: terebess.hu, [https://terebess.hu/zen/mesterek/manzan.html 卍山道白 Manzan Dōhaku (1635-1715))

Yamada Koun, dharma heir of Hakuun Yasutani, likewise used it for his practice after he had completed formal kōan-study.

Although not formally part of any of the great kōan collections, "Who is the master of seeing and hearing?" has been treated as such and similar questions can be found in several kōan collections. Nonetheless, as Braverman observes, Bassui himself, who is perhaps best known for his teaching of looking into the one who sees and hears, "was very critical of the Rinzai practice of studying kōans, perhaps because they were becoming more and more formalized, hence losing their original spirit."

== Similar questions ==
Similar examples of self-inquiry in Zen include, "Who is it that thus comes?" and "Who is the master that makes the grass green?" The Blue Cliff Record Case 1 and the Book of Serenity Case 2 relate Bodhidharma's meeting with Emperor Wu of Liang, who asked him "Who is it that is standing before me?" —to which Bodhidharma answered "Don't know."

In Chinese Chan and Korean Seon, the question "Who am I?" in several variations is used as a Hua Tou, in which the one word, "Who?" is continuously repeated. After attaining a first insight the question remains the focus of attention, to deepen the insight.

In the Japanese Ōbaku school (which has incorporated Pure Land practice) the nembutsu kōan entails the practice of reciting the name of Amitabha while holding in one's mind the question "Who is reciting?" —a question mostly assigned to lay practitioners.

The question, "Who is it?" is also explicated by Torei in The Undying Lamp of Zen. Similarly, Ramana Maharshi and Nisargadatta Maharaj used the question "Who am I?" for their practice of self-inquiry.

== See also ==
- Self-inquiry
- The sound of one hand
- Original face
- Reality tunnel

== Sources ==
Printed sources

- Bassui (2002), Mud & Water. The Collected Teachings of Zen Master Bassui, Wisdom Publications
- Braverman, Arthur (2002), Introduction to "Mud & Water. The Collected Teachings of Zen Master Bassui", Wisdom Publications
- Hakuin, Ekaku (2006), Low, Albert (ed.), Hakuin on kensho, Shambhala
- Heine, Steven; Wright, Dale S. (2005), Zen Classics: Formative Texts in the History of Zen Buddhism, Oxford University Press, ISBN 0-19-517525-5, OCLC 191827544
- Low, Albert (2006), Hakuin on Kensho. The Four Ways of Knowing, Boston & London: Shambhala

Web-sources
