= Turning the light around =

Zen Buddhist expression

Turning the light around (Ch. fǎn zhào 返照, J. henshō; K. panjo), also translated as tracing back the radiance, or counter-illumination, is a Zen Buddhist expression referring to turning attention from outward phenomena to awareness itself. In Mahayana Buddhism, the true nature of awareness is related to concepts such as luminous mind, Buddha-nature, and emptiness (śūnyatā).

== Etymology ==
The term fǎn zhào is derived from the following Chinese characters:

- 返 fǎn, return, reverse, in an opposite direction (Note: hanbook.com, fǎn)
- 照 zhào, illuminate, light up, shine, reflect, to mirror (Note: hanbook.com, zhào)
  - 返照, fǎn zhào, "to shine in the opposite direction," "to light up the source" [of light].

A longer variation of the phrase in Chinese is 回光返照 (pinyin: huí guāng fǎn zhào, Japanese: ekō henshō), "turning the light around and shining back." The additional characters, huí guāng, mean:

- 回 huí, return, go back (Note: hanbook.com hui)
- 光 guāng, light, ray, beam (Note: hanbook.com, guāng)
  - 回光, huí guāng, "returning light."

The phrase huí guāng fǎn zhào can also mean "final radiance of setting sun," (Note: hanbook.com, huí guāng fǎn zhào) as when the sun sets but still lights up the clouds from beneath; (Note: Okumura (2022, p. 389): "A more literal translation would be 'turning light, returning illumination'—that is, a description of the sky after sunset. The sun has already set below the horizon, but its light 'returns' and illuminates the entire sky, making it glow. This is the time of transition between day (when people think and act) and night (when people rest and sleep). Zazen is like evening twilight; the time of thinking is already gone, but we do not have the complete darkness of nonthinking either. Evening twilight in late autumn expresses the beauty of zazen. Settling down in this quiet tranquility and illuminating the self is the way to avoid wasting time.") and "dying flash (of lucidity or activity, prior to demise)," the moment shortly before dying when the life-force is fully expressed and one glows. (Note: Kempton (2024): "My vision was blurred by the tears, but I wiped my eyes just in time to see the huge golden orb of the sun settle behind the mountains in the west. The sky was still a deep blue, carrying the remains of the day on the wings of wide clouds lit from below by the flare. This phenomenon, when the sun disappears but its light still illuminates the sky at twilight, is known as ekō henshō (回光返照), a term also used to describe the moment right before someone dies, when the life force is fully expressed and they glow. Ekō henshō is also a familiar term in Zen. Dōgen used it in his instructions for meditation, where it is often translated as turning the light inward and illuminating the self, although more literally it means 'turning the light and returning the illumination'.³")

== Origins and meaning ==
The idea that the mind is "luminous" and "shines" goes back to a famous passage in an early Buddhist scriptural collection called the Aṅguttara-nikāya, in which the Buddha declares, "Luminous, monks, is the mind." In Chan Buddhism, this idea is related to the concept of numinous awareness (Ch. lingzhi 靈知) which refers to the ground of sentience, or the mind-ground. As Buswell observes, numinous awareness, as the fundamental quality of sentience, "not so figuratively, 'shines' on sense-objects, illuminating them and allowing them to be cognized." As one turns the mind away from attachment to sense-objects and back toward its fundamental source, one "traces back the radiance" or "turns the light around", as the Korean Sŏn adept Yŏndam Yuil (1720–1799) says:

To "trace back the radiance" means to use one's own mind to trace the radiance back to the numinous awareness of one's own mind; for this reason, it is called "trace back the radiance." It is like seeing the radiance of the sun's rays and following it back until you see the orb of the sun itself.

By tracing back the radiance, one uncovers one's fundamental nature as numinous awareness, which, as the inherent capacity for enlightenment, is both the fundamental quality of mind realized in meditation, as well as the faculty which makes meditation through tracing back the radiance possible. What's more, Buswell says this natural luminosity doesn't merely shine on sense-objects, but with meditation, "it comes virtually to shine through sense-objects, rendering them transparent and exposing their inherent voidness (śūnyatā)."

== Usage and examples ==
Turning one's light around is mentioned in many Chan sources. The Xinxin Ming, attributed to the third Chan patriarch Sengcan, says:

One moment of reversing the light
Is greater than the previous emptiness.
The previous emptiness is transformed;
It was all a product of deluded views.

Counter-illumination also occurs in the Jueguan lun of the Oxhead School, which contains a dialogue in which the student, called Conditionality, experiences awakening at the hands of his teacher, Enlightenment. Where Enlightenment's teaching relies extensively on negation, Conditionality's awakening is described in positive terms as the counter-illumination of the "mysterious brilliance" of pure wisdom.

In the Platform Sutra, a key Zen scripture, the semi-legendary sixth patriarch Huineng (638–713) explains that his preaching is without any secret words. He rather states that if one can counter-illuminate one's original face, then "you will realize that the secret was on your side." The Chan master Shitou Xiqian (700–790) also says, "Turning my own light in upon myself 迴光返照, I return / And penetrate into the spiritual source, neither front nor back." Likewise, in his sermons, Mazu Daoyi (709–788) says, "When within a single thought one reflects and illuminates within (若能一念返照), then everything is the Holy Mind."

The phrase "turning the luminosity [of the mind] towards the mind's source" (fanzhao xinyuan) appears in the Dunhuang text, the Dunwu dacheng zhenglijue (Ratification of the True Principle of the Mahayana Teaching of Sudden Enlightenment), a text said to record the teachings of Heshang Moheyan (Hva shang Mahāyāna), a Chinese Chan master active in Tibet during the late 8th century:

[Gradualist] question: What do you mean when you speak of "contemplating the mind"?
Reply: To turn the light [of the mind] towards the mind's source, that is contemplating the mind. [This means that] one does not reflect on or observe whether thoughts are in movement or not, whether they are pure or not, whether they are empty or not. It is also not to reflect on non-reflection. This is why the Vimalakīrti Sūtra explains: "Non-observation is enlightenment."

According to Carmen Meinert, "this method is meant to be an immediate return to mind's source itself and might even be seen as a face-to-face recognition of the nature of mind." Meinert points out that the term fan yuan, "return to the source," also appears in the Dunwu dacheng zhenglijue, in a quotation from the Śūraṅgama Sūtra. The term 返照 (fǎn zhào) also occurs in Zongmi's (780–841) Sub-commentary to the Sutra of Perfect Enlightenment, where it refers to recognizing original enlightenment.

Linji Yixuan (died 866 CE), a key figure in the Linji school of Zen, states that all that is needed to obtain the Dharma is to "turn your own light in upon yourselves and never seek elsewhere." Linji further connects this "turning one's light around" (fǎn zhào 返照) with non-doing. When one stops seeking and turns one's own light in upon oneself, Linji tells us, on that very instant one will have "nothing to do" (wú shì, 無事). (Note: Compare with the Xinxin Ming: "In self-illumination, vast and clear, The mind's power exerts itself no more.") However, "turning one's light around" does not necessarily imply anything like staring at the mind or concentrating within. Linji quotes Shenhui's well-known criticism of such things as arresting the mind, staring at silence, summoning the mind to focus it on externals, controlling the mind to make it clear within, and concentrating the mind to enter into meditation. Moreover, Linji says that looking for something within is just as wrong as seeking externally, since there's nothing within that can be grasped. He says: "Outside the mind there is no Dharma, and even inside the mind it can't be grasped. So what is there to seek for?" (Note: Compare with the following, attributed to Baozhi: "Inward looking, outward looking, all are bad")

Yuanwu Keqin (1063—1135) said: "The most important thing is for people of great faculties and sharp wisdom to turn the light of mind around and shine back and clearly awaken to this mind before a single thought is born." In a similar fashion, Hongzhi Zhengjue (1091–1157), the famous master of the Caodong school, well known for his practice of silent illumination (Ch. mòzhào), explains, "...you must take the backward step and directly reach the middle of the circle from where light issues forth."

Chinul's (1158–1210) Secrets of Cultivating the Mind states:

"There are many points at which to enter the noumenon. I will indicate one approach which will allow you to return to the source.

Chinul: Do you hear the sounds of that crow cawing and that magpie calling?

Student: Yes.

Chinul: Trace them back and listen to your hearing-nature. Do you hear any sounds?

Student: At that place, sounds and discriminations do not obtain.

Chinul: Marvelous! Marvelous! This is Avalokiteśvara's method for entering the noumenon. Let me ask you again. You said that sounds and discriminations do not obtain at that place. But since they do not obtain, isn't the hearing-nature just empty space at such a time?

Student: Originally it is not empty. It is always bright and never obscured.

Chinul: What is this essence which is not empty?

Student: As it has no former shape, words cannot describe it.

This is the life force of all the Buddhas and patriarchs—have no further doubts about that."

The Japanese Zen master Dōgen (1200–1253) describes it as follows: "You should stop the intellectual practice of pursuing words and learn the 'stepping back' of 'turning the light around and shining back' (Jp: ekō henshō); mind and body will naturally 'drop off,' and the 'original face' will appear." According to Joseph Markowski, quoting Davis 2016, for Dōgen, directing our awareness upon "awareness" itself reveals a "mirroring" of phenomena "which reflects things as they show themselves without distortion" (Davis 2016, 223). Thus, the practice of mirroring via non-thinking is to be "totally engaged in the vicissitudes of life with all its ups and downs [...] on the basis of impartial compassion, rather than on the basis of egoistic craving and loathing" (Davis 2016, 223).

Lanxi Daolong (1213—1279) said: "The knowing mind is the light, errant thoughts are shadows; the light illumining things is called shining, and when the mind and thoughts do not range over things but are turned toward the original nature, this is called 'turning the light around to shine back.' It is also called 'panoramic illumination'; illumining the whole of the immediate substance, it is where neither delusion nor enlightenment have ever appeared."

The following appears in the final entry of the Jingde Chuandeng lu, and was appended to the text in the Yuan dynasty: "If unable to have faith, you will forever sink into a deep pit in an ocean of faults, but if you can turn the light around, then in one instant heart and thoughts are put to rest; at this time confusions, afflictions and foolish sentiments suddenly vanish, all karmic limitations turn into the sweet dew of the finest gee, to peace and happiness in the nation."

Bassui Tokushō (1327–1387) said: "When you turn the light directly within and see clearly, the pure magnificent Dharma body of the self will manifest, and there will be nothing other than you."

According to contemporary teacher Jeff Shore, the phrase "describes the essence of Zen practice." (Note: Jeff Shore, Principles of Zen Practice: Illuminating the Source) According to Shore, it "jump[s] directly into the heart of the matter [...] short circuit[ing], in one fell swoop, the endless regression of ordinary consciousness."

Regarding the meaning of biguan, or "wall contemplation," a practice famously attributed to Bodhidharma, Yanagida Seizan writes, "At the same time, 'wall contemplation' includes the idea of 'turning back the brilliance in counter illumination' (ekō henshō 廻向返照, or huixiang fanzhao in Chinese), the wonderfully bright radiance of the setting sun. Or the inconceivable function of the mirror, which illuminates each and every thing in existence." Jeffrey Broughton also points out that where Bodhidharma's teachings appear in Tibetan translation among the Dunhuang manuscripts, the Chinese phrase "in a coagulated state abides in wall-examining" (ning chu pi-kuan) is replaced in Tibetan with "rejects discrimination and abides in brightness" (rtogs pa spangs te | lham mer gnas na). (Note: Broughton sees this as a curious divergence, as Tibetan translations of Chinese Chan texts are usually quite literal. He concludes that in early Tibet, "wall examining" did not refer to the literal practice of sitting cross-legged facing a wall. However, Broughton points out that Stein Tibetan 710, which is a Tibetan translation of the Lengqie shizi ji, has: "remains in purity and gazes at the wall-surface.")

== See also ==
- Svasaṃvedana (the awareness of being aware)
- Who is hearing this sound?
- Original face
- Self-inquiry
- Āśrayaparāvṛtti (turning around at the basis of mind)

== Sources ==
=== Printed sources ===
- Bassui (2002). Mud and water. Wisdom Publications.
- Buswell, Jr., Robert E. (1983). The Korean Approach to Zen: The Collected Works of Chinul. University of Hawaii Press.
- Buswell, Jr., Robert E.; Lopez, Jr., Donald S. (2014). "fanzhao". The Princeton Dictionary of Buddhism.
- Buswell, Jr., Robert E. (2016). Numinous Awareness is Never Dark. University of Hawaii Press.
- Davis, Bret W. (2016), "Dōgen", in LaFollette, Hugh (ed.), International Encyclopedia of Ethics, John Wiley & Sons Ltd. Publishing
- Kempton, Beth (2024). Kokoro: Japanese Wisdom for a Life Well Lived. Hachette UK.
- Markowski, Josehh Daniel (2021). Dogen's Practice of Non-thinking. VU Research Portal.
- McRae, John (2008), THE PLATFORM SUTRA OF THE SIXTH PATRIARCH. Translated from the Chinese of Zongbao (Taishō Volume 48, Number 2008) by John R. McRae (PDF)
- Okumura, Shohaku (2022). Dogen's Shobogenzo Zuimonki. Wisdom Publications.
- Sasaki, Ruth Fuller (2008). The Record of Linji. University of Hawaii Press.
- Swanson, Paul (2018). Bodhidharma, Wall Contemplation, and Mixed Binomes. Chisokudō Publications.
