= Linji =

Linji may refer to:

- Linji Yixuan (died 866), Chinese Zen Buddhist monk
- Linji school, sect of Chinese Zen
