= Makyō =

"Ghost cave": Zen Buddhist concept

The term makyō (魔境, makyō) is a Japanese word that literally means "realm of demons/monsters" or "uncanny realm" or forsaken place, and hellhole.

== Makyō in Zen Meditation ==
In Zen, Makyō is a figurative reference to the kind of self-delusion that results from clinging to experience. Makyō used in a broad sense refers to people's attachments to experiences in their everyday lives. However, makyō may also be used in a more specific sense, referring to illusory experiences that sometimes occur during Zen meditation.

In Philip Kapleau's The Three Pillars of Zen, Hakuun Yasutani explained the term as the combination of "ma" meaning devil and "kyo" meaning the objective world. This character for "devil" can also refer to Mara, the Buddhist "tempter" figure; and the character kyo can mean simply region, condition or place. Makyō refers to the hallucinations and perceptual distortions that can arise during the course of meditation and can be mistaken by the practitioner as "seeing the true nature" or kenshō. Zen masters warn their meditating students to ignore sensory distortions. As Hakuun Yasutani states:

"Makyō are the phenomena–visions, hallucinations, fantasies, revelations, illusory sensations–which one practicing zazen is apt to experience at a particular stage in his sitting. ...Never be tempted into thinking that these phenomena are real or that the visions themselves have any meaning. To have a beautiful vision of Buddha does not mean that you are any nearer becoming one yourself, any more than a dream of being a millionaire means you are any richer when you awake."

— Hakuun Yasutani, in Philip Kapleaus's The Three Pillars of Zen, pp. 42-44

Makyō can take many different forms depending on an individual's personality and temperament. They can occur in the form of visions and perceptual distortions, but they can also be experiences of blank, trance-like absorption states. In the Zen school, it is understood that such experiences – however fascinating they may be – are not a true and final enlightenment.

John Daido Loori offers a similar description of makyō in The Art of Just Sitting. Loori writes:

"Sometimes during sitting people have what we call makyo: a vision or hallucination. Other times it's a smell or sound. Students often think this means they're enlightened–particularly if the image is related to Zen, like the Buddha sitting on a golden lotus–and they immediately run off to dokusan (独参) to get it confirmed. The teacher will usually listen and then say something like, "Maybe you're not sitting straight. Sit straight. Don't worry, it will go away." It doesn't matter whether we attach to a regular thought, or to the thought of enlightenment. Whatever it is, it is still attachment."

— John Daido Loori, The Art of Just Sitting, p. 139

Again, experiences of makyō vary in form, and many Zen teachers do not recognize such experiences as signs of enlightenment. Equating makyō with enlightenment is instead seen as a form of attachment to experience.

Robert Baker Aitken described makyō as a class of delusions. He mentioned several examples of makyō outside of Zen meditation, including hearing heavenly voices, speaking in tongues, hallucinations such as a flock of white doves descending into one's body, and experiences of astral projection. Aitken thought makyō might be valuable to people interested in the rich potential of what human minds can experience, but he believed makyo had little or nothing to offer people interested in personal insight.

More specific to Zen, Aitken claimed that makyō indicate progress in meditation. Makyō indicate that people have passed beyond superficial stages of thinking about Zen and their meditation. Yet, Aitken considered it a grave mistake to equate makyō with something final or ultimate. He wrote:

"Always relate your makyo to your teacher, but do not try to cultivate them, for they are spontaneous and cannot be summoned up. When they do occur, let them go as you would any other delusion. ...No matter how interesting and encouraging thoughts or makyo may be, they are self-limited."

— Robert Baker Aitken, Taking the Path of Zen, p. 46

Yet again, makyō appear in a great variety of forms, but they are not considered signs of enlightenment.

== Comparisons to Other Traditions ==
Experiences comparable to makyō occur in other meditative traditions. In some Hindu schools, experiences similar to makyō are regarded as a product of the sukshma sharira, or "experience body", in its unstable state. Such experiences are viewed as another form of maya, the illusory nature of the world as apprehended by ordinary consciousness. Tibetan contemplative literature uses the parallel term nyam, which fall into three categories, usually listed as clarity, bliss, and non-conceptuality. Many types of meditation phenomena can be classed under this rubric, and are generally tied to the reorganization of the body's subtle energies that can occur in meditation. See Dudjom Lingpa, (cited in Wallace, the Attention Revolution), and Padmasambhava (in Treasures from the Juniper Ridge) for more specific examples.
