= Linji Temple =

Notable Buddhist temple and cradle of Linji (Rinzai) school

- 临济寺
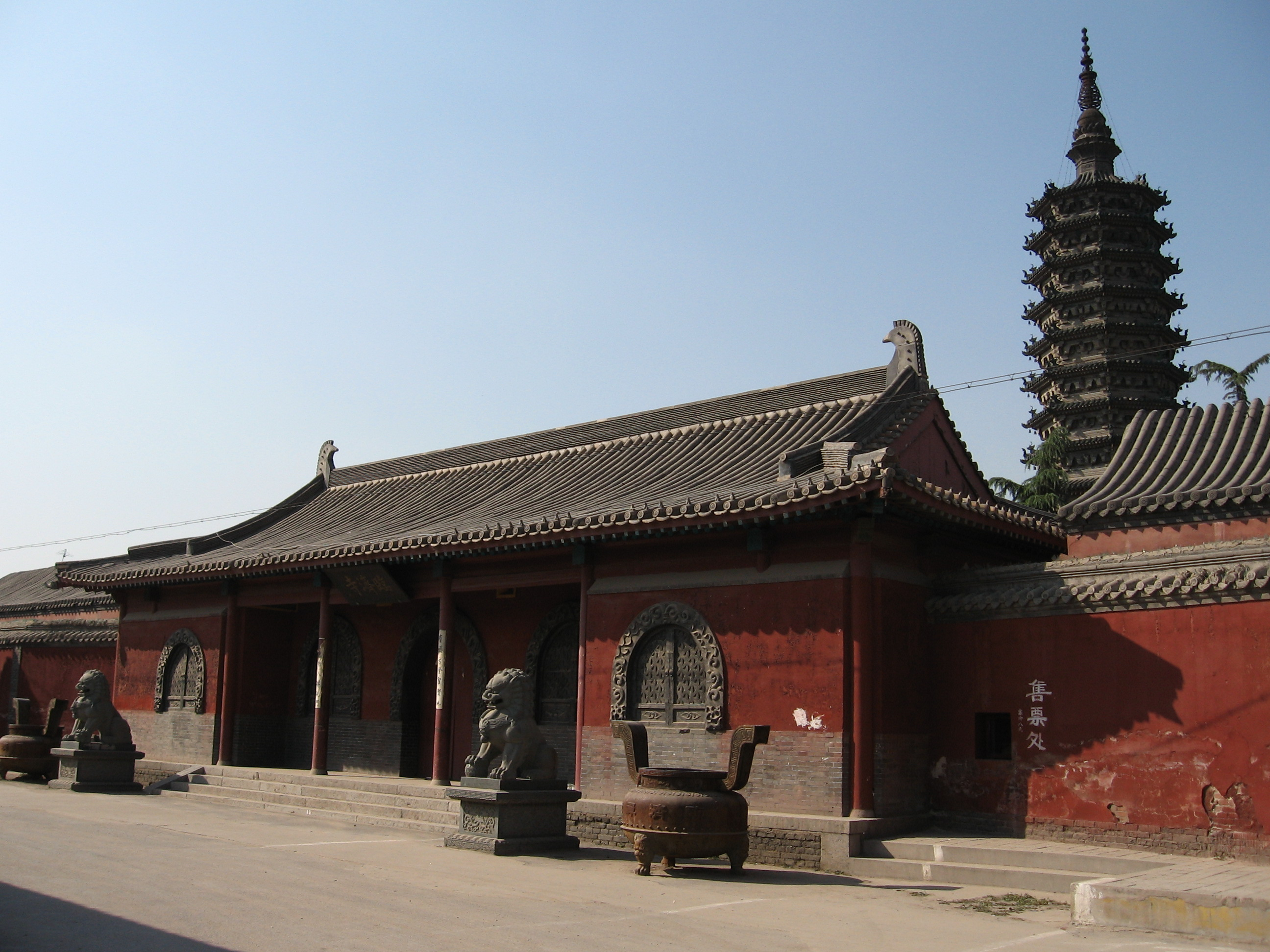
- The shanmen at Linji Temple.

- Location within Hebei Location within China

Religion
- Affiliation: Buddhism
- Sect: Linji school

Location
- Location: Zhengding Town, Zhengding County, Hebei
- Country: China
- Interactive map of Linji Temple
- Coordinates: 38°08′28″N 114°34′46″E

Architecture
- Style: Chinese architecture
- Established: 540

Website
- www.linjizuting.cn

Linji Temple (simplified Chinese: 临济寺; traditional Chinese: 臨濟寺; pinyin: Línjì Sì) is a Buddhist temple located in Zhengding Town of Zhengding County, Hebei, China. In the mid-Tang dynasty (618–907), Linji Yixuan founded the Linji school, which eventually became one of the five major schools of Buddhism in China. In the Song dynasty (960–1276), two Japanese monks Eisai and Shuniyo introduced Linji school to Japan. Linji Temple is the cradle of Linji (Rinzai) school of both Chinese and Japanese Buddhism. The temple was added to National Key Buddhist Temples in Han Chinese Area's list in 1983. The eldest thing in the temple is the Chengling Stupa, which still preserves the architectural style of the Liao and Jin dynasties (916–1234).

== History ==
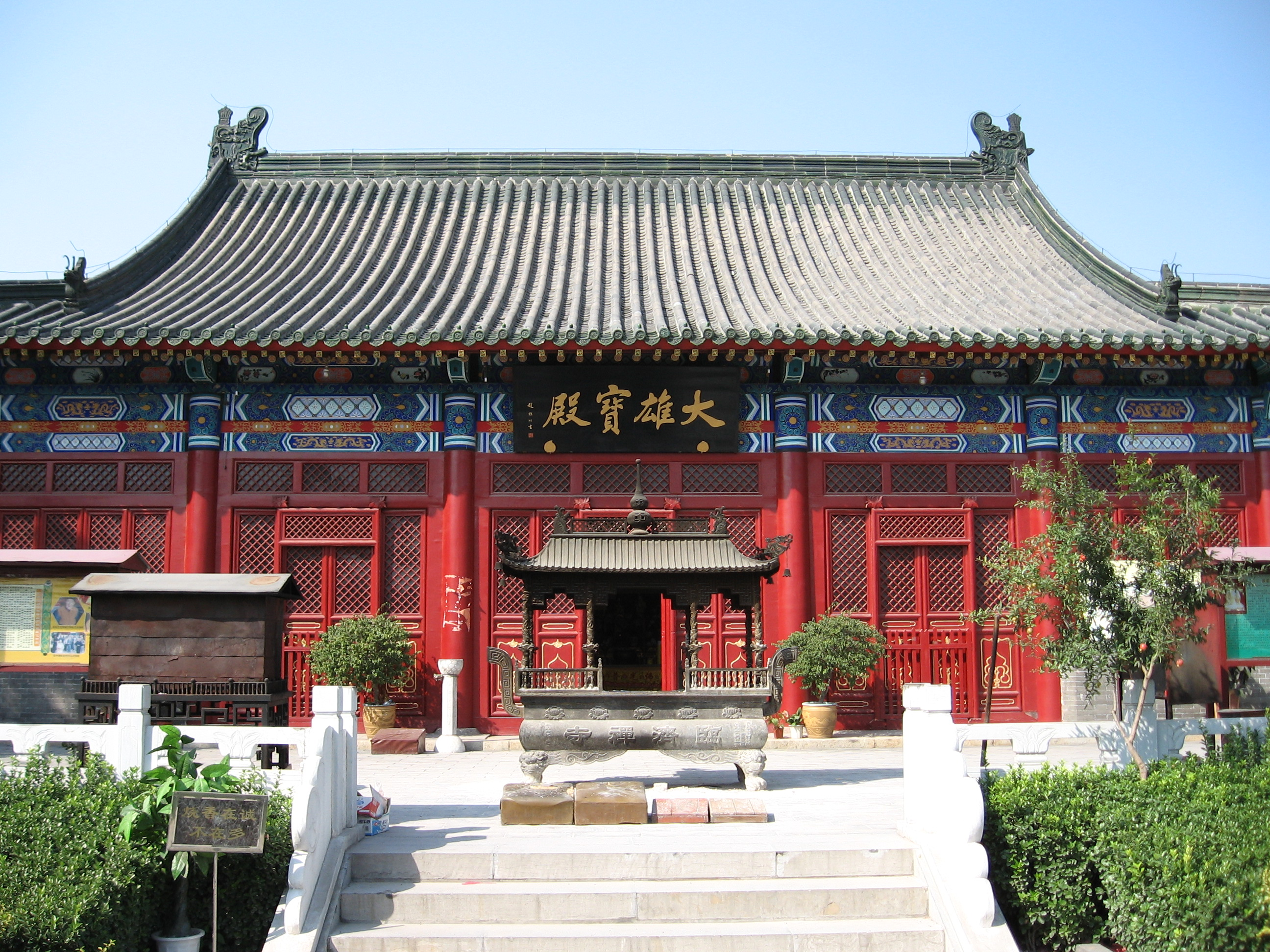
The Mahavira Hall at Linji Temple, which was rebuilt by the then abbot Shi Youming in 1987.

=== Eastern Wei ===
Linji Temple was first established in 540, namely the 2nd year of Xinghe period in the Eastern Wei (534–550).

=== Tang dynasty ===
In 854, in the Dazhong period of the mid–Tang dynasty (618–907), Linji Yixuan came to the temple to promote Buddhism. He created Linji school and Linji Temple became the cradle of Linji school since then. After he died in 867, his disciples built two stupas to house his Śarīra, one in Daming County and the other in Lingji Temple. Emperor Yizong named the stupa of Lingji Temple "Chengling Stupa" (澄灵塔).

=== Song and Jin dynasties ===
From 1125 to 1234, a protracted war between the two countries of the Song Empire (960–1276) and Jin Empire (1115–1234). Linji Temple was completely destroyed with only the stupa remaining. In 1183, namely the 23rd year of Dading period in the Jin dynasty, Emperor Shizong ordered local government to restore Lingji Temple with Liao and Jin dynasties architectural style.

=== Yuan dynasty ===
In the Yuan dynasty (1271–1368), abbot Haiyun (海云) repaired and renovated the temple. Zhao Mengfu, the prominent calligrapher at that time, wrote a tablet inscription for the temple.

=== Ming dynasty ===
In 1521, namely the 12th year of Zhengde period in the Ming dynasty (1368–1644), monks repaired the temple. At that time, the existing main buildings include the Shanmen, Mahavira Hall, Zushi Dian, Chengling Stupa and monk's dormitory. In the late Ming and early Qing dynasties, the temple was devastated by flames of war.

=== Qing dynasty ===
In 1734, during the period of the Yongzheng Emperor of the Qing dynasty (1644–1911), Yongzheng Emperor granted Lingji Yixuan the title "Chan Master Zhenchang Huizhao" and gave a stone tablet to the temple. In 1830, during the reign of Daoguang Emperor, General Shu Tong'a (舒通阿) donated property to renovate the temple.

=== Republic of China ===
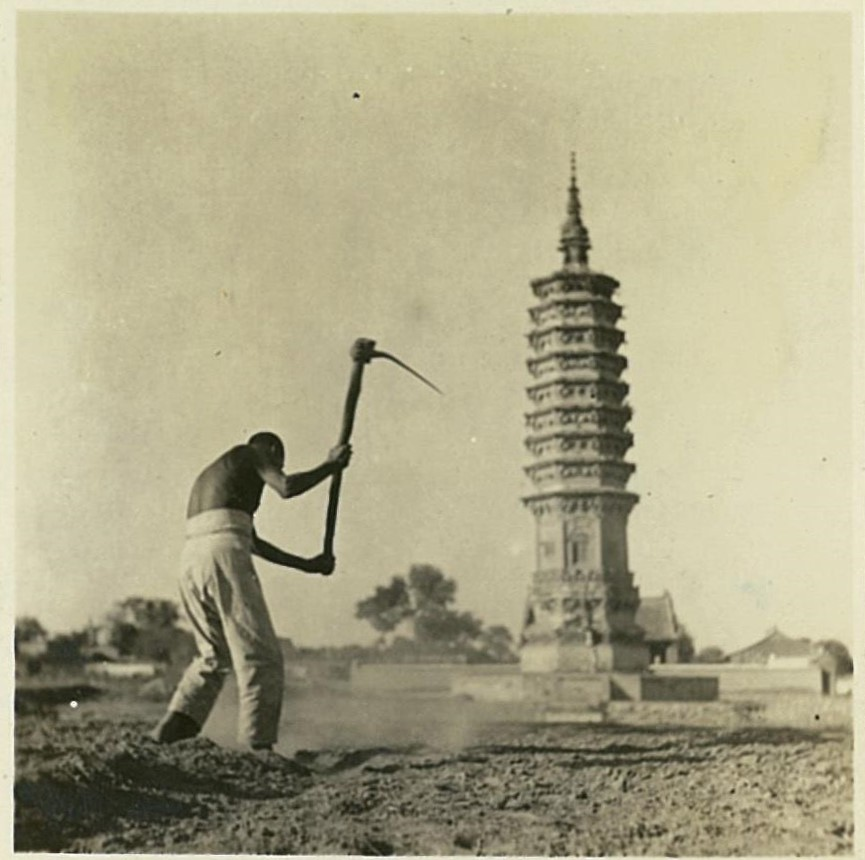
Chengling Tower in period of Republic of China

During the Second Sino-Japanese War, there were still 6 buildings in the temple. After the Chinese Civil War, the temple only had the Chengling Stupa.

=== People's Republic of China ===
After the founding of PRC, the communist government confiscated the sacred temple lands and forcefully disrobed the monastic members. In 1982, Shi Youming (释有明) took up the post of abbot in the ruins of Linji Temple. In 1983, Linji Temple was listed among the first group of the National Key Buddhist Temple in Han Chinese Area by the State Council of China. After the 3rd plenary session of the 11th Central Committee of the Chinese Communist Party, according to the national policy of free religious belief, Linji Temple was returned to the Buddhist community and officially reopened to the public in 1984.

In 1985, the Japanese Buddhist orders of Rinzai and Ōbaku schools provided financial support to restore the Chengling Stupa. The Mahavira Hall, Hall of Guru and monk's dormitory were added to the temple gradually. Zhao Puchu, the then president of the Buddhist Association of China, wrote the plaques of "Linji Temple" and "Mahavira Hall". On May 19, 1986, Benhuan and Makoto Shinohara (筱原大雄), both eminent descendants of Linji (Rinzai) school in China and Japan, held a canonization ceremony at the temple.

In 2001, the Yuantong Hall, Yaoshi Dian and monk's dormitory were add to the temple.

== Architecture ==
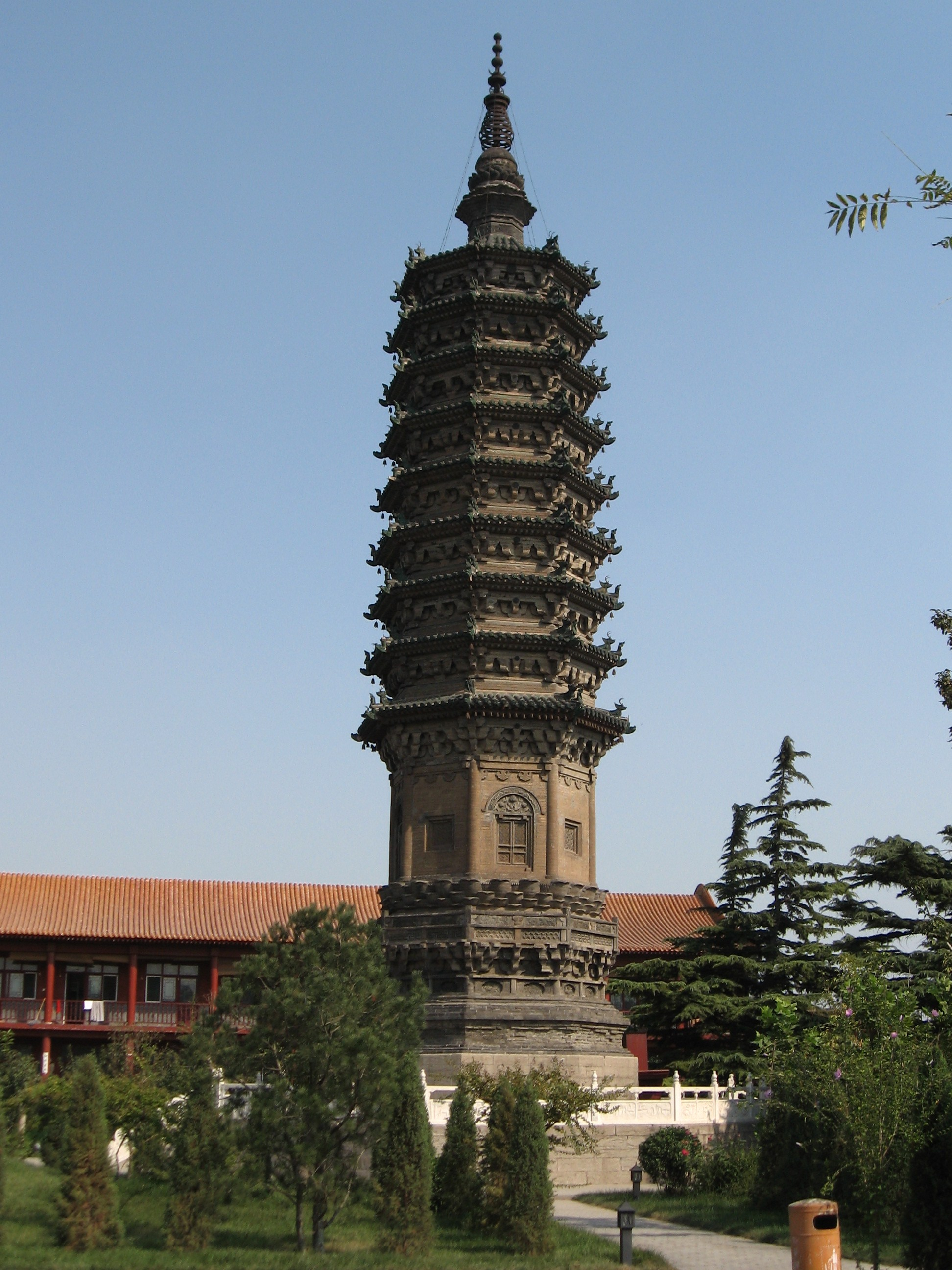
The Chengling Stupa.

=== Mahavira Hall ===
The Mahavira Hall was rebuilt in 1987. In the center of the hall enshrines the statue of Shijiamouni with Kassapa Buddha standing on the left and Ananda on the right. At the back of Shijiamouni's statue are statue of Guanyin. The statues of Eighteen Arhats stand on both sides of the hall. Dizang stands in the southeast, Wenshu stands in the north and Puxian stands in the west.

=== Faru Hall ===
The Faru Hall enshrining the gurus of Buddhism. In the middle is Bodhidharma, statues of Huineng and Linji Yixuan stand on the left and right sides of Shijiamouni's statue.

=== Hall of Four Heavenly Kings ===
The statue of the future Buddha Mi Le is enshrined in the Hall of Four Heavenly Kings. Four Heavenly Kings' portraits hang on the east and west walls, they are the eastern Dhṛtarāṣṭra, the southern Virūḍhaka, the western Virūpākṣa, and the northern Vaiśravaṇa. Portraits of the dharmapalas Weituo and Qielan hang on the south wall.

=== Chengling Stupa ===
The Chengling Stupa (澄灵塔) also known as "Green Stupa" (青塔), was built in 867 and has been rebuilt numerous times since then. the stupa is multi-eaves style brick stupa with 9 stories. It has an octahedral shaped hollow tiers and is 30.47-metre (100.0 ft) high. It is composed of a stupa base, a sumeru throne and a dense-eave body. The sumeru throne and banisters were engraved patterns of various flowers and birds.
