= Kenshō =

Seeing one's "true nature" as inherently empty of a personal self

Kenshō (Rōmaji; Japanese and classical Chinese: 見性, Pinyin: jianxing, Sanskrit: dṛṣṭi-svabhāva) is an East Asian Buddhist term from the Chan / Zen tradition which means "seeing" or "perceiving" (見) "nature" or "essence" (性), (Note: traditional Chinese and Japanese: 見性; ; lit. 'see [one's] nature') or 'true face'. (Note: Martin Goodson (April 14, 2021), A Sermon on the Original Face) It is usually translated as "seeing one's [true] nature," with "nature" referring to buddha-nature, ultimate reality, the Dharmadhatu. The term appears in one of the classic slogans which define Chan Buddhism: to see oneʼs own nature and accomplish Buddhahood (見性成佛).

Kenshō is an initial insight or sudden awakening, not full Buddhahood. It is to be followed by further training which deepens this insight, allows one to learn to express it in daily life and gradually removes the remaining defilements.

The Japanese term kenshō is often used interchangeably with satori, which is derived from the verb satoru, and means "comprehension; understanding". (Note: Denshi Jisho – Online Japanese dictionary) (Note: According to Fischer-Schreiber, kenshō and satori are nearly synonymous, with a customary distinction of using kenshō for an initial enlightenment experience that still requires deepening, and satori for the Buddhahood enlightenment of a Buddha or Zen patriarch. Hakuin uses the word "satori" for initial insight, synonymous with kensho.) (Note: The Japanese Zen-tradition has a rich vocabulaire of terms related to "enlightenment": awakenening (kaku), true awakening (shōgaku), perfect awakening (engaku), insight (sei), attaining the Way (jōdō), becoming Buddha (jōbutsu), opening the eye (kaigen), liberation (gedatsu), aythetication (shō), the great death (daishi), self-enlightenment without a teacher (mushi dokugo), great satori with full penetration (taigo tettei), and peerless perfect enlightenment (anokutara sanmyaku sanbodai). The list is not exhausted with these terms. Another term for deep awakening is daigo.)

== Terminology ==
The Chinese Buddhist term jianxing (simplified Chinese: 见性; traditional Chinese: 見性; pinyin: jiànxìng; Wade–Giles: chien-hsing) compounds:

- jian 見 "see, observe, meet with, perceive";
- xing 性 "(inborn) nature, character, personality, disposition, property, quality, gender"; also 'true face'. (Note: Compare Original face, and Douglas Harding.)

=== History ===
Buddhist monks who produced Sanskrit-Chinese translations of sutras faced many linguistic difficulties:

- They chose Chinese jian 見 to translate Sanskrit dṛś दृश् "see, look", and the central Buddhist idea of dṛṣṭi दृष्टि "view, seeing (also with the mind's eye), wisdom, false view".
- Translators used xing 性 or zixing 自性 "self-nature" for Sanskrit svabhāva स्वभाव "intrinsic nature, essential nature".

Thus, jianxing was the translation for dṛṣṭi-svabhāva, to "view one's essential nature".

The term is found in the Chinese Platform Sutra (c. 8th century; 2, Prajñā "wisdom, understanding").

=== Pronunciations ===
The Standard Chinese pronunciation jianxing historically derives from (c. 7th century CE) Middle Chinese kien^{C}sjäŋ^{C}. Sino-Xenic pronunciations of this term exist:

- kenshō 見性 or ケンショウ (on'yomi) in Sino-Japanese vocabulary
- Korean: 견성; RR: gyeonseong in Sino-Korean vocabulary
- kiến tính in Sino-Vietnamese vocabulary.

== Meanings ==
Translating kenshō into English is semantically complex.

=== Encyclopedic and dictionary definitions ===
Some encyclopedia and dictionary definitions are:

- Soothill (1934): "To behold the Buddha-nature within oneself, a common saying of the Chan (Zen) or Intuitive School."
- Fischer-Schreiber (1991): Lit. "seeing nature"; Zen expression for the experience of awakening (enlightenment). Since the meaning is "seeing one's own true nature," kenshō is usually translated "self-realization." Like all words that try to reduce the conceptually ungraspable experience of enlightenment to a concept, this one is also not entirely accurate and is even misleading, since the experience contains no duality of "seer" and "seen" because there is no "nature of self' as an object that is seen by a subject separate from it.
- Baroni (2002): "Seeing one's nature," that is, realizing one's own original Buddha Nature. In the Rinzai school, it most often refers more specifically to one's initial enlightenment attained through kōan practice.
- Muller (year unknown): To see one's own originally enlightened mind. To behold the Buddha-nature within oneself, a common saying of the Chan school, as seen for example, in the phrase 'seeing one's nature, becoming Buddha' 見性成佛.

=== Definitions by Buddhist scholars ===
Buddhist scholars have defined kenshō as:

- D.T. Suzuki: "Looking into one's nature or the opening of satori"; "This acquiring of a new point of view in our dealings with life and the world is popularly called by Japanese Zen students 'satori' (wu in Chinese). It is really another name for Enlightenment (Anuttarā-samyak-saṃbodhi)". (Note: D.T. Suzuki has been criticized for his highly idealized and inaccurate picture of Japanese Zen. Anuttarā-samyak-saṃbodhi is the highest state of realization and awakening. Satori, or kensho, is a first glimpse into "nature", to be followed by further training.)
- Dumoulin (1988/2005): "Enlightenment is described here as an insight into the identity of one's own nature with all of reality in an eternal now, as a vision that removes all distinctions. This enlightenment is the center and the goal of the Zen way. Hakuin prefers the term "seeing into one's nature", which for him means ultimate reality. The Buddha nature and the cosmic Buddha body, wisdom (prajna), and emptiness (sunyata), the original countenance one had before one was born, and other expressions from the rich palette of Mahayana terms were all familiar to him from his continued study of the sutras and Zen literature."
- Peter Harvey (1990): "It is a blissful realization where a person's inner nature, the originally pure mind, is directly known as an illuminating emptiness, a thusness which is dynamic and immanent in the world."
- G. Victor Sogen Hori (2000): "The term consists of two characters: ken, which means "see" or "seeing", and sho, which means "nature", "character", "quality." To "see one's nature" is the usual translation for kensho".

=== Definitions by Buddhist teachers and practitioners ===
Buddhist teachers and practitioners have defined kenshō as:

- Jiyu-Kennett: "To see into one's own nature. The experience of enlightenment, satori."
- Myodo Ni Satomi, a student of Hakuun Yasutani (1993): "Seeing the-self, that is, the true self or Buddha nature."

=== Further notions ===
According to Hori, the term kenshō refers to the realization of non-duality of subject and object in general, but the term kenshō may also be applied in other contexts: "How do you kenshō this?"

Kenshō is not a single experience, but refers to a whole series of realizations from a beginner's shallow glimpse of the nature of mind, up to a vision of emptiness equivalent to the 'Path of Seeing' or to Buddhahood itself. In all of these, the same 'thing' is known, but in different degrees of clarity and profundity.

"Kenshō" is commonly translated as enlightenment, a word that is also used to translate bodhi, prajña, satori and buddhahood. Western discourse tends to use these terms interchangeably, but there is a distinction between a first insight and the further development toward Buddhahood.

== Insight versus experience ==
Kensho is insight, an understanding of our essential nature as Buddha-nature, or the nature of mind, the perceiving subject itself, which was equated with Buddha-nature by the East Mountain school.

Contemporary understanding also describes kensho as an experience, as in "enlightenment experience"; the term "enlightenment experience" is itself a tautology: "Kensho (enlightenment) is an enlightenment (kensho)-experience". The notion of "experience" fits in a popular set of dichotomies: pure (unmediated) versus mediated, noncognitive versus cognitive, experiential versus intellectual, intuitive versus intellectual, nonrational versus rational, nondiscursive versus discursive, nonpropositional versus propositional.

The notion of pure experience (junsui kuiken) to interpret and understand kensho was introduced by Nishida Kitaro in his An Inquiry into the Good (1911), under influence of "his somewhat idiosyncratic reading of western philosophy", especially William James, who wrote The Varieties of Religious Experience. (Note: Victor Sogen Hori notes that Nishida Kitaro, although using a western terminology, tried to express basic Mahayana Teachings: "He borrowed, for example, the term, junsui keiken, "pure experience", from William James, but then went on to say that, while for James the individual preceded pure experience, for him, pure experience preceded the individual. That reversal makes Nishida's notion of pure experience resemble less the psychology of William James and more the Mahayana notion of sunyata.) Wayne Proudfoot traces the roots of the notion of "religious experience" to the German theologian Friedrich Schleiermacher (1768–1834), who argued that religion is based on a feeling of the infinite. The notion of "religious experience" was used by Schleiermacher to defend religion against the growing scientific and secular critique. It was adopted by many scholars of religion, of which William James was the most influential. (Note: James also gives descriptions of conversion experiences. The Christian model of dramatic conversions, based on the role-model of Paul's conversion, may also have served as a model for western interpretations and expectations regarding kensho, similar to Protestant influences on Theravada Buddhism, as described by Carrithers: "It rests upon the notion of the primacy of religious experiences, preferably spectacular ones, as the origin and legitimization of religious action. But this presupposition has a natural home, not in Buddhism, but in Christian and especially Protestant Christian movements which prescribe a radical conversion." See Sekida for an example of this influence of William James and Christian conversion stories, mentioning Luther and St. Paul. See also McMahan for the influence of Christian thought on Buddhism.) D.T. Suzuki, who introduced Nishida Kitaro to western philosophy, took over this notion of pure experience, describing it as the essence of all religions, but best represented in what he considered the "superior Japanese culture and religion".

The influence of western psychology and philosophy on Japanese Buddhism was due to the persecution of Buddhism at the beginning of the Meiji Restoration, and the subsequent efforts to construct a New Buddhism (shin bukkyo), adapted to the modern times. It was this New Buddhism which has shaped the understanding of Zen in the west, especially through the writings of D.T. Suzuki and the Sanbo Kyodan, an exponent of the Meiji-era opening of Zen-training for lay-followers.

The notion of "experience" has been criticised. Robert Sharf points out that "experience" is a typical western term, which has found its way into Asian religiosity via western influences. (Note: Robert Sharf: "[T]he role of experience in the history of Buddhism has been greatly exaggerated in contemporary scholarship. Both historical and ethnographic evidence suggests that the privileging of experience may well be traced to certain twentieth-century reform movements, notably those that urge a return to zazen or vipassana meditation, and these reforms were profoundly influenced by religious developments in the west [...] While some adepts may indeed experience "altered states" in the course of their training, critical analysis shows that such states do not constitute the reference pont for the elaborate Buddhist discourse pertaining to the "path".) The notion of "experience" introduces a false notion of duality between "experiencer" and "experienced", where-as the essence of kensho is the realisation of the "non-duality" of observer and observed. "Pure experience" does not exist; all experience is mediated by intellectual and cognitive activity. The specific teachings and practices of a specific tradition may even determine what "experience" someone has, which means that this "experience" is not the proof of the teaching, but a result of the teaching. A pure consciousness without concepts, reached by "cleaning the doors of perception" (Note: William Blake: "If the doors of perception were cleansed every thing would appear to man as it is, infinite. For man has closed himself up, till he sees all things thru' narrow chinks of his cavern."), would be an overwhelming chaos of sensory input without coherence.

Ama Samy describes the notion of kensho-experience or awakening-experience as inherently dualistic and misguided:

How is this [awakening] offered to us? Does it come to us as a sudden blinding flash of light, as a great feeling of bliss, as a sudden ecstasy, in short, as some sort of experience? Is it an ‘experience’ that we come to in zazen? [...] People tend to hanker after experiences in meditation, the more psychedelic the better. ‘Having an experience’ is no big deal; a hard thump on the head, a dose of drugs, asphyxiation or deprivation of oxygen, autosuggestion or hypnosis can give you great ‘experiences’. Sometimes, people talk glibly of having had ‘an experience of Emptiness’. But the point we concern ourselves with is: who was there to have it?

Daoxin remarks on the experience of "seeing emptiness":

The practice of bodhisattvas has emptiness as its realization: when beginning students see emptiness, this is seeing emptiness, it is not real emptiness. Those who cultivate the Way and attain real emptiness do not see emptiness or nonemptiness; they have no views.

The notion of "experience" also overemphasises kensho, as if it were the single goal of Zen-training, where-as the Zen-tradition clearly states that "the stink of Zen" has to be removed and the "experience" of kensho has to be integrated into daily life. In the Rinzai-school this post-satori training includes the study and mastering of great amounts of classical Chinese poetry, which is far from "universal" and culture-transcending. On the contrary, it demands an education in culture-specific language and behaviour, which is measured by specific and strict cultural norms. Emphasising "experience" "reduces the sophisticated dialectic of Ch'an/Zen doctrine and praxis to a mere "means" or set of techniques intended to inculcate such experiences".

== Kenshō accounts ==
=== Classical accounts ===
Classical Zen texts, such as the Kao-seng-chuan (Biographies of Eminent Monks) and the transmission lists, called "Transmission of the Lamp" (Note: A literary device to establish a lineage. Both T'ien Tai and Chán took over this literary device, to lend authority to those developing traditions, and guarantee its authenticity. Notable examples are the Anthology of the Patriarchal Hall (952) and the Jingde Records of the Transmission of the Lamp (published 1004). McRae considers Dumoulin's A History of Zen to be a modern example of this genre, disguished as scientific history;) the yü-lü genre (the recorded sayings of the masters, such as the Línjì yǔlù); and the various koan-collections, (Note: The two best known koan-collections (in the west) are the "Gateless Gate" and the "Blue Cliff Record". The Gateless Gate (Chinese: 無門關 Wumenguan; Japanese: Mumonkan) is a collection of 48 kōans and commentaries published in 1228 by Chinese monk Wumen (無門) (1183–1260). The title may be more accurately rendered as Gateless Barrier or Gateless Checkpoint. The Blue Cliff Record (Chinese: 碧巖錄 Bìyán Lù; Japanese: Hekiganroku) is a collection of 100 kōans compiled in 1125 by Yuanwu Keqin (圜悟克勤 1063–1135).) contain accounts of "enlightenment experiences". These accounts are not verbatim recordings of such "experiences", but well-edited texts, written down decades after the supposed sayings and meetings.

The Denkōroku, "The Record of the Transmission of the Light", written by Keizan Jōkin 瑩山紹瑾 (1268–1325), is an example of the "Transmission of the Lamp" genre. It contains literary accounts of the patriarchs of the Soto-lineage, from Shakyamuni Buddha to Koun Ejō, in which kensho plays a central role. They are not to be taken as literal accounts of awakening, but as stories underpinning the legitimacy of the Dogen-shu, which in its early history had seen a fierce internal conflict over the correct lineage during the Sandai sōron. (Note: Cook: "It is probably safe to say that few if any reputable modern scholars, and probably not many even within the Soto priesthood itself, believe that many of the central events and characters in the Denkoroku are based on historical fact [...] The origins and early developments of Chinese Zen are just now becoming clearer, and the gradually emerging picture is very different from the traditional Zen history found in such works as Keizan's record".)

Dōgen Zenji's awakening is recalled in the Denkoroku:

Once, during late-night zazen, Rujing told the monks, "Studying Zen is the dropping off of body and mind." Hearing this, the master was suddenly greatly awakened. He went at once to the Abbott's room and burned incense. Rujing asked him, "Why are you burning incense?" The master answered, "Body and mind have dropped off." Rujing said, "Body and mind have dropped off, the dropped-off body and mind." The master said, "This is a temporarily ability; you must not approve me without reason." Rujing replied, "I am not approving you without reason." The master asked, "Why are you not approving me without reason?" Rujing said, "You dropped off body and mind." The master bowed. Rujing said, "You have dropped off dropping off."

Hakuin gives this description of his first kensho, when he was 21:

At around midnight on the seventh and final night of my practice, the boom of a bell from a distant temple reached my ears: suddenly, my body and mind dropped completely away. I rose clear of even the finest dust. Overwhelmed with joy, I hollered out at the top of my lungs, "Old Yen-t'ou is alive and well! [...] After that, however, I became extremely proud and arrogant".

Hakuin's kensho was not approved by Shoju Rojin, who subjected Hakuin to more koan-training. This resulted in a second kensho, where-after Hakuin left Shoju Rojin. It was only when he was 41 that he attained "his final great enlightenment":

[W]hen Shoju had asked his reason for becoming a monk, his reply – that he had done it because he was afraid of falling into hell – had brought the scornful retort: "You're a self-centered rascal, aren't you!" Not until eighteen years later, upon attainment of his final great enlightenment at the age of forty-one, would Hakuin fully grasp the significance of Shoju's reproach and with it the true meaning of "post-satori" practice. Years later, when Hakuin asked his student Tōrei the same question, Tōrei's answer – "To work for the salvation of my fellow beings" – brought a laugh from Hakuin. "A much better reason than mine", he said.

=== Contemporary accounts ===
Although the Zen tradition is reluctant to speak openly about the 'experience' of kensho, personal accounts can be found in Zen texts. (Note: Kapleau gives ten different accounts of contemporary practitioners, including his own kensho under the initials "KP". Sekida gives an elaborate account of his own kenshos, and gives various accounts of others. Satomi gives an account of becoming one with the mu-koan, the classical aimed kensho of the Sanbo Kyodan. Maura O'Halloran also gives an account of herself becoming mu.) Keido Fukushima, a 20th-century Rinzai abbott, gives the following description:

At Nanzenji there is a small hill. I used to walk near there, look at it, and often smile at the high school students who walked by there as well. One day as I walked by, I looked at the hill and it was truly amazing. I was totally lost as if there was no 'me'. I stood gazing at the hill. Some students walked by and one of them said something like 'look at that crazy monk'. Finally I came out of it. Life was never the same for me. I was free. (Note: Harris: "After this experience Gensho still had two more years of koan study".)

=== Spontaneous kenshō ===
Kenshō may be attained without the aid of a teacher. For example, Richard Clarke (1933), who studied with Philip Kapleau, states that he had a spontaneous kensho when he was 13. (Note: Japanischer Buddhismus in Amerika. Chronik Ab 1970) Dennis Genpo Merzel states he had what he described as an "awakening experience" in 1971: (Note: Big Mind: An Interview with Genpo Roshi)

It was in February of that year, and I was 26 years old. My second serious relationship was ending, and I was feeling very confined and conflicted. I needed to get some space, so I went out to the Mojave desert for a three-day camping weekend with two friends. On the Friday, I hiked up a mountain alone. I knew nothing about meditation or spiritual practice. I was just sitting there, thinking about my life and the things going on. I felt I had gotten pretty screwed up for such a young age.

I could see my VW camper, my home for the weekend, parked a few miles away. But at the same time, I was aware that my home was back in Long Beach, California. And a natural koan came to me: Where is home? All of a sudden, I had a kind of breakthrough. I felt myself fall away, and I became one with the cosmos, one with the universe, one with all things. I knew in that moment that wherever I am, that is home; home is everywhere. I also knew who I was, beyond description, but let's call it Big Mind.

That experience completely changed my life.

More descriptions of "spontaneous kensho" can be found throughout the Zen-literature, (Note: Sekida gives the example of a woman, whose "strong internal pressure (gidan) never stopped knocking from within at the door of her mind, demanding to be resolved [...] One day, when she was about to take a bath, a certain change occurred in her. Although this was later confirmed as kensho by a teacher, she had no idea what it was. Philip Kapleau describes a man who had kensho, which was explained as a "conversion experience" by psychiatrists. Flora Courtois gives an extensive account of her spontaneous kensho, on which Yasutani comments.)

=== Alternate accounts ===
Houn Jiyu-Kennett, a 20th-century Soto Zen Oshō, i.e. "priest" or "teacher," and the first Western female Zen priest, had a prolonged religious experience in the 1970s, including a series of visions and recalling past lives, when she was severely ill. She regarded these experiences as "a profound kensho (enlightenment) experience," constituting a third kensho, and published an account of these visions, and an elaborate scheme of stages of awakening, in How to Grow a Lotus Blossom. Her interpretations, which parallel Christian mysticism, were controversial, and rejected by some as makyo ("illusion"). According to Jiyu-Kennett, such experiences are not uncommon, (Note: According to Kay, "Kennett's visionary experiences – and also her ambivalence about the status of their content – are not unprecedented within the Zen tradition." Soto literature includes numerous accounts, as noted especially by Faure (2001) Visions of powere. described by the founders of Soto Zen, Dogen and Keizan. See also Williams (2005) and Bodiford (1993). Yet, Dogen and Keizan "also both warned against seeing visions or unusual spiritual experiences as the goal of practice.") but are rarely spoken of; she regarded publishing her own experiences as a way to acknowledge the existence and validity of such experiences, which, according to her, may contribute to further insight after initial awakening. She acknowledged the risks and potential for controversy in publishing her account, but felt that the benefits of releasing such information outweighed the risks.

== Training towards kenshō ==
According to Harris, working towards kensho is usually a lengthy process stretched out over years or even decades. Contrary to this, Victor Hori notes that with koan-study kensho may appear within six months. (Note: Houn Jiyu-Kennett, a western sei-kyoshi or soto-priest, also is reported to have attained kensho after six months of training in a Soto-monastery.)

Sōtō tends towards a gradual approach, preferring to let the experiences happen on their own. Rinzai tends toward the use of Koans as a technique to unroot the habitual workings of the mind.

During intensive zazen various hallucinations and psychological disturbances may arise. These are referred to as makyo. Distinguishing these delusions from actual kensho is the primary function of the teacher, as the student may be erroneously convinced they have realized kensho.

=== Rinzai ===
In the Rinzai school, kensho is seen as indispensable:

At some point in time we pass from imprisonment in ignorance and delusion to a true vision of Zen realization: "Our enlightenment is timeless, yet our realization of it occurs in time." According to this belief experiencing a moment of awakening in this life is of central importance.

In the Rinzai-training, the student is expected to pour oneself totally into both koan-study and daily activities 'to become one' with it. Kenshō is used to describe the first breakthrough in kōan study. (Note: See for a description of 'becoming one with'.)

=== Sōtō ===
Contemporary Japanese Sōtō downplays the importance of kenshō, due to the sectarian rivalry with Rinzai, which emphasizes kenshō. Nevertheless, kenshō also has its role in Sōtō. The "genjo-koan", or the "koan of everyday life" which "appears naturally in daily life", is emphasized. Students are not encouraged to actively seek out kenshō experiences. In Sōtō practice kenshōs "are allowed to occur naturally, as a by-product of practice. Meditative training is seen as the unfolding of one great kenshō:

According to the tradition of Soto Zen, although working on a koan is one way of attaining kensho, the best way is zazen. Indeed, Dogen, the founder of Soto Zen, expounded that zazen itself is enlightenment, and as long as the adept maintains a pure state of non-thinking in Zen, he is a Buddha.

According to Brad Warner, in the Sōtō school there are two kinds of awakening. One is the practice of shikantaza, which is the "actual enlightened activity of the Buddha". The other is the accumulation of little bits of understanding, which come together, giving way to a deeper intuitive knowledge.

=== Sanbō Kyōdan ===
Kenshō also plays a central in the Sanbō Kyōdan, a Japanese Zen organisation which played a decisive role in the transmission of Zen to the United States. Yasutani, the founder of the Sanbo Kyodan, was disappointed about the lack of interest in kensho in the Soto school. Yasutani's emphasis on koan training and the importance of kensho was transmitted to his American students:

He was especially vocal concerning the point of kenshō, seeing one's true nature. He spoke more openly about it then anyone of his times, going so far as to have a public acknowledgement of those who had experienced kensho in a post-sesshin ceremony of bowing in gratitude to the three treasures.

It is also reflected in the inclusion of a relative great number of kensho stories in "The Three Pillars of Zen", written by Philip Kapleau, a student of Yasutani.

== Training after kenshō ==
After kensho, further practice is needed to attain a natural, effortless, down-to-earth state of being, the "ultimate liberation", "knowing without any kind of defilement". Kensho may bring insight, but not change the mental dispositions, a shortcoming experienced by both Hakuin and modern teachers like Jack Kornfield and Barry Magid.

=== Further practice ===
Zen Buddhist training does not end with kenshō. Practice is to be continued to deepen the insight and to express it in daily life. According to the contemporary Chan Master Sheng Yen:

Ch'an expressions refer to enlightenment as "seeing your self-nature". But even this is not enough. After seeing your self-nature, you need to deepen your experience even further and bring it into maturation. You should have enlightenment experience again and again and support them with continuous practice. Even though Ch'an says that at the time of enlightenment, your outlook is the same as of the Buddha, you are not yet a full Buddha.

And the Soto Zen Master Jiyu-Kennett:

One can easily get the impression that realization, kenshō, an experience of enlightenment, or however you wish to phrase it, is the end of Zen training. It is not. It is, rather, a new beginning, an entrance into a more mature phase of Buddhist training. To take it as an ending, and to "dine out" on such an experience without doing the training that will deepen and extend it, is one of the greatest tragedies of which I know. There must be continuous development, otherwise you will be as a wooden statue sitting upon a plinth to be dusted, and the life of Buddha will not increase.

To deepen the initial insight of kensho, shikantaza and kōan-study are necessary. This trajectory of initial insight followed by a gradual deepening and ripening is expressed by Linji Yixuan in his Three Mysterious Gates, Dongshan Liangjie's (Japanese: Tōzan Ryōkan) Five Ranks, the Four Ways of Knowing of Hakuin, and the Ten Ox-Herding Pictures which detail the steps on the Path.

=== Seitai choyo ===
Post-awakening practice is called seitai choyo, the "long nurturing of the sacred fetus". (Note: According to Kraft, one of the earliest expressions of this term is found in a 5th-century Chinese translation of the Prajnaparamitra Sutra on Benevolent Kings Protecting Their Countries. In Chán-texts the term is first used by Mazu (709–788), and in Japan it was introduced by Dogen who learned it from his teacher T'ien t'ung Ju-ching (1163–1228). See also Muso Soseki, Dialogues in a Dream translation, translated by Thomas Yuho Kirchner, for its meaning and application.) According to Spiegelberg,

[I]t means a return to the purely secular life, a complete submersion in work and in the changing events of the world. Thus, for decades, many Zenists, after their awakening, went among the people, living among beggars and leading an existence of hard physical labor. Thus it was proved whether or not the truth received was of permanent value, or whether it would vanish among mundane affairs.

During the T'ang-era, the term became associated with the ideal of the recluse who leaves the world. An ideal period of "twenty years" was taken for it, echoing a story from the Lotus Sutra about a prodigal son who wandered in poverty for twenty years before returning home. References to these twenty years are found throughout the Chán-tradition, for example Linji, who is reported to have studied under Huang-po for twenty years, and Daito, the founder of Daitoku-ji, who famously spent twenty years living under a bridge with beggars.

=== Cultivating bodhicitta ===
According to Hakuin, the main aim of "post-satori practice" (gogo no shugyo or kojo, "going beyond") is to cultivate the "Mind of Enlightenment", "benefiting others by giving them the gift of the Dharma teaching". (Note: Shinkichi Takahashi: "After satori, teach.") According to Yamada Koun, "if you cannot weep with a person who is crying, there is no kensho". According to Kay,

The intuitive realisation of Buddhahood requires an attitude of selflessness and faith in one's inherent enlightenment. Meditative awakening, or wisdom, forms only part of this realisation that must also manifest itself through acts of compassion and love.

According to Barry, regarding Hakuin's practice after awakening,

Post-satori practice for Hakuin meant finally ceasing to be preoccupied with his own personal condition and attainment and to devote himself and his practice to helping and teaching others. Finally, at long last, he realized that true enlightenment is a matter of endless practice and compassionate functioning, not something that occurs once and for all in one great moment on the cushion. (Note: See also Katsuhiro Yoshizawa, The Religious Art of Zen Master Hakuin, pp.41–45, "Constant practice of the Four Universal Vows".)

=== Self-purification and intellectual understanding ===
One also has to purify oneself by ongoing practice, since

Kensho does not eradicate our unhealthy habits [...] There is a sudden awakening to the fact of "no-self" and then this insight has to be integrated into one's life which means that it has to be embodied and not just be a memory. (Note: Gerry Reply by Gerry Shishin Wick)

And "experience" has to be supplemented by intellectual understanding and study of the Buddhist teachings; otherwise one remains a zen temma, a "Zen devil".

== Sudden insight ==
Kenshō is described as appearing suddenly, upon an interaction with someone else, at hearing or reading some significant phrase, or at the perceiving of an unexpected sound or sight. The idea of "sudden insight" has been hotly debated in the history of Zen. It became part of the Traditional Zen Narrative in the 8th century.

Chinul, a 12th-century Korean Seon master, emphasized that insight into our true nature is sudden, but is to be followed by practice to ripen the insight and attain full Buddhahood. The contemporary Korean Seon master Seongcheol opposed this, emphasizing "sudden enlightenment, sudden cultivation". But Jiyu-Kennett, a contemporary western teacher, warns that attaining kenshō does not mean that a person is free from morality, the laws of karma, or the consequences of ones actions. This warning is reflected in the Wild fox koan.

== Mushi-dokugo and mushi-dokkaku ==
Kenshō may be attained without the aid of a teacher, as in the case of mushi-dokugo or (mushi-)dokkaku, a self-awakened pratyeka-buddha. (Note: Kyosho. The Awakening Gong. No.350, September/October 2011. Pages 14–15)

Though the literal meaning is self-awakened or awakened on one's own, the emphasis in Zen, when using these terms, lies in the ultimate reliance on one's own insight, instead of the authority of a teacher:

It is awakening that is one's true master. With Shakyamuni, the awakening was his master. In other words, the awakened self is one's master. Apart from getting awakened to that master, there is no awakening. Here practitioner and master are of one body, not two. Instead of having another verify or confirm one's awakening, one does so for oneself. Of course in this case the self that is verified and the master who does verification are undivided. In their being completely identical is the autonomous, independent, or ultimate nature of the authenticity. (Note: Shin'ichi Hisamatsu, On Mutually Going Into The Matter Of Self)

== Similarities with other traditions ==
While the Japanese term "kenshō" is generally used by practitioners of Zen Buddhism, the insight it refers to is not limited to Japanese Zen Buddhism, or even to Buddhism in general.

=== Theravada ===
The Theravada tradition, which is best known in the west through the modern Vipassana movement, discerns four stages of enlightenment, in which Nirvana is reached in four succeeding sudden steps of insight.

=== Dzogchen ===
An analogy given by Dzogchen masters is that one's nature is like a mirror which reflects with complete openness, but is not affected by the reflections. Rigpa is the knowledge that ensues from recognizing this mirror-like clarity, which cannot be found by searching nor identified. One knows that there is a primordial freedom from grasping his or her mind.

=== Advaita Vedanta ===
In Advaita Vedanta moksha is attained by jnana, insight-knowledge. In Shankara's philosophical synthesis insight samadhi is used as a subsidiary to this goal. Swami Vivekananda emphasized the experience of nirvikalpa samadhi as a means to validate religious, transcendental knowledge.

== See also ==
- Enlightenment in Buddhism
- Satori
- Daigo
- Mushi dokugo
- Shoshin
- Epiphany
- Samadhi
- Gnosis

== Sources ==
=== Printed sources ===
- Baroni, Helen J. (2002). The Illustrated Encyclopedia of Zen Buddhism. The Rosen Publishing Group, Inc. ISBN 0-8239-2240-5.
- Bhikkhu, Thanissaro (1997), Samaññaphala Sutta: The Fruits of the Contemplative Life.
- Sakka-pañha Sutta: Sakka's Questions (excerpt) (DN 21), translated by Bikkhu, Thannssaro, 1999
- Bikkhu, Thanissaro (2012), The Truth of Rebirth: And Why it Matters for Buddhist Practice, Valley Center, CA: Metta Forest Monastery
- Bluck, Robert (2006), British Buddhism: Teachings, Practice And Development, Taylor & Francis
- Bodiford, William M. (1993). Sōtō Zen in Medieval Japan. University of Hawaii Press. ISBN 0-8248-1482-7.
- Borup, Jorn (n.d.), Zen and the Art of inverting Orientalism: religious studies and genealogical networks
- Carrithers, Michael (1983), The Forest Monks of Sri Lanka
- Chappell, David W. (1993), Hermeneutical Phases in Chinese Buddhism. In: Donald S. Lopez, Jr. (ed.)(1993), Buddhist Hermeneutics, Delhi: Motilal Banarsidass
- Chisan, Kohō (1976), Jōsai Daishi Zenshū, Yokohama, Japan: Daihonzan Sōjiji
- Comans, Michael (1993), The Question of the Importance of Samadhi in Modern and Classical Advaita Vedanta. In: Philosophy East and West Vol. 43, No. 1 (Jan. 1993), pp. 19–38.
- Cook, Francis Dojun (vertaler) (2003), The Record of Transmitting the Light. Zen Master Keizan's Denkoroku, Boston: Wisdom Publications
- Cleary, Thomas (1986), Introduction to "Shōbōgenzō, Zen Essays by Dōgen", Honolulu, Hawaii: University of Hawaii Press
- DeVisser, M. W. (1923), The Arhats in China and Japan, Berlin: Oesterheld
- Dogen (n.d.), Rules for Meditation (Fukanzazengi) (PDF)
- Dogen, Eihei (1983). Shobogenzo. Rev. Hubert Nearman (Dr. Mark J. Nearman) (trans.). Shasta Abbey Press. ISBN 978-0-930066-27-7. Archived from the original on January 11, 2010.
- Dōshū, Ōkubo (1969–1970), Dōgen Zenji Zenshū (2 ed.), Tokyo: Chikuma Shobō
- Dumoulin, Heinrich (2005b), Zen Buddhism: A History. Volume 2: Japan, World Wisdom Books, ISBN 9780941532907
- Eihei-ji Temple Staff (1994), Sanshō, the Magazine of Eihei-ji Temple, vol. November, Fukui, Japan: Eihei-ji Temple Press
- Faure, Bernard (2001), Visions of Power. Imaging Medieval Japanese Buddhism, Princeton, New Jersey: Princeton University Press
- Fischer-Schreiber, Ingrid; Ehrhard, Franz-Karl; Diener, Michael S. (1991), The Shambhala dictionary of Buddhism and Zen, Translated by M. H. Kohn, Boston: Shambhala
- Ford, John Ismael (2006), Zen Master Who?: A Guide to the People and Stories of Zen, Simon and Schuster
- Fowler, Merv (2005), Zen Buddhism: Beliefs and Practices, Sussex Academic Press
- Greenwell, Bonnie (2002), Energies of Transformation: A Guide to the Kundalini Process, Motilal Banarsidass
- Grimstone, A.V. (1985), Edotor's Introduction to Skida's "Zen Training. Methods and Philosophy", New York, Tokyo: Weatherhill
- Hakuin, Ekaku (2010), Wild Ivy: The Spiritual Autobiography of Zen Master Hakuin, Translated by Norman Waddell, Shambhala Publications
- Hardy, R. Spence (2002) [1st pub. 1853], A Manual of Buddhism, Aryan Books International
- Harris, Ishwar C. (2004), The Laughing Buddha of Tofukuji: The Life of Zen Master Keidō Fukushima, Bloomington, Indiana: World Wisdom, ISBN 978-0-941532-62-4
- Harvey, Peter (1990). An Introduction to Buddhism: Teachings, History and Practices. Cambridge University Press. ISBN 0-521-31333-3.
- Heine, Steven; Dale S. Wright (2000). The Koan: Texts and Contexts in Zen Buddhism. Oxford University Press. ISBN 0-19-511748-4.
- Hisamatsu, Shinʼichi (2002), Critical Sermons of the Zen Tradition: Hisamatsu's Talks on Linji, University of Hawaii Press
- Hori, Victor Sogen (1994), Teaching and Learning in the Zen Rinzai Monastery. In: Journal of Japanese Studies, Vol.20, No. 1, (Winter, 1994), 5–35 (PDF), archived from the original on October 25, 2019
- Hori, Victor Sogen (1999), Translating the Zen Phrase Book. In: Nanzan Bulletin 23 (1999) (PDF), pp. 44–58
- Hori, Victor Sogen (2000), Koan and Kensho in the Rinzai Zen Curriculum. In: Steven Heine and Dale S. Wright (eds)(2000): "The Koan. Texts and Contexts in Zen Buddhism, Oxford: Oxford University Press
- Hori, Victor Sogen (2006), The Steps of Koan Practice. In: John Daido Loori, Thomas Yuho Kirchner (eds), Sitting With Koans: Essential Writings on Zen Koan Introspection, Wisdom Publications
- Ishida, M (1964), Japanese Buddhist Prints, translated by Nearman, Hubert, New York: Abrams
- Jaffe, Paul David (1979), Yasutani Hakuun Roshi – a biographical note
- Jiyu-Kennett (1979), The Book of Life, Shasty Abbey Press
- Jiyu-Kennett (1993), How to Grow a Lotus Blossom: Or How a Zen Buddhist Prepares for Death, Shasta Abbey Press
- Jiyu-Kennett (2001), Introduction to the Denkōroku. In: The Denkōroku, The Record of the Transmission of the Light, Shasta Abbey Press
- Jiyu-Kennett, Houn (2005a), Roar of the Tigress VOLUME I. An Introduction to Zen: Religious Practice for Everyday Life (PDF), MOUNT SHASTA, CALIFORNIA: SHASTA ABBEY PRESS
- Jiyu-Kennett, Houn (2005b), Roar of the Tigress VOLUME II. Zen for Spiritual Adults. Lectures Inspired by the Shōbōgenzō of Eihei Dōgen (PDF), MOUNT SHASTA, CALIFORNIA: SHASTA ABBEY PRESS
- Jōkin, Zen Master Keizan (2001), The Denkōroku, The Record of the Transmission of the Light, Shasta Abbey Press, ISBN 0-930066-22-7
- Kapleau, Philip (1980), Zen. Dawn in the West, Anchor Books
- Kapleau, Philip (1989), The three pillars of Zen
- Kasulis, Thomas P. (2003), Ch'an Spirituality. In: Buddhist Spirituality. Later China, Korea, Japan and the Modern World; edited by Takeuchi Yoshinori, Delhi: Motilal Banarsidass
- Kato, K (1994), "The Life of Zen Master Dōgen (Illustrated)", Zen Fountains, Taishōji Sōtō Mission, Hilo, Hawaii, by permission of the Sōtōshū Shūmuchō, Tokyo
- Kay, David N. (2007), Tibetan and Zen Buddhism in Britain: Transplantation, Development and Adaptation, Routledge
- Kiew Kit, Wong (2002), The Complete Book of Zen, Tuttle Publishing, ISBN 0-8048-3441-5
- Kim, Hee-Jin (2007), Dōgen on Meditation and Thinking: A Reflection on His View of Zen, SUNY Press
- Kraft, Kenneth (1988). Zen: Tradition and Transition. Grove Press. ISBN 0-8021-3162-X.
- Kraft, Kenneth (1997), Eloquent Zen: Daitō and Early Japanese Zen, University of Hawaii Press
- The Lotus Sutra of Wondrous Dharma, translated by Kuan, Cheng, Taipei, Taiwan: Neo-carefree Garden Buddhist Canon Translation Institute, 2014
- Lachs, Stuart (2012), Hua-t'ou : A Method of Zen Meditation (PDF), archived (PDF) from the original on September 21, 2013
- Lathouwers, Ton (2000), Meer dan een mens kan doen. Zentoespraken, Rotterdam: Asoka
- The Śūrangama Sūtra, translated by Luk, Charles, Singapore: Amitabha Buddhist Society, 1999 [1st pub. 1967]
- Low, Albert (2006), Hakuin on Kensho. The Four Ways of Knowing, Boston & London: Shambhala
- MacInnes, Elaine (2007), The Flowing Bridge: Guidance on Beginning Zen Koans, Wisdom Publications
- MacPhillamy, Daizui; Roberson, Zenshō; Benson, Kōten; Nearman, Hubert (1997), "YUME: Visionary Experience in the Lives of Great Masters Dōgen and Keizan", The Journal of the Order of Buddhist Contemplatives, 12 (2), Shasta Abbey Press
- Maezumi, Hakuyu Taizan; Glassman, Bernie (2007), The Hazy Moon of Enlightenment: Part of the On Zen Practice Series, Wisdom Publications
- McMahan, David L. (2008), The Making of Buddhist Modernism, Oxford: Oxford University Press, ISBN 9780195183276
- McRae, John (2003), Seeing Through Zen. Encounter, Transformation, and Genealogy in Chinese Chan Buddhism, The University Press Group Ltd, ISBN 9780520237988
- McRae, John (2005), Critical introduction by John McRae to the reprint of Dumoulin's A history of Zen (PDF), archived (PDF) from the original on November 11, 2011
- McRae, John (2008), THE PLATFORM SUTRA OF THE SIXTH PATRIARCH. Translated from the Chinese of Zongbao (Taishō Volume 48, Number 2008) by John R. McRae (PDF)
- Mohr, Michel (2000), Emerging from Nonduality. Koan Practice in the Rinzai Tradition since Hakuin. In: steven Heine & Dale S. Wright (eds.)(2000), "The Koan. texts and Contexts in Zen Buddhism", Oxford: Oxford University Press
- Morgan, Diane (2004), The Buddhist Experience in America, Greenwood Publishing Group
- Muller, A. Charles, ed. (n.d.), Digital Dictionary of Buddhism
- Mumon, Yamada (2004), Lectures On The Ten Oxherding Pictures, University of Hawaii Press
- Namdak, Tenzin (2006), Bonpo Dzogchen Teachings, Vajra Publications
- O'Halloran, Maura (2007), Pure Heart, Enlightened Mind: The Life and Letters of an Irish Zen Saint, Wisdom Publications
- Osto, Douglas (2016), Altered States: Buddhism and Psychedelic Spirituality in America, Columbia University Press
- Samy, AMA (1998), Waarom kwam Bodhidharma naar het Westen? De ontmoeting van Zen met het Westen, Asoka: Asoka
- Samy, Ama (2014). "Kapitel 12: Koan, Hua-t'ou und Kensho". ZEN – Der große Weg ist ohne Tor [ZEN – The Great Way Has No Gate] (in German). Theseus Verlag. ISBN 978-3-89901-812-7.
- Samy, Ama (2015) [2002]. Zen Heart, Zen Mind: The Teachings Of Zen Master Ama Samy. Chennai, India: Cre-A. ISBN 978-81-85602-81-3.
- Satomi, Myodo; King, Sallie B. (1993), Journey in Search of the Way: The Spiritual Autobiography of Satomi Myodo, State University of New York Press, ISBN 0-7914-1971-1
- Sekida, Katsuki (1985), Zen Training. Methods and Philosophy, New York, Tokyo: Weatherhill
- Two Zen Classics. Mumonkan, The Gateless Gate. Hekiganroku, The Blue Cliff Records. Translated with commentaries by Katsuki Sekida, translated by Sekida, Katsuki, New York / Tokyo: Weatherhill, 1996
- Senzaki, Nyogen; Shimano, Eido (2005). Like a Dream, Like a Fantasy: The Zen Teachings and Translations of Nyogen Senzaki. Wisdom Publications. ISBN 0-86171-280-3.
- Sharf, Robert H. (August 1993), "The Zen of Japanese Nationalism", History of Religions, 33 (1): 1–43, doi:10.1086/463354, S2CID 161535877
- Sharf, Robert H. (1995a), Whose Zen? Zen Nationalism Revisited (PDF)
- Sharf, Robert H. (1995b), "Buddhist Modernism and the Rhetoric of Meditative Experience" (PDF), NUMEN, 42 (3): 228–283, doi:10.1163/1568527952598549, hdl:2027.42/43810, archived from the original (PDF) on April 12, 2019
- Sharf, Robert H. (1995c), "Sanbokyodan. Zen and the Way of the New Religions" (PDF), Japanese Journal of Religious Studies, 22 (3–4), doi:10.18874/jjrs.22.3-4.1995.417-458
- Sharf, Robert H. (2000), "The Rhetoric of Experience and the Study of Religion" (PDF), Journal of Consciousness Studies, 7 (11–12): 267–87, archived from the original (PDF) on May 13, 2013
- Sharf, Robert (October 2014), "Mindfullness and Mindlessness in Early Chan" (PDF), Philosophy East & West, 64 (4): 933–964, doi:10.1353/pew.2014.0074, S2CID 144208166
- Soothill, William Edward; Hodous, Lewis (1934), A Dictionary of Chinese Buddhist Terms, Motilal Banarsidass
- Spiegelberg, Frederic (1957), Living Religions of the World, Thames and Hudson
- Suzuki, D.T. (1994a), An Introduction to Zen Buddhism, Grove Press
- Suzuki, D.T. (1994b), Essays in Zen Buddhism, Grove Press
- Takahashi, Shinkichi (2000), Triumph of the Sparrow: Zen Poems of Shinkichi Takahashi, Grove Press
- Alavaka Sutta: Discourse to Alavaka, translated by Thera, Piyadassi, 1999
- Third Dzogchen Rinpoche (2008), Great Perfection. Volume II, Snow Lion Publications
- Torei, Enji (2009), "The Chronological Biography of Zen Master Hakuin", in Waddell, Norman (ed.), Hakuin's Precious mirror Cave, Counterpoint
- Victoria, Brian Daizen (2006), Zen at war (Second ed.), Lanham e.a.: Rowman & Littlefield Publishers, Inc.
- Waddell, Norman (2010), Introduction to Wild Ivy: The Spiritual Autobiography of Zen Master Hakuin, Shambhala Publications
- Warner, Brad (2009), Zen Wrapped in Karma Dipped in Chocolate: A Trip Through Death, Sex, Divorce, and Spiritual Celebrity in Search of the True Dharma, New World Library
- Watson (n.d.), Great Master Keizan Jōkin: His Life and Legacy (PDF), Throssel Hole Buddhist Abbey
- Williams, Duncan Ryūken (2005), The Other Side of Zen: A Social History of Sōtō Zen Buddhism in Tokugawa Japan, Princeton University Press
- Welter, Albert (n.d.), The Textual History of the Linji lu (Record of Linji): The Earliest Recorded Fragments
- Yen, Chan Master Sheng (1996), Dharma Drum: The Life and Heart of Ch'an Practice, Boston & London: Shambhala
- Yoshizawa, Katsuhiro (2009), The Religious Art of Zen Master Hakuin, Counterpoint Press
