= Epiphany (feeling) =

Positive affect associated with sudden understanding

An epiphany (from the ancient Greek ἐπιφάνεια, epiphanea, "manifestation, striking appearance") is an experience of a sudden and striking realization. Generally the term is used to describe a scientific breakthrough or a religious or philosophical discovery, but it can apply in any situation in which an enlightening realization allows a problem or situation to be understood from a new and deeper perspective. Epiphanies are studied by psychologists and other scholars, particularly those attempting to study the process of innovation.

Epiphanies are relatively rare occurrences and generally follow a process of significant thought about a problem. Often they are triggered by a new and key piece of information, but importantly, a depth of prior knowledge is required to allow the leap of understanding. Famous epiphanies include Archimedes's discovery of a method to determine the volume of an irregular object ("Eureka!") and Isaac Newton's realization that a falling apple and the orbiting moon are both pulled by the same force.

== History ==
The word epiphany originally referred to insight through the divine. Today, this concept is more often used without such connotations, but a popular implication remains that the epiphany is supernatural, as the discovery seems to come suddenly from the outside.

The word's secular usage may owe much of its popularity to Irish novelist James Joyce. The Joycean epiphany has been defined as "a sudden spiritual manifestation, whether from some object, scene, event, or memorable phase of the mind – the manifestation being out of proportion to the significance or strictly logical relevance of whatever produces it". The author used epiphany as a literary device within each entry of his short story collection Dubliners (1914); his protagonists came to sudden recognitions that changed their view of themselves and/or their social conditions. Joyce had first expounded on epiphany's meaning in the fragment Stephen Hero (published posthumously in 1944). For the philosopher Emmanuel Lévinas, epiphany or a manifestation of the divine is seen in another's face (see face-to-face).

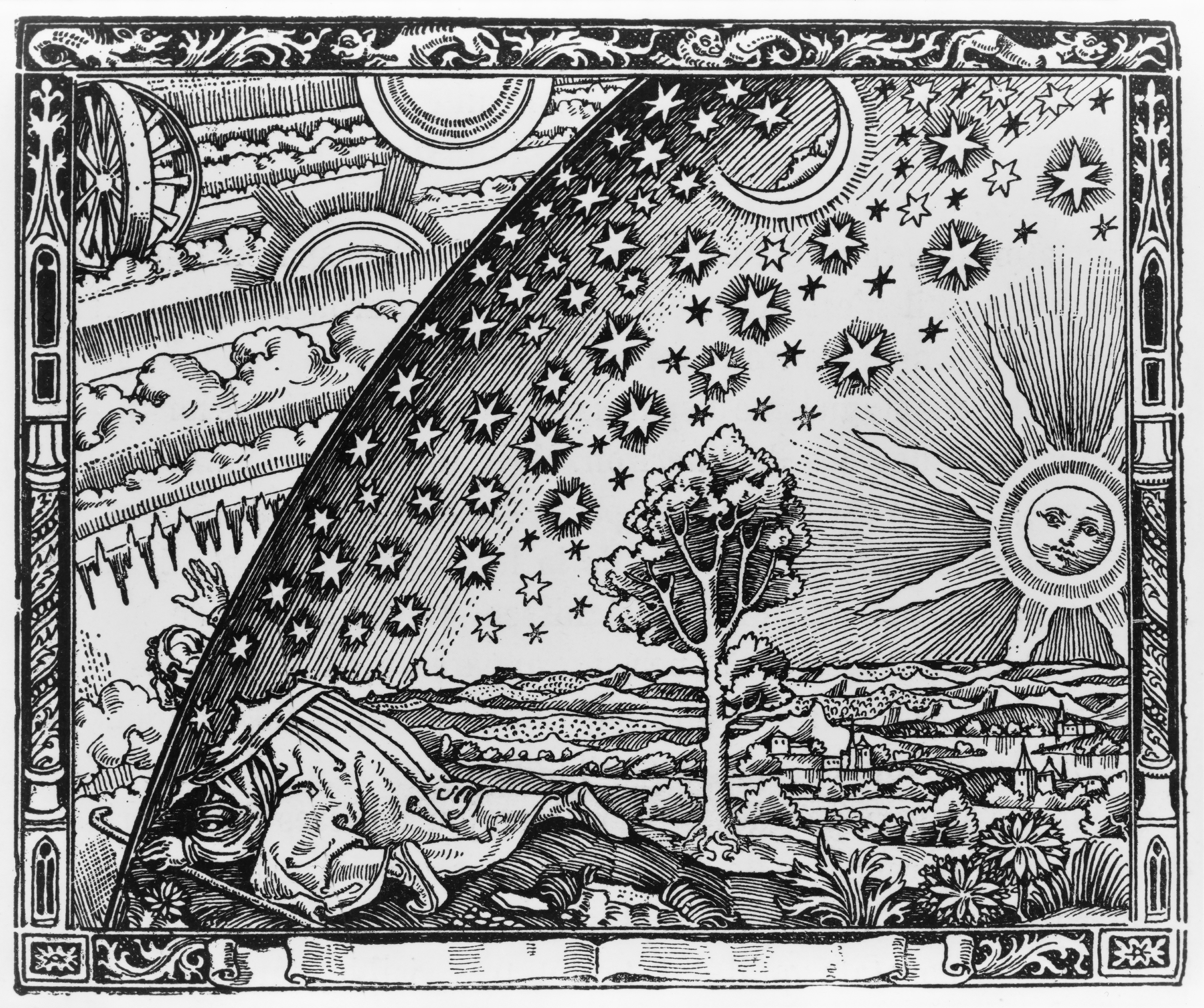
Flammarion engraving. From "L'atmosphère", book of 1888.

In traditional and pre-modern cultures, initiation rites and mystery religions have served as vehicles of epiphany, as well as the arts. The Greek dramatists and poets would, in the ideal, induct the audience into states of catharsis or kenosis, respectively. In modern times an epiphany lies behind the title of William Burroughs' Naked Lunch, a drug-influenced state, as Burroughs explained, "a frozen moment when everyone sees what is at the end of the fork." Both the Dadaist Marcel Duchamp and the Pop Artist Andy Warhol would invert expectations by presenting commonplace objects or graphics as works of fine art (for example a urinal as a fountain), simply by presenting them in a way no one had thought to do before; the result was intended to induce an epiphany of "what art is" or is not.

== Process ==
Epiphanies can come in many different forms, and are often generated by a complex combination of experience, memory, knowledge, predisposition and context. A contemporary example of an epiphany in education might involve the process by which a student arrives at some form of new insight or clarifying thought. Despite this popular image, epiphany is the result of significant work on the part of the discoverer, and is only the satisfying result of a long process. The surprising and fulfilling feeling of epiphany is so surprising because one cannot predict when one's labor will bear fruit, and our subconscious can play a significant part in delivering the solution; and is fulfilling because it is a reward for a long period of effort.

== Myth ==
A common myth predicts that most, if not all, innovations occur through epiphanies. Not all innovations occur through epiphanies; Scott Berkun notes that "the most useful way to think of an epiphany is as an occasional bonus of working on tough problems." Most innovations occur without epiphany, and epiphanies often contribute little towards finding the next one. Crucially, epiphany cannot be predicted, or controlled.

Although epiphanies are only a rare occurrence, crowning a process of significant labor, there is a common myth that epiphanies of sudden comprehension are commonly responsible for leaps in technology and the sciences. Famous epiphanies include Archimedes' realization of how to estimate the volume of a given mass, which inspired him to shout "Eureka!" ("I have found it!").

The biographies of many mathematicians and scientists include an epiphanic episode early in their career, the ramifications of which were worked out in detail over the following years. For example, allegedly Albert Einstein was struck as a young child by being given a compass, and realizing some unseen force in space was making it move. Another, perhaps better, example from Einstein's life occurred in 1905 after he had spent an evening unsuccessfully trying to reconcile Newtonian physics and Maxwell's equations. While taking a streetcar home, he looked behind him at the receding clocktower in Bern and realized that if the car sped up (close to the speed of light) he would see the clock slow down; with this thought, he later remarked, "a storm broke loose in my mind," which would allow him to understand special relativity. Einstein had a second epiphany two years later in 1907 which he called "the happiest thought of my life" when he imagined an elevator falling, and realized that a passenger would not be able to tell the difference between the weightlessness of falling, and the weightlessness of space – a thought which allowed him to generalize his theory of relativity to include gravity as a curvature in spacetime.

A similar flash of holistic understanding in a prepared mind was said to have given Charles Darwin his "hunch" (about natural selection). Darwin later said that he always remembered the spot in the road where his carriage was when the epiphany struck. Another famous epiphany myth is associated with Isaac Newton's apple story, and yet another with Nikola Tesla's discovery of a workable alternating current induction motor. Though such epiphanies might have occurred, they were almost certainly the result of long and intensive periods of study those individuals had undertaken, rather than an out-of-the-blue flash of inspiration about an issue they had not thought about previously.

Another myth is that epiphany is simply another word for (usually spiritual) vision. Actually, realism and psychology make epiphany a different mode as distinguished from vision, even though both vision and epiphany are often triggered by (sometimes seemingly) irrelevant incidents or objects.

== In religion ==
In general terms, the phrase "religious epiphany" is used when a person realizes their faith, or when they are convinced that an event or happening was really caused by a deity or being of their faith. In Hinduism, for example, epiphany might refer to Arjuna's realization that Krishna (serving as his charioteer in the "Bhagavad Gita") is indeed representing the Universe. The Hindu term for epiphany would be bodhodaya, from Sanskrit bodha "wisdom" and udaya "rising". In Buddhism, the term might refer to the Buddha obtaining enlightenment under the bodhi tree, finally realizing the nature of the universe, and thus attaining Nirvana. The Zen term kensho also describes this moment, referring to the feeling attendant on realizing the answer to a koan.

In Christianity, the Epiphany refers to a realization that Jesus Christ is the Son of God. Western churches generally celebrate the Visit of the Magi as the revelation of the Incarnation of the infant Christ, and commemorate the Feast of the Epiphany on January 6. Traditionally, Eastern churches, following the Julian rather than the Gregorian calendar, have celebrated Epiphany (or Theophany) in conjunction with Christ's baptism by John the Baptist and celebrated it on January 19; however, other Eastern churches have adopted the Western Calendar and celebrate it on January 6. Some Protestant churches often celebrate Epiphany as a season, extending from the last day of Christmas until either Ash Wednesday, or the Feast of the Presentation on February 2.

== See also ==
- Anagnorisis – Moment of critical discovery in literature
- Apophenia – Tendency to perceive connections between unrelated things
- Eureka effect – Suddenly understanding a problem or concept
- Hierophany – Manifestation of the sacred
- Kenshō – Seeing one's "true nature" as inherently empty of a personal self
- Lateral thinking – Manner of solving problems
- Peripeteia – Reversal of circumstances, turning point
- Phosphene – Visual illusion
- Revelation – Communication from a deity
- Samadhi – State of meditative consciousness
- Satori – Japanese Buddhist term for awakening
- Theophany – Appearance of a deity in an observable way
