= Linji Yixuan =

Founder of the Linji school of Chan Buddhism (died 866)

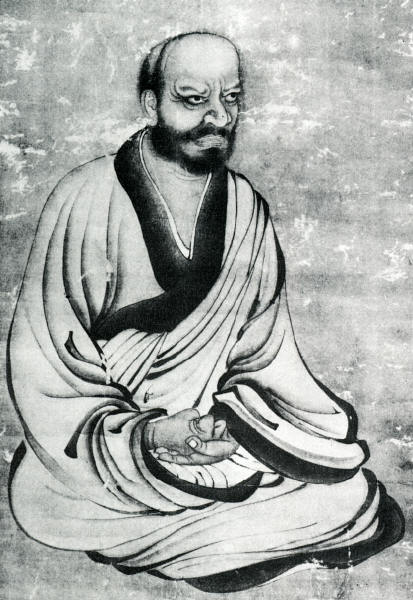
Japanese painting of Linji

Linji Yixuan (traditional Chinese: 臨濟義玄; simplified Chinese: 临济义玄; pinyin: Línjì Yìxuán; Wade–Giles: Lin-chi I-hsüan; Japanese: 臨済義玄 Rinzai Gigen; died 866 CE) was a Tang dynasty (618-907) Chinese monk and teacher of the Hongzhou school of Chinese Chan (Zen). Linji was the leading figure of Chan Buddhism in the Tang era, and the Recorded Sayings of Linji (Linji yulu), which contains his teachings, is seen as a major Chan (Zen) text which exemplifies the iconoclastic and antinomian spirit of Chan. He is also known by the posthumous title Huizhao Chanshi (慧照禪師, "Meditation Master of Illuminating Wisdom").

Linji was a student of Huangbo Xiyun and is also considered to be the founder of the influential Linji school of Chan. This school actually developed in the Song dynasty (960-1279) among descendants of Linji, who created various mythic stories about Linji in the process of founding their new school of Zen. Today he is seen as the founder of the various Linji regional traditions, including the Japanese Rinzai school, the contemporary Korean Seon schools (all which consider themselves to be of the "Imjae" line, i.e. Linji) and the Lâm Tế school of Vietnamese Zen.

== Biography ==
=== Sources ===
Information on Linji is based on the Linji yulu and other sources like the Zutang ji, Jingde chuan-denglu, Song gaoseng zhuan (Song-dynasty Biographies of eminent monks), and the Tiansheng guang-denglu (Tiansheng-era Extensive record of the transmission). However, the composition of these sources, like the Linji yulu, occurred over various stages of historical development, culminating in the Song dynasty version of the Linji yulu published by the Linji school. This text thus includes stories and passages attributed to Linji by later authors. As such, according to Albert Welter, "the life of the historical person Linji is shrouded in legend." Yanagida Seizan also writes "If we construct a chronology of the master’s life it must be a tentative one only, based for the most part upon traditional material rather than upon facts that can be substantiated with historical accuracy.

=== Life ===
According to the sources, Linji was born during the Yuanhe era (806–820) into a family named Xing (邢) living in Nanhua (南華), Cao (曹) Prefecture (modern Yanzhou 兖州 in Shandong Province). Little is known of his early life. According to the Guzunsu yulu (Recorded sayings of the ancient worthies), "After shaving his head and receiving the full precepts, he frequented the lecture halls; he mastered the vinaya and made a thorough study of the sutras and śāstras." Yanagida Seizan writes that his teachings indicate that Linji was knowledgeable in the Mahayana sutras and also "show the influence of works of the Huayan 華嚴 (Avataṃsaka) and Weishi 唯識(“Consciousness-only”; Yogācāra) schools." Seizan also mentions that he seems to have been expert in the teachings of Yogācāra, since the Zutang ji depicts Linji's first meeting with Dayu as being a discussion on the Treatise on the stages of Yogācāra practice (Yuqie lun 瑜伽論).

After this period of study however, Linji turned to meditative practice, as sermon 18 of the Record of Linji states "But later, when I realized that they were only remedies to help the world and displays of opinion, I threw them all away, and, searching for the Way, I practiced meditation." Linji then traveled to Jiangnan where he met Chan master Huangbo Xiyun (黃蘗希運), at some point between 836 and 841. He likely stayed with Huangbo at Mount Huangbo for about three years until he had a great enlightenment. According to sources like the Record of Linji, Linji questioned Huangbo three times about the central meaning of Buddhism and Huangbo struck him three times. Then Huangbo sent Linji to meet the reclusive monk Dàyú (大愚). After exchanging some words with this monk, Linji attained an awakening or (見性, jianxing). He then returned to Huangbo and told him what had occurred. Huangbo slapped Linji, saying “You lunatic, coming back here and pulling the tiger’s whiskers!” Then Linji responded with a loud shout. After this event, Linji stayed with Huangbo for some time, or he may have traveled to practice with Dayu for a time as well. The various sources differ on this issue.

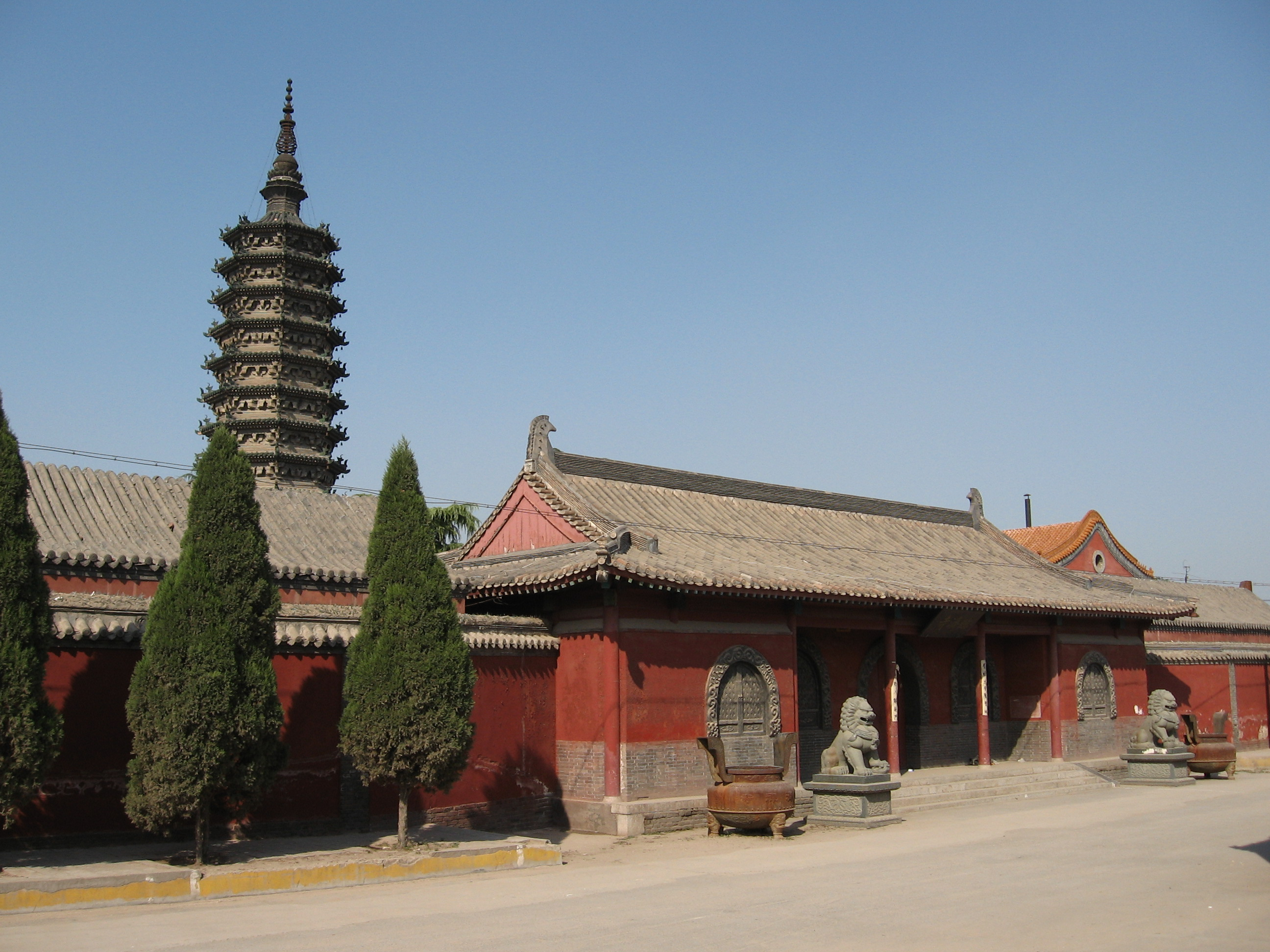
Linji temple

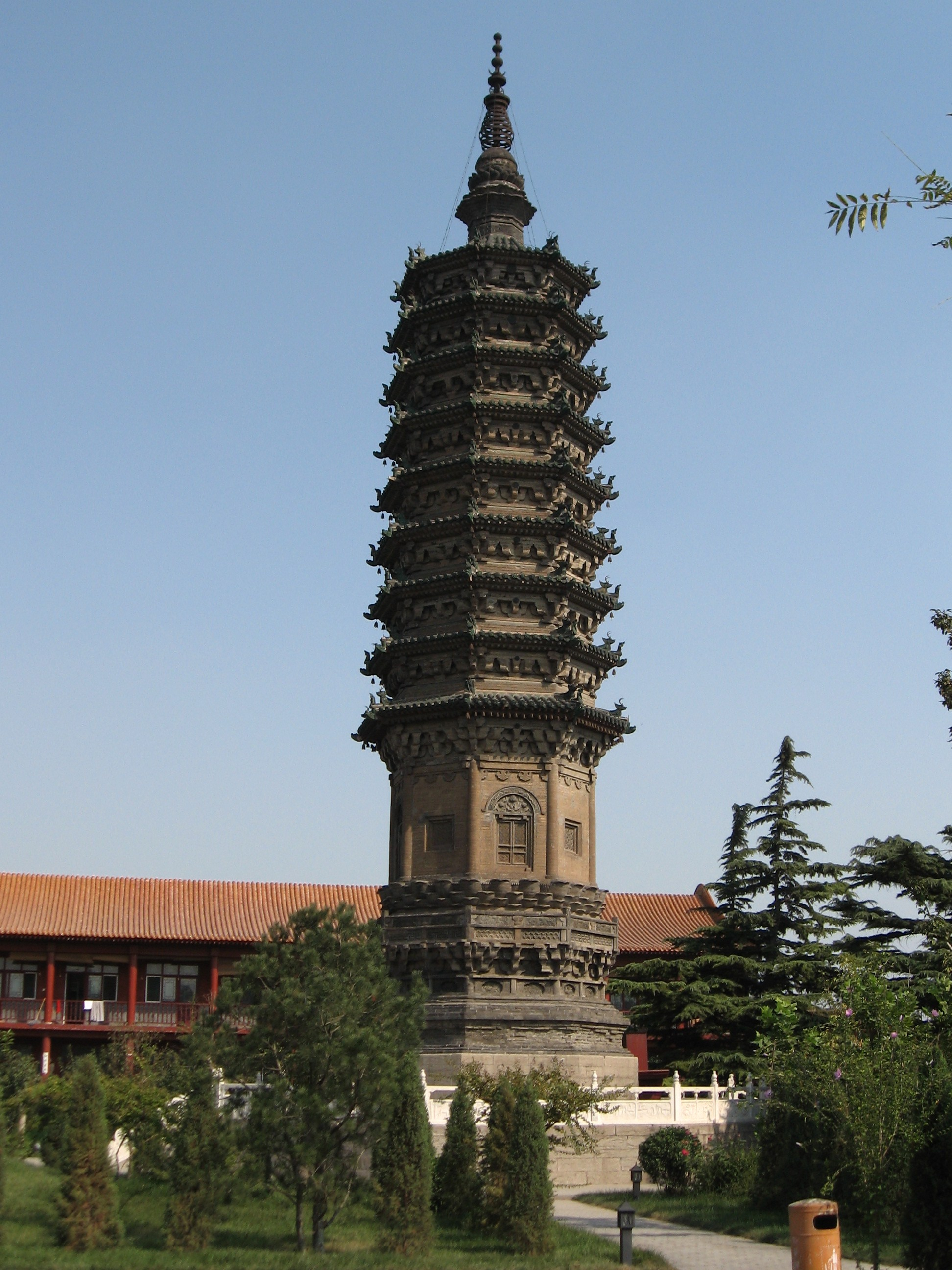
The Chengling pagoda at Linji Temple is believed to contain the remains of Linji.

In around 849 or 850 Linji, an older forty year old, left on a pilgrimage. Little is known of this pilgrimage, though the Chuandeng lu mentions that he visited Bodhidharma’s memorial tower in Henan. In about 851, Linji settled in Zhenzhou, Hebei where he led a small temple located southeast of the city of Zhenzhou. It was known as the Linji yuan (臨濟院, “Temple Overlooking the Ford”) since it was on the banks of the Hutuo River. It is the name of this temple which gave Linji his name. Linji's temple may have been supported by the Wang family patriarch Wang Yuankui 王元逵 (d. 855) or one of his sons.

Linji lived and taught in this temple for about ten years. Linji's students included Zhaozhou Congshen, Puhua, Sansheng Huiran, Baoshou Yanzhao, Xinghua Cunjiang, Mayu, Longya Judun, Dajue, and Xingshan Jianhong. In about 863 or 864, Linji left Linji temple to accept an invitation by Lord Jiang Shen, regional commissioner of Hezhong, who had his seat at Puzhou (蒲州). From Puzhou, Linji traveled to Weifu on the invitation from Grand Marshal and President of the Grand Imperial Secretariat, Lord He. At Weifu, he stayed at Jiangxi Chanyuan Temple (江西禪院), of Guanyin si (觀音寺). He stayed at this temple for a year, receiving visitors, until his death. The Linji Lu describes his death as follows:

Suddenly one day the master, although not ill, adjusted his robes, sat erect, and when his exchange with Sansheng [Sansheng Huiran] was finished, quietly passed away. It was on the tenth day of the first month in the eighth year of Xiantong [18 February 867] of the Tang dynasty.

=== Posthumous influence ===
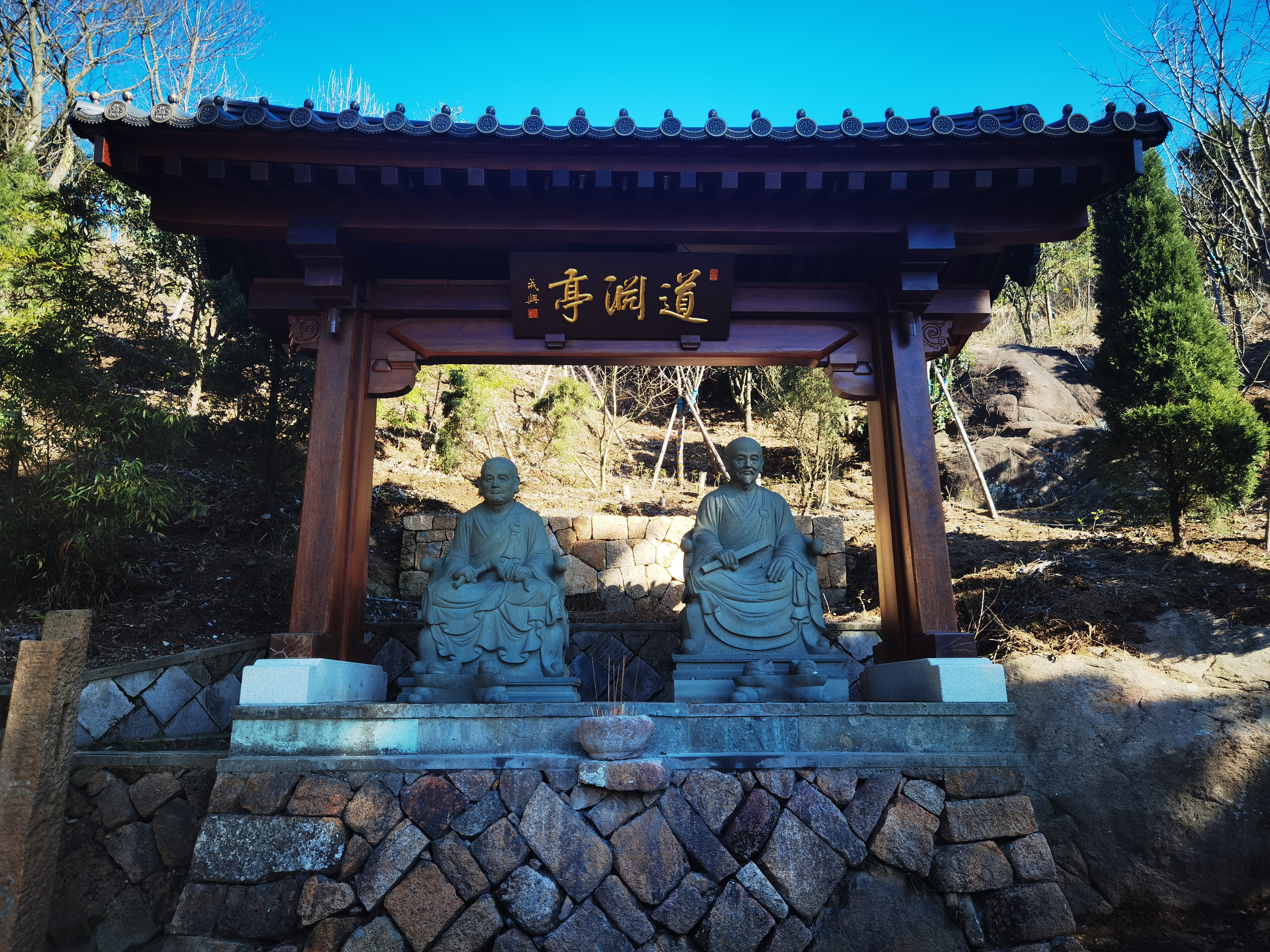
Pavilion in memory of the shared origin of Chinese Linji and Japanese Rinzai in Jingshan Temple

After Linji's death, his disciples then cremated him and built a memorial pagoda for the master's remains in the capital of Daming Prefecture. The Chinese emperor decreed that Linji was to receive the posthumous title "Huizhao Chanshi" (慧照禪師, "Meditation Master of Illuminating Wisdom").

According to Yanagida Seizan, "Linji died probably in his early or mid-fifties, and thus did not reach the advanced age of many of the illustrious masters of his time. Nor did he leave a large body of notable disciples to disseminate his style of Chan."

Of Linji's small body of disciples, only Xinghua Cunjiang's line of transmission survived. Very little is known of Cunjiang's heir Nanyuan Huiyong. The three succeeding figures from Nanyuan: Fengxue Yanzhao, Shoushan Shengnian, and Fenyang Shanzhao, all remained in the Yellow river area. According to Albert Welter, "While the inspiration for the Linji Chan faction was, of course Linji Yixuan, the real founder of the movement was, as noted previously, Shoushan Shengnian (926–993), a fourth-generation descendant."

Fenyang Shanzhao's heir, Shishuang Chuyuan, transmitted the Linji lineage to Southern China. Shishuang was instrumental in promoting and expanding the influence of the Linji school. Over time, this tradition became one of the largest and most influential schools of Chan in East Asia, with branches in Japan (Rinzai), Korea and Vietnam.

Linji's students compiled and passed on his teachings in various sources, the most famous of which is the Recorded Sayings of Linji (Linji yulu).

== The Record of Linji and other sources ==
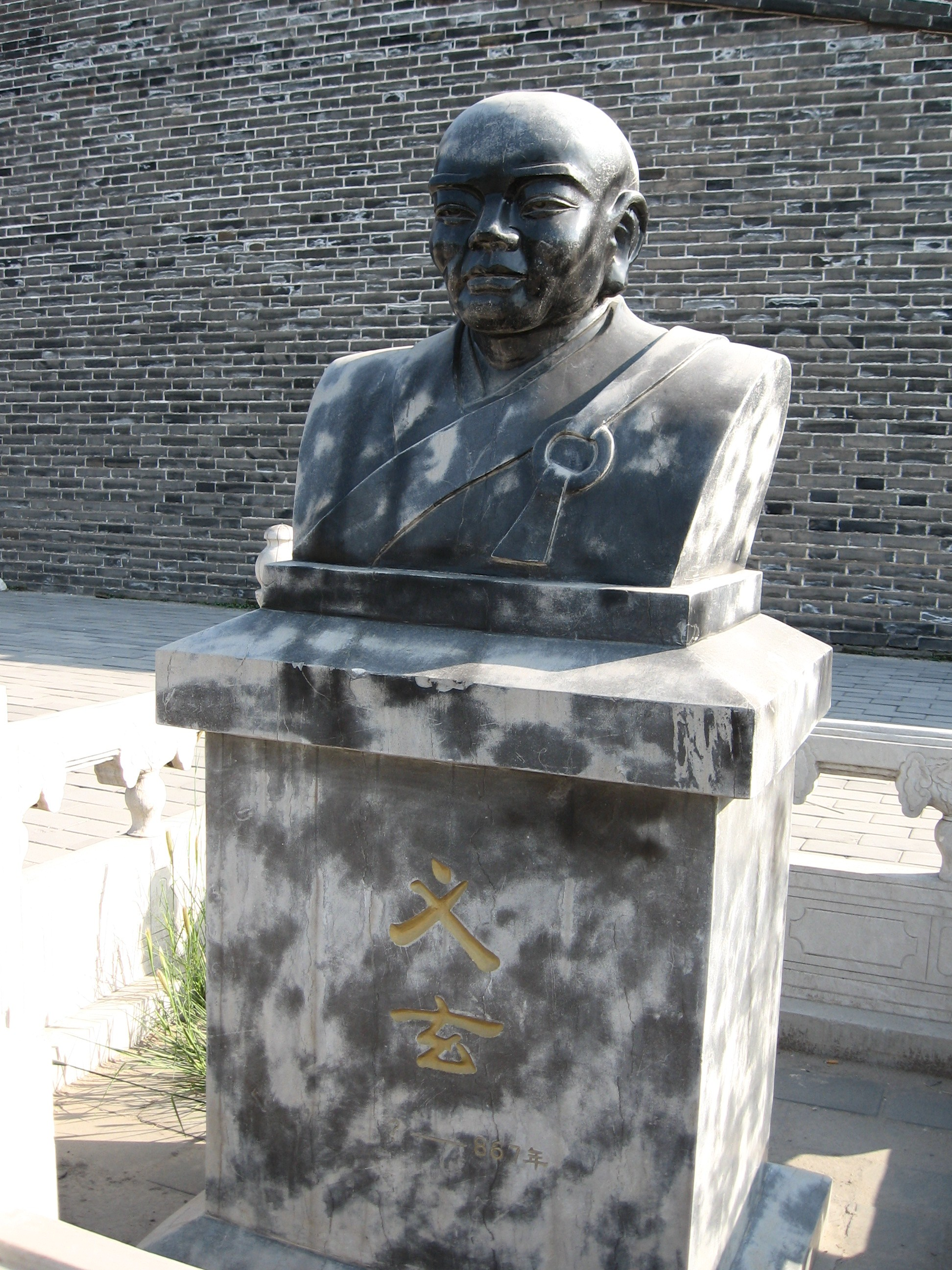
A statue of Linji Yixuan under the southern gate of Zhengding Hebei, China

The Linji yulu (臨濟語錄; Japanese: Rinzai-goroku, Recorded Sayings of Linji) or Línjìlù for short, is a collection of sayings and anecdotes attributed to Linji which is traditionally considered to be the main source of Linji's teachings. The full title is Zhenzhou linji huizhao chanshi yulu (鎭州臨濟慧照禪師語錄, Recorded Sayings of Chan Master Huizhao of Linji in Zhenzhou).

The standard edition of the Linji yulu (c. 1120) was not completed until two hundred fifty years after Linji's death (866). Thus parts of the text likely reflects the concerns of the Song dynasty Linji school rather than that of Linji in particular. The standard edition was first included within the massive Tiansheng guangdeng lu by the lay believer Li Zunxu (a student of Guyin Yuncong) in 1036 and it was independently printed in 1120 by Yuanjue Zongyan at Mount Gu in Fuzhou (present-day Fujian).

Yanagida Seizan writes that "we have no way of determining exactly what the earliest version of the Linji lu was like or when it was compiled." In spite of this, Yanagida Seizan still held that the main twenty two sermons in the Linji yulu "provide us with an account of the man and his teaching".

Furthermore, earlier passages from Linji's sermons can be found in texts compiled before the 12th century, such as the Zutang ji, the Zongjing lu, the Jingde Chuan-deng lu and the Tiansheng guang-denglu (Tiansheng-era Extensive record of the transmission). These passages contain minor differences with the parallel passages from Linji's sermons found in the Linji yulu according to Yanagida.

Albert Welter also notes that the earliest fragments of Linji's teachings are found in the Zutang ji, which was compiled in 952. However, regarding the contents of the Linji lu, he writes:

Ultimately, the story of the Linji lu is the story of a movement that found its voice and identity through the image and alleged teachings of Linji. What these teachings represent are not the words of one man, which are in any case irretrievable, but the combined aspirations of the movement as a whole, projected onto the persona of Linji as founder. Linji wrote nothing himself. Our knowledge of his teachings allegedly depends on notes taken by students of his sermons, lectures, dialogues, and other interactions. The names of those who originally kept such notebooks are unknown to us. Eventually, fragments of Linji's teachings were included in Chan transmission records.

The Linji yulu contains stories of Linji's interactions with teachers, contemporaries, and students. The recorded lectures are a mixture of the conventional and the iconoclastic; those who resented the iconoclastic nature of Linji discourse saw him as "one of the most infamous Chinese Chan masters who censored traditional Buddhist practices and doctrines." Despite the iconoclasm, however, the Linji yulu reflects a thorough knowledge of the sūtras. Linji's style of teaching, as recorded in that text, exemplifies Chán development in the Hongzhou school (洪州宗) of Mazu and his successors, such as Huangbo, Linji's master.

== Teachings ==
=== Iconoclasm ===
The Linju lu presents Linji as an iconoclastic teacher who used shocking language in vernacular Chinese to disrupt the tendency of his listeners to grasp at concepts such as buddhas, patriarchs, bodhisattvas, stages of practice and levels of attainment. He famously said, "If you meet a buddha, kill the buddha." While Linji's language may sound extreme, it reflects an attitude which considers grasping at buddhas, bodhi, nirvana, Dharma, and other such related Buddhist concepts, as a kind of delusion. As Burton Watson observes:

The message of Lin-chi's sermons, reiterated with almost wearisome persistence, is that his followers are allowing all this talk of goals and striving, of buddhas and patriarchs, to cloud their outlook and to block the path of understanding. All such words and concepts are external and extraneous postulations, attachment to which is just as much a delusion and impediment as attachment to any crasser objective, such as sensual gratification or material gain. Again and again he exhorts them to put aside all such external concerns and to turn their gaze within, where the Buddha-nature inherent in all beings is to be found.

Such sentiments can already be seen in earlier Chan sources. For example, Shenhui points out that while lust for wealth and sex is "gross falsity", activating one's intention to grasp bodhi, nirvana, emptiness, purity, and concentration is "subtle falsity". Likewise, Huangbo said that to conceive of a buddha is to be obstructed by that buddha, while the Bloodstream Sermon criticized the worshipping of buddhas as holding onto appearances.

=== Non-dependency ===
According to Linji, Zen students fail to make spiritual progress because they lack faith in themselves and are thereby "twisted and turned" by whatever environment they encounter. They cling to phrases and are obstructed by words like "common mortal" and "sage", and for Linji, this is to still be dependent on something. Rather than rely on buddhas, bodhisattvas, and the Chan patriarchs, Linji taught his listeners that they should be non-dependent persons of the Way:

You listening to the Dharma, if you are men of the Way who depend on nothing, then you are the mother of the buddhas. Therefore the buddhas are born from the realm that leans on nothing. If you can waken to this leaning on nothing, then there will be no Buddha to get hold of. If you can see things in this way, this is a true and proper understanding.

=== True person ===
Although we may be "twisted and turned" by dependencies and externals, Linji taught that the true person, the one who "has the ability to speak dharma and listen to it", is a "solitary brightness" (or the one "shining alone", 孤明; gū míng) who is not swayed by various situations or environments:

Followers of the Way, this lone brightness before my eyes now, this person plainly listening to me—this person is unimpeded at any point but penetrates the ten directions, free to do as he pleases in the threefold world. No matter what environment he may encounter, with its peculiarities and differences, he cannot be swayed or pulled awry. (Note: Japanese commentators associate solitary brightness with "mind", "original nature", "natural face", "original source of all the buddhas", "the ārya knowledge of awakening on one's own", "the dharma substance of the mind ground", and "The thing 'you let loose to fill up the dharmadhātu and roll up so that it is not enough to stand up a single strand of hair'".)

Similarly, Linji described the mind as a "single bright essence" (or "one pure radiance", 一精明) which is formless and penetrates all directions. According to Linji, because this mind is formless, it is everywhere emancipated, and thus there was no need to go "rushing around everywhere looking for something". Instead, Linji advised his listeners to stop and take a good look at themselves.

Another way in which Linji referred to the true person was "the true man with no rank" (無位真人; wúwèi zhēnrén). According to Welter, all early sources agree that the notion of "the true man with no-rank" (which can also mean "a sage without any location") was a major teaching of Linji. In what is perhaps the earliest source of this teaching, the Zutang ji, it is presented as follows:

On one occasion, the Master (Linji) addressed the assembly: "I, a mountain monk, tell you clearly—within the body-field of the five skandhas there is a true man with no-rank, always present, not even a hair's breadth away. Why don't you recognize him?"

Then, a monk asked: "What is this true man with no rank?"

The Master struck him, and said: "The true man with no-rank—what an impure thing."

Other sources contain similar statements. In the Chuandenglu, for example, Linji says, "within your lump of red flesh there is a true man with no rank, constantly entering and exiting the openings of your face." When a monk asks who the true man is, Linji responds by saying, "The true man with no rank—what a dried lump of shit!" (Note: Japanese commentators on the Linji lu associate the lump of red flesh, or the "red-meatball", with the first of the four types of mind in Zongmi's Chan Prolegomenon; and the true man, or true person, with Zongmi's "real mind"; Regarding the four types of mind, Zongmi says: "The first is helituoye. This means the mind that is a lump of flesh. This is the mind in each of the five viscera in the body. [...] The second is the pondering-of-objective-supports mind. This is the eight consciousnesses [vijñāna], because all [eight] are capable of pondering as objective supports their own sense objects. [...] The third is zhiduoye [citta]. This means the mind that accumulates and produces, because only the eighth consciousness accumulates [karmic] seeds and produces the [seven] active [consciousnesses]. [...] The fourth is ganlituoye. This means real mind or true mind. This is the true mind.")

=== Faith ===
Linji criticized relying on methods and practices in order to realize this true person. He said that to engage in religious practice was to generate karma keeping one bound to the realm of birth and death, while "the real person", "this person who is right now listening to the Dharma", is without any adornments or practices. Instead of reliance on practices to see our innate nature, Linji taught that we should simply have faith (信; xìn) in it: "Just have faith in this thing that is operating in you right now. Outside of it, nothing else exists." (Note: Compare with Foyan: "I always tell you that what is inherent in you is presently active and presently functioning, and need not be sought after, need not be put in order, need not be practiced or proven. All that is required is to trust it once and for all. This saves a lot of energy.")

According to Buswell, faith for Linji was not blind acceptance, but an inherent faculty emanating constantly from the enlightened nature, and was thus equivalent to the "innate functioning" of the mind-essence. Buswell also notes the striking difference between Linji's teachings, in which faith plays a prominent role, and the teachings of the later Linji school master Dahui, who valued doubt over faith. (Note: Linji speaks of doubt negatively. For example: "A moment when your mind is in doubt is delusion", and "If you have a moment of doubt, delusion enters your mind." See also the famous Xinxin Ming (Faith-Mind Inscription): "Small views of foxy doubts / Are too hasty or too late / Attach to them, the measure will be lost / Certain to enter on a deviant path / Letting go of them, it goes naturally.")

=== Nothing to do ===
In addition to faith, Linji also emphasized non-seeking and wú shì (無事), a term often translated as "nothing-to-do", but which also has the meaning of no affairs, no concerns, no matters, and no business. He says:

Followers of the Way, as I look at it, we're no different from Shakyamuni. In all our various activities each day, is there anything we lack? The wonderful light of the six faculties has never for a moment ceased to shine. If you could just look at it this way, then you'd be the kind of person who has nothing to do for the rest of his life.

Accordingly, Linji taught that there was no need to make any special effort. Instead, we have simply to be ordinary: "Followers of the Way, as to buddhadharma, no effort is necessary. You have only to be ordinary, with nothing to do—defecating, urinating, wearing clothes, eating food, and lying down when tired." As Jinhua Jia points out, this recognition of the fundamental value of the human being echoes the teachings of Mazu Daoyi, for whom everyday ordinary activities were the function of buddha-nature.

Linji also connects non-doing with "turning one's light around" (返照; fǎn zhào), a term that occurs throughout various Chan texts, such as Zongmi's Sub-commentary to the Sutra of Perfect Enlightenment (where it refers to recognizing one's original enlightenment). According to Linji, when we stop our seeking and turn our own light in upon ourselves, we will on that very instant have nothing to do. (Note: Compare with the Xinxin Ming: In self-illumination, vast and clear, The mind's power exerts itself no more.)

However, "turning one's light around" does not necessarily imply anything like staring at the mind or concentrating within. Linji quotes Shenhui's well-known criticism of such things as arresting the mind, staring at silence, summoning the mind to focus it on externals, controlling the mind to make it clear within, and concentrating the mind to enter into meditation. Moreover, Linji says that looking for something within is just as wrong as seeking externally, since there is nothing within that can be grasped: "Outside the mind there is no Dharma, and even inside the mind it can't be grasped. So what is there to seek for?" (Note: Compare with the following, attributed to Baozhi: "Inward looking, outward looking, all are bad".)

== Lineage ==
	Chinese characters and Wade-Giles Romanization	Life dates	Việt name	Japanese name and Romaji	Korean Hangeul and South Korean Revised Romanization
28 / 1	達磨 / Damo	?	達磨 / Đạtma	だるま / Daruma	달마 / Dalma
29 / 2	慧可 / Shenguang Huìke	487–593	Huệ Khả	Eka	혜가 / Hyega
30 / 3	僧璨 / Jianzhi Sengcan	?–606	Tăng Xán	Sōsan	승찬 / Seungchan
31 / 4	道信 / Dongshan Daoxin	580–651	Đạo Tín	Dōshin	도신 / Doshim
32 / 5	弘忍 / Huangmei Hongren	601/602–674/5	Hoằng Nhẫn	Kōnin	홍인 / Hongihn
33 / 6	慧能 / Caoxi Huineng	638–713	Huệ Năng	Enō	혜능 / Hyeneung
34 / 7	南嶽懷讓 / Nanyue Huairang	677–744	Nam Nhạc Hoài Nhượng	Nangaku Ejō	남악회양 / Namak Hweyang
35 / 8	馬祖道一 / Mazu Daoyi	709–788	Mã Tổ Đạo Nhất	Baso Dōitsu	마조도일 / Majo Toil
36 / 9	百丈懷海 / Baizhang Huaihai	720?/749?–814	Bách Trượng Hoài Hải	Hyakujō Ekai	백장회해 / Paekchang Hwehae
37 / 10	黃蘗希運 / Huangbo Xiyun	?–850	Hoàng Bá Hy Vận	Ōbaku Kiun	황벽희운 / Hwangbyeok Heuiun
38 / 11	臨濟義玄 / Linji Yixuan	?–866/867	Lâm Tế Nghĩa Huyền	Rinzai Gigen	임제의현 / Imje Euihyeon

== See also ==
- Buddhism in China
- Dharma Drum Retreat Center – Chán Buddhism retreat center
- List of Rinzai Buddhists

== Sources ==
- Broughton, Jeffrey; Watanabe, Elise Yoko (2013), The Record of Linji: A New Translation of the Linjilu in the Light of Ten Japanese Zen Commentaries, New York: Oxford Academic, ISBN 978-0199936434
- McRae, John (2003), Seeing Through Zen. Encounter, Transformation, and Genealogy in Chinese Chan Buddhism, The University Press Group Ltd, ISBN 978-0-520-23798-8
- Sasaki, Ruth Fuller (2009), Kirchner, Thomas Yuho (ed.), The Record of Linji, Honolulu: University of Hawaii Press, ISBN 978-0824833190
- Watson, Burton (1999). The Zen Teachings of Master Lin-chi. Columbia University Press.
- Welter, Albert (n.d.), The Textual History of the Linji lu (Record of Linji): The Earliest Recorded Fragments
- Welter, Albert (2008), The Linji Lu and the Creation of Chan Orthodoxy: The Development of Chan's Records of Sayings Literature, Oxford University Press, ISBN 9780195329575

Buddhist titles
Preceded by Huangbo Xiyun	Linji Chan/Rinzai Zen patriarch	Succeeded by Xinghua Cunjiang
