= Original face =

Concept in Zen Buddhism

The original face is a term in Zen Buddhism, pointing to one's real essence or Buddha-nature, one's 'real face'. (Note: Compare Original face, and Douglas Harding.)

== Origins ==
The phrase "original face" originates in Huangbo's Chuanhsin fayao (857) and the Hui-sin edition (967) of the Platform Sutra:

When you're not thinking of anything good and anything bad, at that moment, what is your original face?

This question appears in case 23 of the Mumonkan:

CASE 23. ENO'S GOOD AND EVIL

Eno, the sixth patriarch, was pursued by Monk Emyo up to Daiyurei. The patriarch, seeing Emyo coming, laid the robe and the bowl on a rock, and said to him, "This robe represents the faith. Is it to be fought for by force? You may take them now." Emyo went to move the bowl and the robe and yet they were as heavy as mountains. He could not move them. Hesitating and trembling, Emyo asked the patriarch, "I come for the teaching, not for the robe. Please enlighten me!" The patriarch said, "What is primordially Emyo (i.e., your true self), if you do not think this is good nor do you think this is evil?" At that moment Emyo was greatly awakened. His whole body was covered with sweat. Emyo cried, bowed, and said, "Is there or is there not any other (deep) significance (in Zen) than your secret words and teachings a minute ago?" The patriarch answered, "What I have told you is no secret at all. Once you have realized your own true self, the depth (in Zen) rather belongs to you!" Emyo said, "When I was at Obai with the other monks, I never realized what my true self was. Now you have dispersed the clouds of my ignorance to realize it, just like a man capable of discerning warm and cold by tasting water. From now on you are my teacher!" The patriarch said, "We both have Obai for our teacher. Guard your own self!"

Mumon's Comments: We should say that the sixth patriarch was in an emergency. This revelation of his, however, resembles the deed of an overly protective grandmother, who peeled a fresh lichi (a dessert fruit), removed its stone and put it to her grandchild's mouth ready for him to swallow.

You describe it in vain, you picture it to no avail,
Praising it is useless, cease to worry about it at all.
It is your true self, it has nowhere to hide,

Even if the universe is annihilated, it is not destroyed.

This koan is transformed in the question

What did your face look like before your parents were born?

== Interpretation ==
According to Victor Hori, the "original face" points to "the nonduality of subject and object":

[T]he phrase "father and mother" alludes to duality. This is obvious to someone versed in the Chinese tradition, where so much philosophical thought is presented in the imagery of paired opposites. The phrase "your original face" alludes to the original nonduality.

Comparable statements are: "Look at the flower and the flower also looks"; "Guest and host interchange".

According to Victor Hori, it is not "pure consciousness", as it is often understood in western thinking, reached by "cleaning the doors of perception": (Note: "If the doors of perception were cleansed every thing would appear to man as it is, infinite. For man has closed himself up, till he sees all things thru' narrow chinks of his cavern." William Blake)

[A] pure consciousness without concepts, if there could be such a thing, would be a booming, buzzing confusion, a sensory field of flashes of light, unidentifiable sounds, ambiguous shapes, color patches without significance. This is not the consciousness of the enlightened Zen master.

== Comments ==
Zen masters have commented on the original face:

"Sweep away thoughts!" means one must do zazen. Once thoughts are quieted, the Original Face appears. Thoughts can be compared to clouds. When clouds vanish, the moon appears. The moon of suchness is the Original Face. Thoughts are also like the fogging of a mirror. When you wipe away all condensation, a mirror reflects clearly. Quiet your thoughts and behold your Original Face before you were born!

— Daito

Cease practice based
On intellectual understanding,
Pursuing words and
Following after speech.
Learn the backward
Step that turns
Your light inward
To illuminate within.
Body and mind of themselves
Will drop away
And your original face will be manifest.

— Dogen

You cannot describe it or draw it,
You cannot praise it enough or perceive it.
No place can be found in which
To put the Original Face;
It will not disappear even
When the universe is destroyed.

— Mumon

"What's called one's 'original face' is also none other than the Unborn Buddha Mind. What you have from your parents innately is the Unborn Buddha Mind alone—there's nothing else you've got innately. This is an expression left behind by a master of old in his attempt to make people realize the fact that the Unborn Buddha Mind is none other than one's original face. Even what we call 'father and mother' are names of traces that have already arisen. The man who has conclusively realized the Buddha Mind abides at the source of father and mother, and that's why we speak of [that which exists] 'before father and mother were born.' This 'before they were born' is none other than the Unborn; so the Buddha Mind is the same as your original face. . . ."

— Bankei

== Artistic impressions ==
=== Philip Whalen ===
The American poet Philip Whalen has written a poem, Metaphysical Insomnia Jazz Mumonkan xxix, inspired by the Original Face-koan:

Of

Course I could go to sleep right here
With all the lights on & the radio going

(April is behind the refrigerator)

Far from the wicked city
Far from the virtuous town
I met my fragile Kitty
In her greeny silken gown

fairly near the summit of Nanga Parbat & back again, the wind
flapping the prayer-flags

"IT IS THE WIND MOVING."
"IT IS THE FLAG MOVING."

Hypnotized by the windshield swipes, Mr. Harold Wood:
"Back & forth; back & forth."

We walked beside the moony lake
Eating dried apricots
Lemons bananas & bright wedding cake
& benefits forgot

"IT IS THE MIND MOVING."

& now I'm in my bed alone

Wide awake as any stone (Note: See for original interpunctuation, which has been removed here, due to Wikipedia mark-up)

Keith Kumasen has commented on this poem.

=== Stuart Davis ===
The American Buddhist musician Stuart Davis has recorded a song called "Original Face". The chorus goes:

There's a light bulb in everyone

Bright enough to swallow the sun,
Every mask will be erased,

There is just the original face.

== See also ==
- The "Five Ranks" of Tozan
- "Who is the master who sees and hears?"

== Sources ==
- Falk, Jane (2009), Finger Pointing at the Moon. Zen and the Poetry of Philip Whalen. In: John Whalen-Bridge (2009), "The Emergence of Buddhist American Literature", SUNY Press
- Hori, Victor Sogen (2000), Koan and Kensho in the Rinzai Zen Curriculum. In: Steven Heine and Dale S. Wright (eds)(2000): "The Koan. Texts and Contexts in Zen Buddhism, Oxford: Oxford University Press
- Red Pine (2008), The Platform Sutra: The Zen Teaching of Hui-neng, Counterpoint Press
- Shimomissé, Eiichi (1998), THE GATELESS GATE, archived from the original on 2012-08-25
