= Gangchon Recreation Area =

The Gangchon Recreation Area (Korean: 강촌유원지) is a South Korean recreational area between Chuncheon-si and Gapyeong-gun. It is in Gangchon-ri, Namsan-myeon, Chuncheon-si, Gangwon.

== Facilities ==
The Gangchon Recreation Area offers accommodations for visitors, including a camping village and a youth hostel. It has amusement activities such as a cycle lane, a survival game field and a bungee jumping field. The recreation area is located near popular tourist attractions, including Elysian Gangchon, Gugok Falls, Samaksan Mountain, Bonghwasan Mountain, Gangchon Theme Land, Geombongsan Mountain and Moonbae village.

Hiking trails include paths to Gugok Falls, Deungseon Falls, Samaksan and a long walking road along the Bukhangang in the Gangchon Recreation Area. Many people enjoy swimming, fishing, cycling and hiking in the area.

About 950,000 people visit Gangchon each year. It is a travel destination for students, because of its proximity to Seoul. The peak season is from spring to autumn.

== Natural environment ==
Gangchon is a tributary area formed alongside the Bukhangang (북한강). It flows between the Samaksan (삼악산) and the Geombongsan (검봉산). The Gangchon Recreation area is located on the confluence of the Gangchon River and the Bukhangang River. Gangchon is located on the mid-latitude of Korean territory and experiences a continental climate.

== Nearby Attractions ==
- Gugok Falls: Designated as a tourist attraction of Chuncheon-si on Feb. 13th, 1981. It has an area of 2,423 km^{2}.
- Rail bike: The bike trail follows the Gyeongchun Line railway.
- Elysian Gangchon Resort: Ski resort, golf course and membership resort. It is a large-scale replica of recreational facilities in Namsan-myeon, Chuncheon-si, Gangwon-do, Korea.
- Gangchon theme land: water leisure sports, four-wheeled bike, survival game and bungee jumping.
- Suspension bridge(출렁다리): This bridge was built in the 1980s.
- Samaksan(삼악산): The mountain at Seo-myeon, Chuncheon-si, Gangwon-do and Sindong-myeon, Chuncheon-si, Gangwon-do is called the ‘Samaksan’; because, it has three of the highest peaks.

== Roads and transportation ==
- National highway: Seoul – No. 46 route – Cheongpyeong – Gapyeong – Gangchon recreational area
- Expressway: Seoul–Chuncheon expressway – Gangchon I.C – Gangchon recreational area
- Train: Gyeongchun Line – Sangbong station – Gangchon station – Gangchon recreational area
- Bus: Intra-city bus – 3, 5, 50, 50-1, 53-1, 56, 85
