= Bonghwasan =

Bonghwasan may refer to several places in South Korea:

- Bonghwasan (Namsan-myeon, Chuncheon), a mountain in Chuncheon, Gangwon Province
- Bonghwasan (North Jeolla), a mountain in North Jeolla Province
- Bonghwasan Mountain, in Jungnang District, Seoul
- Bonghwasan station, a railway station in Jungnang District, Seoul

== See also ==
- Ponghwasan
