= Yongseong =

Korean Zen Buddhist (1864–1940)

Yongseong Jinjong / 용성 진종 / 龍城 震鍾
- Title: Seon master

Personal life
- Born: Baek Sanggyu; 1864 Namwon, Jeolla-do, Korea
- Died: 1940 (aged 75–76)

Religious life
- Religion: Buddhism
- Denomination: Ganhwa Seon

Baek Yongseong Jinjong (Korean: 용성 진종; Hanja: 龍城 震鍾, 1864–1940) was a Korean Buddhist master who helped propagate Buddhism in Korea. Primarily grounded in the Seon tradition, he also set about teaching others of Pure Land Buddhism and undertook massive studies and translation efforts of the Buddhist Tripitaka. He was one of thirty-three national representatives present at the March 1 Movement of 1919, the representative of the Korean Buddhist community.

== Biography ==
Yongseong was born Baek Sanggyu in Namwon, Jeolla-do, Korea on May 8 of the Lunar calendar in 1864. As a boy he was very quiet and was educated from a young age, writing his first classical Chinese lyric poem by age nine. He entered his first monastery in 1877 at Deokmil-am, but was withdrawn by his parents not long after entering. In 1879, at age fifteen, he was ordained a sunim by the Venerable Hwanwol at Haeinsa in Hapcheon in South Gyeongsang and was given the ordination name Jinjong. He then traveled to see Venerable Suwol, who instructed Yongseong on the practice of dharani. Not long after, it is said that he had an "awakening experience" following six days of Seon meditation at Bogwangsa in Yangju. Not satisfied with his own awakening, he began his "investigation" of the MU koan under Seon master Muyung.

In 1884, at age twenty, Yongseong received the Vinaya and Bodhisattva Precepts under the Vinaya master Seongok at Tongdosa, becoming a fully ordained sunim. Yongseong attained enlightenment during this period at Songgwangsa. He spent the coming years practicing Seon meditation and studying the Korean Tripitaka at monasteries and temples throughout Korea, engaging many masters in Dharma combat. Beginning in 1903 he began leading discussions on Seon and Pure Land Buddhism with various students, and also set about building meditation halls for temples and repaired the Tripitaka woodblocks housed at Haeinsa. From 1907 to 1908 he traveled through parts of China, where he visited various temples and masters. According to the Jogye Order of Korean Buddhism's website, "To a Chinese monk who arrogantly praised the superiority of Chinese Buddhism and disparaged Korean Buddhism, he replied, 'Is the Sun and the Moon in the sky your country's alone? Buddhist dharma is a public truth of the world, so how can the public truth of the world be limited to China?' In this way, he defended the legitimacy of Korean Buddhism."

In 1910 he became Master of Chilburam Meditation Hall on Jirisan mountain, and his congregation asked him to critique others religions from a Buddhist standpoint. This resulted in his writing of a treatise known as Gwiwon Jeongjong, a work which focused primarily on the flaws of Christianity. In 1911 he left for Seoul, where he found himself dismayed by the situation of Korean Buddhism when contrasted with other religions. So he began teaching Buddhism to others while there, and established Daegaksa and other temples while there. He also managed a mining company to help fund some of his Buddhist missionary work. In 1919 he became involved in the Korean Independence Movement, and was named one of thirty-three national representatives for the March 1 Movement—the designated representative of the Buddhist community. He was arrested by the Japanese during this event and detained until 1921. Following his release, Yongseong doubled his efforts to propagate Buddhism in Korea, and in 1925 he established the "Supreme Enlightenment Foundation"—an organization which sought to establish Buddhist educational movements. He spent the remainder of his life spreading Buddhism, and died in 1940 at age 76.

== See also ==
- Buddhism in Korea
