= Jang Deog-cheon =

South Korean politician (born 1965)

- 장덕천
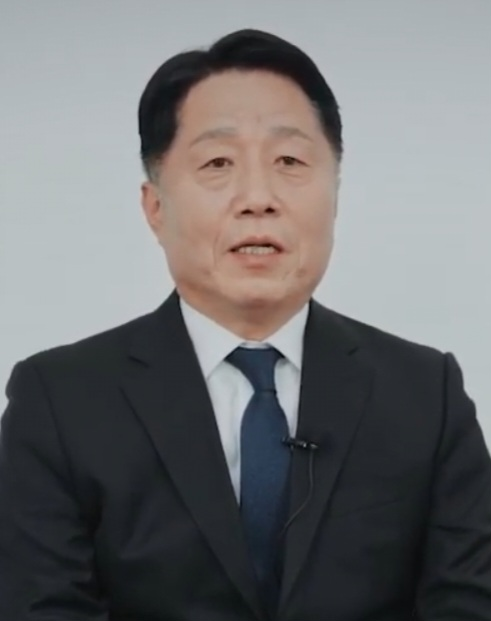

Mayor of Bucheon
- In office 1 July 2018 – 30 June 2022
- Preceded by: Kim Man-soo
- Succeeded by: Cho Yong-ik

Personal details
- Born: 28 November 1965 (age 60) Namwon, South Korea
- Party: Democratic
- Education: Seoul National University

Jang Deog-cheon (Korean: 장덕천; Hanja: 張德天; born 28 November 1965) is a South Korean lawyer and politician serving as Mayor of Bucheon in Gyeonggi Province from 2018.

== Lawyer ==
Jang was previously a legal advisor to the city from 2011 to 2015, Gyeonggi Province from 2017 to 2018 and Bucheon branch of Federation of Korean Trade Unions. He was also a lawyer at Bucheon office of Korea Legal Aid Corporation from 2016 to 2018 and a member of Incheon Regional National Labor Relations Commission from 2014 to 2015.

In 2015 Jang filed the first case against the Ministry of Education to the Constitutional Court of Korea for later-impeached president Park Geun-hye's state-issued history textbook on behalf of his 10-years-old son and his spouse for violating their right to choose textbooks and breaking political impartiality of education. In May 2017 President Moon Jae-in scrapped that policy on his third day in office. In 2018 the Court dismissed the case as the policy does not exist anymore.

== Political career ==
In the 2016 general election, Jang applied to be party's candidate for now-Bucheon B constituency but lost to Sul Hoon.

He worked at Moon Jae-in's second presidential campaign in 2017 as his special advisor on law and human rights. From 2018 he has served as a legal advisor to Roh Moo-hyun Foundation.

In the 2018 local election, Jang earned party's nomination defeating 8 candidates who mostly represented Bucheon at City council or Gyeonggi assembly and later joined his campaign.

In March 2020, Jang criticised Gyeonggi Provincial Governor Lee Jae-myung's policy to give every citizens in the Province 100,000KRW (roughly US$90) as part of Province's own Coronavirus relief fund that the budget for this policy should be better off with giving 4,000,000KRW to small business owners in Province who are severely affected by the pandemic. He later rescinded statements after the Governor announced Bucheon's citizens may not receive this fund.

== Education ==
Jang holds a bachelor's degree in politics from Seoul National University.

== Electoral history ==
Election	Year	Position	Party affiliation	Votes	Percentage of votes	Results
7th local elections	2018	Mayor of Bucheon	Democratic Party	258,028	66.1%	Won
