= Bonghwasan (North Jeolla) =

Mountain in South Korea

Highest point
- Elevation: 786–920 m (2,579–3,018 ft)
- Coordinates: 35°32′50″N 127°34′44″E

Geography
- Location: Beonam-myeon, Jangsu County, North Jeolla Special Self-Governing Province; also extending into Ayeong-myeon, Namwon, and Baekjeon-myeon, Hamyang County, South Gyeongsang Province, South Korea

Korean name
- Hangul: 봉화산
- Hanja: 峰火山
- RR: Bonghwasan
- MR: Ponghwasan

Bonghwasan (Korean: 봉화산; Hanja: 峰火山; lit. 'Beacon Fire Mountain') is a mountain located in Jeollabuk-do, South Korea. It lies at the midpoint of the southern section of the Baekdudaegan mountain range, between Deogyusan and Jirisan. The mountain straddles the borders of Beonam-myeon in Jangsu County, Ayeong-myeon in Namwon City, and Baekjeon-myeon in Hamyang County, Gyeongsangnam-do. It was named after the historic beacon towers on its summit, which likely date back to the Unified Silla period, and were used for long-distance military communication.

Geographically, Bonghwasan forms a natural ridge dividing multiple administrative regions and is bordered by several notable mountain ranges. Its slopes are rich in wildflowers and mountain vegetation. The mountain is renowned for its vibrant azalea blooms each spring, celebrated annually in the Bonghwasan Azalea Festival, which features traditional rituals, scenic flower tunnels, and historical sites near the mountain dating back to Korea's Three Kingdoms period.

== Name ==
Bonghwasan, meaning "Beacon Fire Mountain" is named after the historical beacon towers (봉화대) that once stood on its summit and were used to send signal fires across long distances. In the past, the mountain was sometimes mistaken for nearby Jangansan and referred to as “Jangansan of Jangsu-gun.” However, the discovery of ancient signal fire remains led to the mountain being formally recognized as Bonghwasan.

== Geography ==
Bonghwasan is a mountain that stretches along a ridge marking the border between several regions in southern Korea. It lies between Nodan-ri and Donghwa-ri in Beonam-myeon, Jangsu County (Jeollabuk-do), forms the northern edge of Ayeong-myeon in Namwon City, and extends into Baekjeon-myeon in Hamyang County, Gyeongsangnam-do. To the north, Bonghwasan is bordered by the Wolgyeongsan and Baekunsan mountain ranges, and separated from Jangsu-eup by the small Ssarijae Pass, where the mountain's lower peak marks a regional border. To the south lie the Maebong and Mosan ranges. The mountain is notable for the remains of ancient beacon towers, used to send signal fires across long distances. It was reported that these towers likely date back to the Unified Silla period (7th–10th century) and were part of a military communication network. Bonghwasan is also known for its vibrant azalea colonies in spring and its reeds in autumn. Across its slopes, visitors can find a rich variety of wildflowers and mountain vegetables that thrive throughout the year.

== Culture ==
=== Bonghwasan Rhododendron Festival ===
Bonghwasan Mountain hosts an annual Azalea Festival from late April to mid-May. The festival was first held in April 1996 by the Ayoung Ae-hyang Association to promote azaleas and attract hikers and tourists to revitalize the local economy. Although azaleas reach full bloom around mid-May, the festival is held during the flowering period slightly earlier than the full bloom. It celebrates the blooming of azaleas across the mountain's slopes and features a range of side events, including Sansinje (a traditional mountain spirit ritual), Baekiljang (a 100-day commemoration), and treasure hunts. Visitors often explore nearby Heungbu Village in Seongni, Namnam during the festival. A notable highlight is the "tunnel of azaleas," where flowers over 2 meters high stretch from Bonghwadae to Chijae and Goburangjae in the south.

=== Historical sites near Bonghwasan ===
Bonghwasan and its surrounding valleys—especially the Yongdam region—are rich in archaeological finds dating back to the Three Kingdoms period through the Goryeo and Joseon dynasties. Among the most significant finds are the Hwangsan-ri Ancient Tombs, located in Wolgye-ri, Yongdam-myeon. It's from the 5th-century burial site that includes 17 stone-lined tombs of Gaya style, and excavations have revealed a blend of Baekje, Gaya, and Silla pottery. At the end of Bonghwasan lies the Wajeong Site, a 5th-century settlement that has Baekje-style housing and pottery, suggesting that this was a Baekje military or trade outpost. It is located near the Geumgang River, and it is likely that it served as part of an overland route connecting Baekje and Gaya. Nearby, the Wolgye-ri Fortress—also known as Seongnam-ri Fortress or Gosanseong—is believed to be the “Dae Mountain Fortress” referenced in the Nihon Shoki. With stone walls stretching 584 meters, the fortress likely dates to the Three Kingdoms period and would have played a role in Baekje's regional defense network.

== See also ==
- List of mountains of Korea
