= Samaksan =

Mountain in Chuncheon, South Korea

Coordinates: 37°50′19″N 127°39′50″E

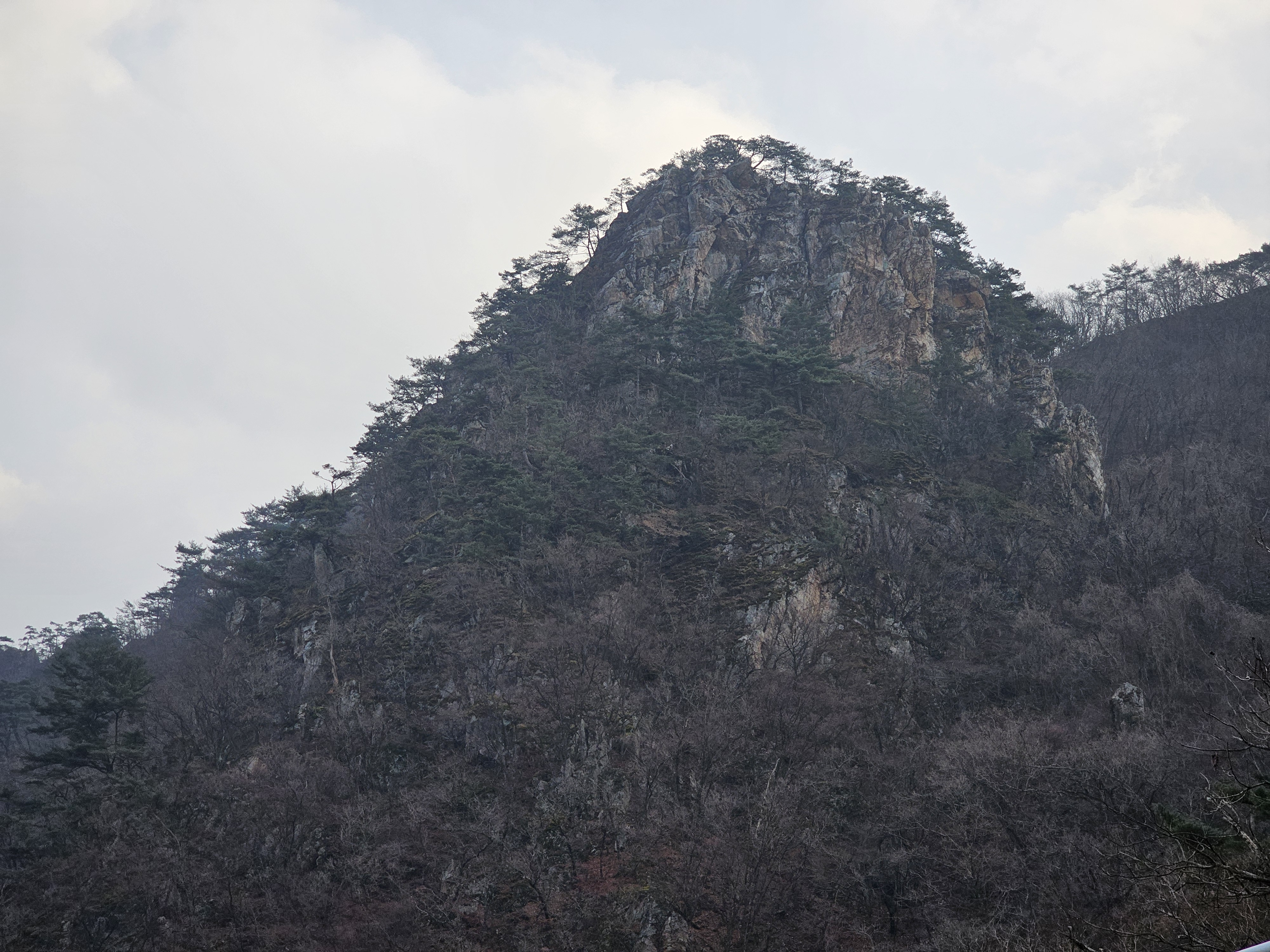

Highest point
- Elevation: 654 m (2,146 ft)

Geography
- Location: South Korea

Korean name
- Hangul: 삼악산
- Hanja: 三岳山
- RR: Samaksan
- MR: Samaksan

Samaksan (Korean: 삼악산) is a mountain in Chuncheon, Gangwon Province, South Korea. It has an elevation of 654 m (2,146 ft).

== See also ==
- List of mountains in Korea
