= Namwon =

City in North Jeolla, South Korea

- Municipal City
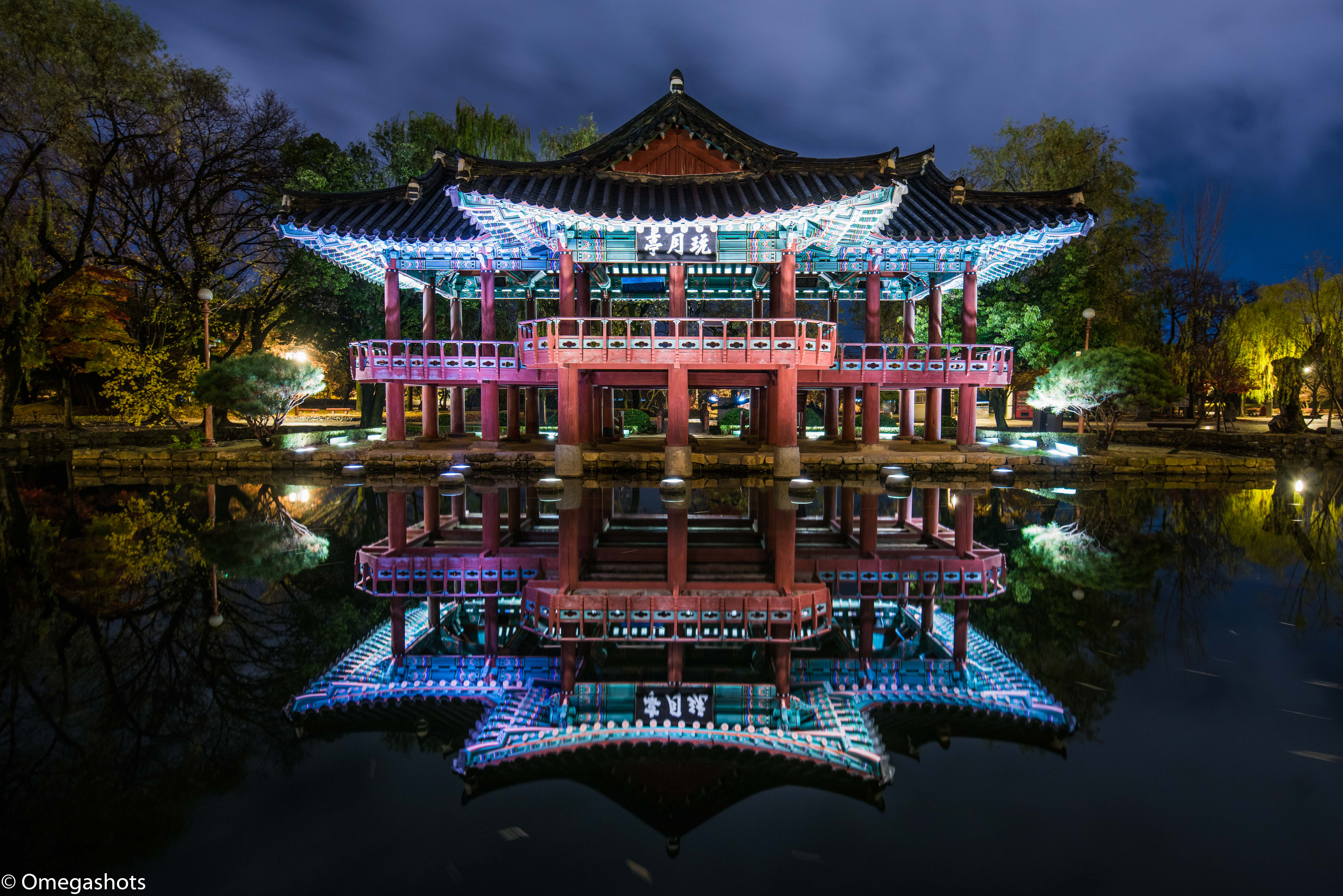
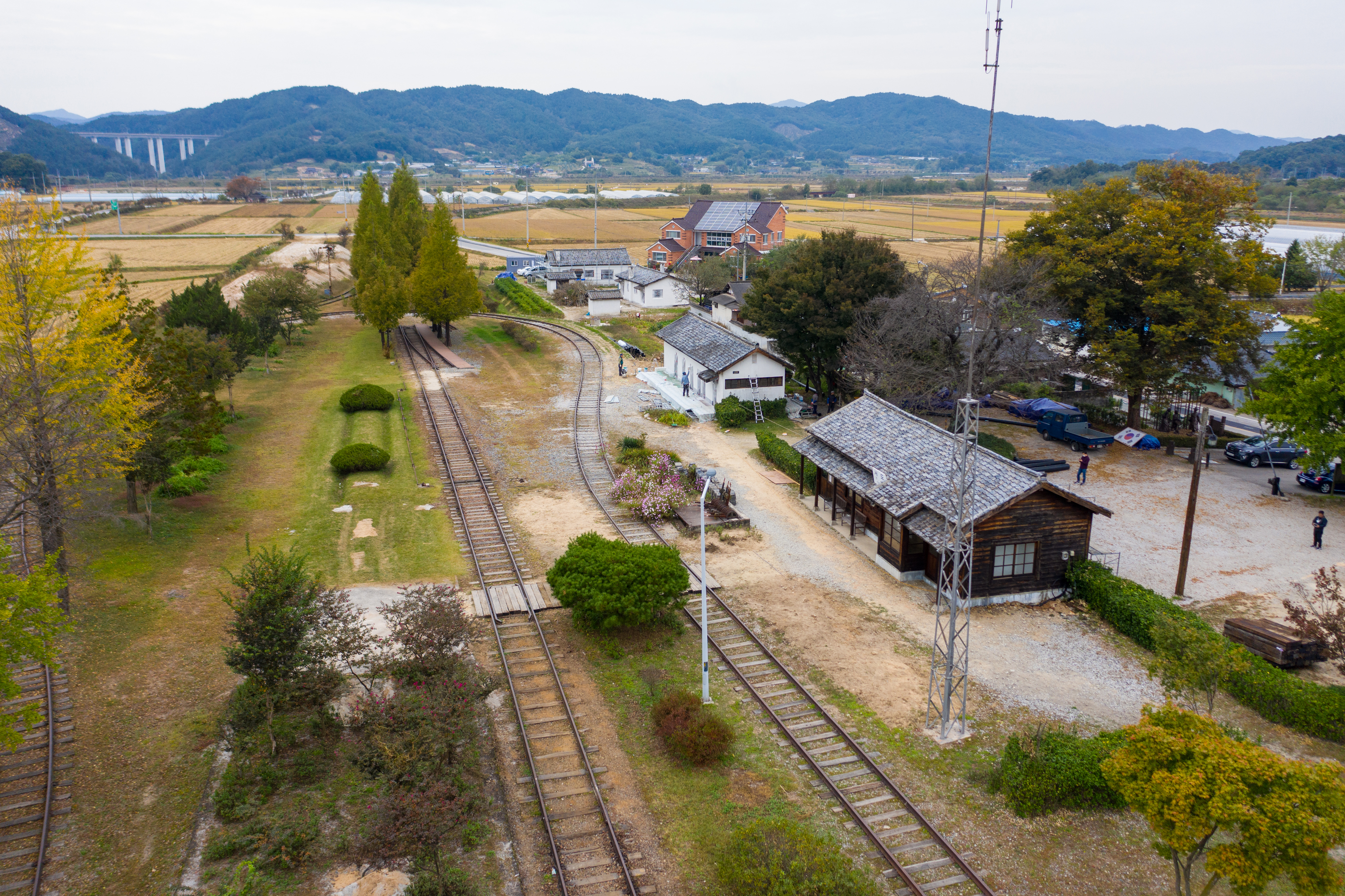
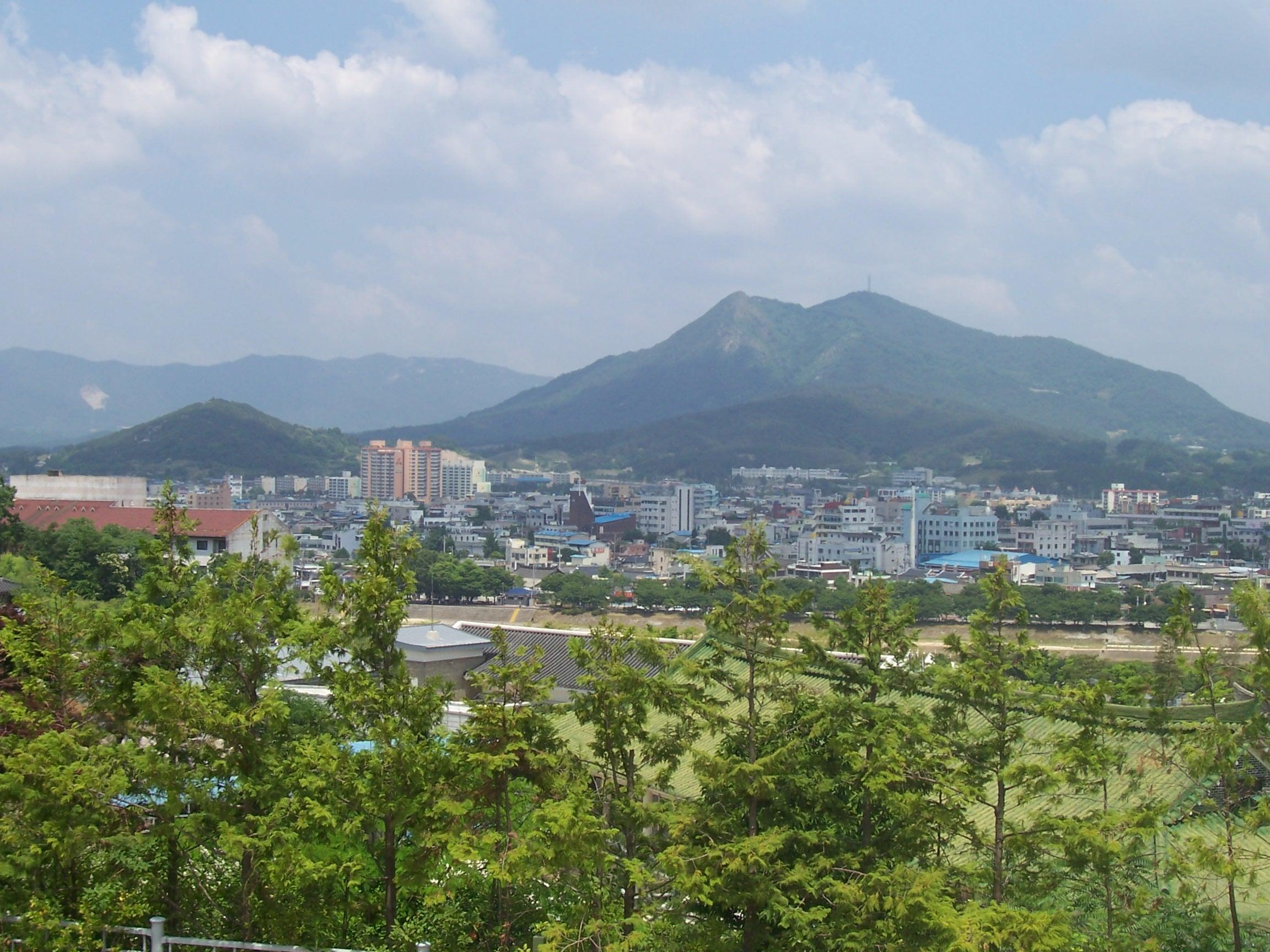
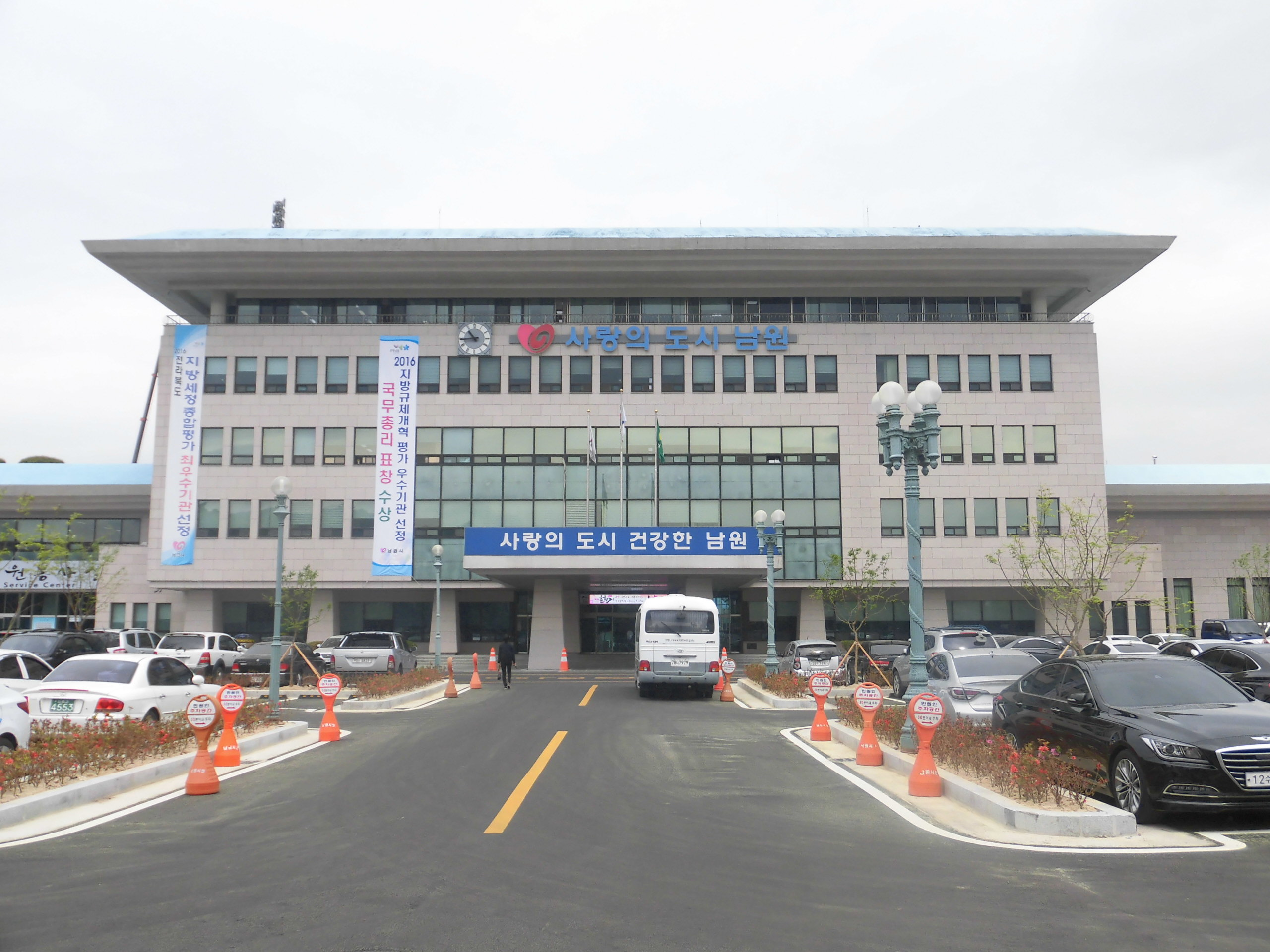
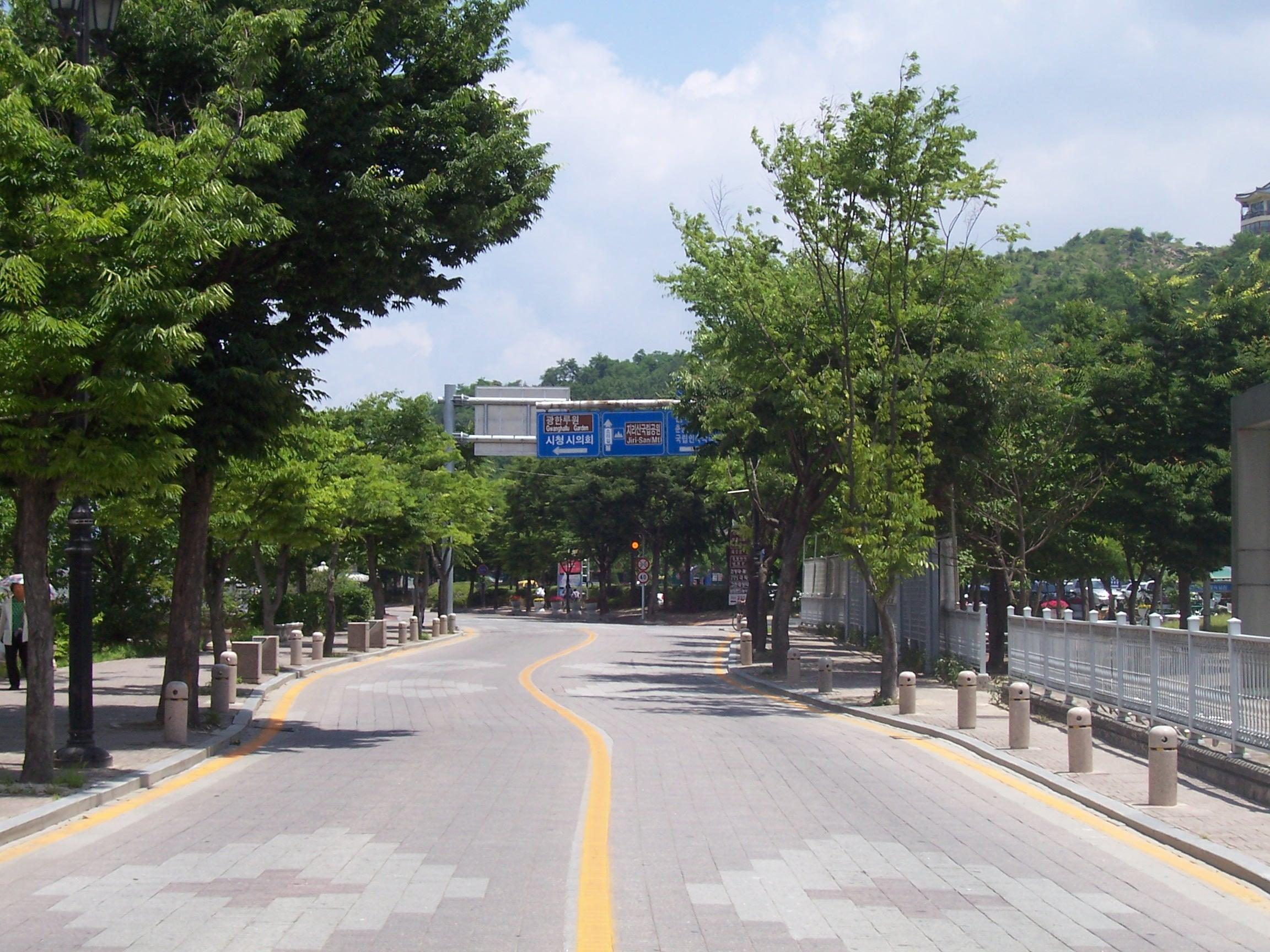
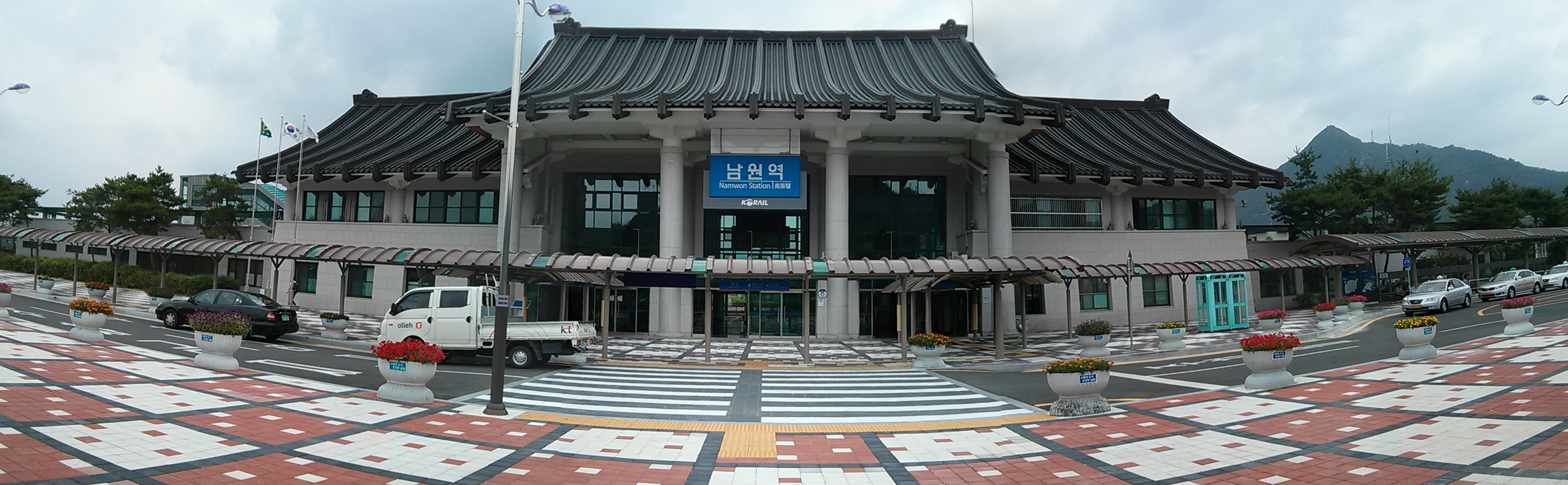
- From the left: Gwanghalluwon, Seodo station, Namwon City Hall, road, Namwon station

- Flag CI of Namwon

- Location in South Korea
- Coordinates: 35°24′36″N 127°23′9″E
- Country: South Korea
- Province: North Jeolla Province
- Administrative divisions: 1 eup, 15 myeon, 7 dong

Area
  - Total: 752.19 km^{2} (290.42 sq mi)

Population (2024)
  - Total: 73,781
  - Density: 98.088/km^{2} (254.05/sq mi)
  - Dialect: Jeolla

Korean name
- Hangul: 남원시
- Hanja: 南原市
- RR: Namwon-si
- MR: Namwŏn-si

Namwon (Korean: 남원; Korean pronunciation: [na̠m.wʌ̹n]) is a city in the North Jeolla Province in South Korea. Namwon is about 50 minutes from the provincial capital of Jeonju, which is almost three hours away from Seoul. The official city flower is Royal Azalea (철쭉) while the city tree is the crape-myrtle (배롱나무) and the city bird is the swallow (제비).

With a population of 73,781, Namwon is a mid-sized city located just outside Jirisan National Park, which has the largest set of mountains on the South Korean Mainland. It also borders the Seomjin River, one of South Korea's more prominent rivers. It is 3 hours and 15 minutes from the Seoul Central City Bus Terminal (via direct bus) and about one hour from both the U-Square Bus Terminal in Gwangju and the Jeonju Inter City Bus Terminal (depending on traffic).

It is called "the City of Love" because of the famous Korean love story of Chunhyang. Gwanghanlu Garden is a shrine to this love story.

== History ==
Namwon was founded in 680 during the reign of King Sinmun of Silla Kingdom. Namwon county was founded on April 1, 1895. The city suffered during the Siege of Namwon in 1597 during the Imjin War.

During the siege that lasted from August 13 to 16 the only defenders against the Japanese army of 56,000 men were 3300 Korean and Chinese soldiers and 6000 women and children. In the end the Japanese found a way to enter the city and killed all the soldiers and civilians.

== Geography ==
Namwon is located in a basin bordered by the Sobaek Mountains to the east and the Buheung Mountain Ridges to the west with the Yocheon River flowing through the city. Namwon is bordered by the counties of Imsil and Sunchang to the west, Jangsu to the north, Hamyang and Hadong in South Gyeongsang Province to the east, and Gurye and Gokseong in South Jeolla Province to the south.

=== Climate ===
Namwon has a humid continental climate (Köppen: Dwa), but can be considered a borderline humid subtropical climate (Köppen: Cwa) using the −3 °C (27 °F) isotherm. The average yearly temperature of Namwon is 12.3 °C (54.1 °F) with the average temperature in January being −1.4 °C (29.5 °F) and 25.4 °C (77.7 °F) in August. Due to its location in a mountainous basin with a high rate of precipitation, the climate of Namwon varies greatly. Winds in Namwon are usually weak and blow north to west in the winter and south to west in the summer. However, temperatures can sometimes (briefly) drop below −10 °C (14 °F) in January with wind chills making it feel as though it were below −15 °C (5 °F). These winds are part of a cold front that comes down from Siberia for a very brief time. Temperatures in July and August can often reach 33 °C (91 °F), with the humidity making it feel as though it were 38 °C (100 °F). The humidity over the Korean peninsula from June through September comes from south east Asia. Temperatures in spring (late April and through May) and fall (after September 25 and through October) are often in the mid 20s °C (73–80 °F) and with low humidity.

Climate data for Namwon (1991–2020 normals, extremes 1972–present)
| Month | Jan | Feb | Mar | Apr | May | Jun | Jul | Aug | Sep | Oct | Nov | Dec | Year |
|---|---|---|---|---|---|---|---|---|---|---|---|---|---|
| Record high °C (°F) | 17.5 (63.5) | 22.3 (72.1) | 26.9 (80.4) | 30.9 (87.6) | 35.2 (95.4) | 35.9 (96.6) | 37.5 (99.5) | 38.6 (101.5) | 35.8 (96.4) | 31.4 (88.5) | 26.7 (80.1) | 19.8 (67.6) | 38.6 (101.5) |
| Mean daily maximum °C (°F) | 5.0 (41.0) | 7.9 (46.2) | 13.4 (56.1) | 19.8 (67.6) | 24.8 (76.6) | 28.0 (82.4) | 30.0 (86.0) | 30.7 (87.3) | 27.0 (80.6) | 21.6 (70.9) | 14.4 (57.9) | 7.1 (44.8) | 19.1 (66.4) |
| Daily mean °C (°F) | −1.3 (29.7) | 0.9 (33.6) | 5.9 (42.6) | 11.9 (53.4) | 17.6 (63.7) | 22.1 (71.8) | 25.2 (77.4) | 25.4 (77.7) | 20.6 (69.1) | 13.6 (56.5) | 6.9 (44.4) | 0.6 (33.1) | 12.5 (54.5) |
| Mean daily minimum °C (°F) | −6.6 (20.1) | −5.0 (23.0) | −0.8 (30.6) | 4.4 (39.9) | 10.7 (51.3) | 16.9 (62.4) | 21.4 (70.5) | 21.4 (70.5) | 15.6 (60.1) | 7.3 (45.1) | 0.9 (33.6) | −4.7 (23.5) | 6.8 (44.2) |
| Record low °C (°F) | −21.9 (−7.4) | −19.3 (−2.7) | −11.6 (11.1) | −6.2 (20.8) | −0.9 (30.4) | 6.3 (43.3) | 12.0 (53.6) | 9.6 (49.3) | 3.8 (38.8) | −3.7 (25.3) | −13.6 (7.5) | −19.3 (−2.7) | −21.9 (−7.4) |
| Average precipitation mm (inches) | 28.5 (1.12) | 39.4 (1.55) | 56.7 (2.23) | 81.8 (3.22) | 90.5 (3.56) | 157.3 (6.19) | 303.2 (11.94) | 313.3 (12.33) | 144.2 (5.68) | 63.0 (2.48) | 45.3 (1.78) | 30.0 (1.18) | 1,353.2 (53.28) |
| Average precipitation days (≥ 0.1 mm) | 8.3 | 7.3 | 8.5 | 8.5 | 8.7 | 10.0 | 15.3 | 14.7 | 9.3 | 6.1 | 7.6 | 8.6 | 112.9 |
| Average snowy days | 8.1 | 5.4 | 1.8 | 0.4 | 0.0 | 0.0 | 0.0 | 0.0 | 0.0 | 0.0 | 2.4 | 6.6 | 24.3 |
| Average relative humidity (%) | 70.2 | 65.6 | 63.3 | 61.9 | 65.0 | 71.4 | 78.9 | 78.2 | 75.4 | 73.3 | 72.7 | 72.7 | 70.7 |
| Mean monthly sunshine hours | 163.6 | 175.4 | 209.5 | 221.9 | 235.7 | 188.2 | 159.8 | 180.4 | 179.2 | 196.9 | 163.2 | 155.7 | 2,229.5 |
| Percentage possible sunshine | 50.5 | 56.9 | 54.7 | 56.6 | 51.4 | 42.0 | 35.9 | 42.2 | 48.7 | 56.4 | 52.5 | 51.2 | 49.4 |
Source: Korea Meteorological Administration (snow and percent sunshine 1981–2010)

== Demographics ==
Historical population
| Year | Pop. | ±% |
|---|---|---|
| 1970 | 176,460 | — |
| 1980 | 155,088 | −12.1% |
| 1990 | 124,524 | −19.7% |
| 2000 | 94,926 | −23.8% |
| 2010 | 78,770 | −17.0% |
| 2020 | 78,097 | −0.9% |
Source: Korean Statistical Information Service

As of 2024, the population is 21,493, of which 49.0% are male and 51.0% are female. Minors make up 11.4% of the population, and seniors make up 32.4%. Foreigners make up 2.6% of the population.

=== Religion ===
As of 2015, 14.1% of the population follow Buddhism, 24.8% follow Christianity (of which 20.9% Protestantism and 3.9% Catholicism), 1.7% follow other religions and 59.4% are irreligious.

== Festivals ==
=== Chunhyang festivals ===
The Chunhyang festival, that commemorates the love, fidelity and integrity of Chunhyang, started when female Korean entertainers created a fund to have a ceremony to honour Chunhyang in 1931, at a time when Korea was colonized by Japan. The festival is known as a festival for love through which the city of Namwon and the cultural assets of Chunhyang are promoted to the global community.

The Chunhyang festival, one of the 10 most celebrated festivals in Korea, attracts not only Korean participants but has also become popular among foreigners. Miss Chunhyang Beauty Pageant and other events make the festival memorable and fun for visitors.

The main bridge that crosses the river that runs through the middle of the city is lit up, and along the river bank there are vendors selling food and items of all kinds. The Chunhyang beauty contest can be entered by the most beautiful female residents, in Hanbok (traditional dress). Another event is the Chunhyang parade which runs through cordoned sections of the city along the river bank, and which comprises just about the entire complement of the city's mid-grade schoolgirls (numbering probably in the low hundreds) who are dressed in full chogori and carry musical instruments of some type, and who march in a very long line. There are also other parades of men and anyone else who is not a young girl may dress up in traditional dress and join the procession. The festival lasts four days and fireworks are launched every night.

For the rest of the year when the festival is not on, there is a small theme park dedicated to Chunhyang (Namwon Tourist Complex) complete with hypothetical dwellings and surroundings that someone like Chunhyang would have had (a mock house and yard). There are other sights in the park unrelated to Chunhyang such as a fish pond where visitors are free to feed the fish and some old-fashioned swings and horseshoe-style throwing games. Outside the park, along the river bank, there are also mini paddle boats that people can rent to traverse the small river.

=== Baraebong Royal Azalea Festival ===
From the end of April to mid May, Mt.Jiri is filled with their vivid red and pink flowers. Tourists can see crimson red flowers from the peak of Barae Bong of 1,165m down to Pal Rang Chi. There is a botanical garden and a herb valley nearby Barae Bong.

=== Namwon Herb Festival ===
Namwon Herb Festival, holds at Jirisan Mt. Herb Valley every spring and autumn, showcases many herbs that grow around Jirisan Mt.

=== Heungbu Festival ===
Namwon is the setting of a Korean traditional novel named Heungbujeon (story of Heungbu), and this festival is one of the most popular local events. Heungbu Festival opens on September 9 every year in lunar calendar to celebrate the friendship and love of a man named heungbu. Since the first festival held in 1993, it has offered various events including Heungbu theater, farm music competitions and food tasting event made with gourds.

== Attractions ==
Namwon 'The City of Love' has a lot to offer. It has a very clean environment surrounded by Jiri Mountain Jirisan National Park. Much of its local and traditional culture and nature have been preserved compared to other places in Korea.

- Chunhyang Theme Park
- Honbul Literary House
- Wanwoljeong Pavilion
- Gyoryongsanseong Fortress
- Korean Traditional Music Holy Grand
- Silsangsa Temple(Historic Site No.309)
- Hwangsan Battle Monument(Historic Site No.104)
- Manin Cemetery of Righteous Warriors (Historic Site No.272)
- Manbok Temple Site, constructed between 1046 and 1083 during the rule of King Munjong of Goryeo
- Gwanghallu Garden, a traditional garden that symbolizes the universe (commonly attributed to the Chunhyang story)

== Notable people ==
- Yang Ji-in (양지인), South Korean sports shooter
- Yongseong (Real Name: Baek Sanggyu, 백상규), Korean Buddhist master
- C.W. Kim (Real Name: Chon Won, 천원), Korean American architect
- Kim Choon-ho (김춘호), South Korean former professional tennis player
- Choi Ihn-suk (최인석), South Korean writer, playwright and screenwriter
- Chang Yoon-hee (장윤희), South Korean former female volleyball player
- Jang Deog-cheon (장덕천), South Korean lawyer, politician and current mayor of Bucheon
- Choe Kang-wook (최강욱), South Korean lawyer, politician and the President of the Open Democratic Party (ODP)
- Seo Sun-hwa (서선화), South Korean sports shooter
- Oh Eun-sun (오은선), South Korean mountaineer
- Jungyup (Real Name: Ahn Jung-yeop, 안정엽), singer and leader of the South Korean R&B group Brown Eyed Soul
- Huihyeon (Real Name: Ki Hui-hyeon, 기희현), singer, rapper, dancer, actress and K-pop idol, leader and member of K-pop girlgroup DIA and its subunit BinChaenHyunSeuS

== International relations ==
=== Twin towns - sister cities ===
- Asan, South Chungcheong, South Korea
- Guro, Seoul, South Korea
- Marina, California, United States https://cityofmarina.org
- , Miryang, South Gyeongsang South Korea
- Lompoc, California, United States
- Seocho, Seoul, South Korea
- Yancheng, Jiangsu, China

=== Friendship cities ===
- Verona, Veneto, Italy
- Hangzhou, Zhejiang, China
- Hioki, Kagoshima, Japan

== See also ==
- List of cities in South Korea
- Geography of South Korea

== Gallery ==
Namwon Countryside Scenery

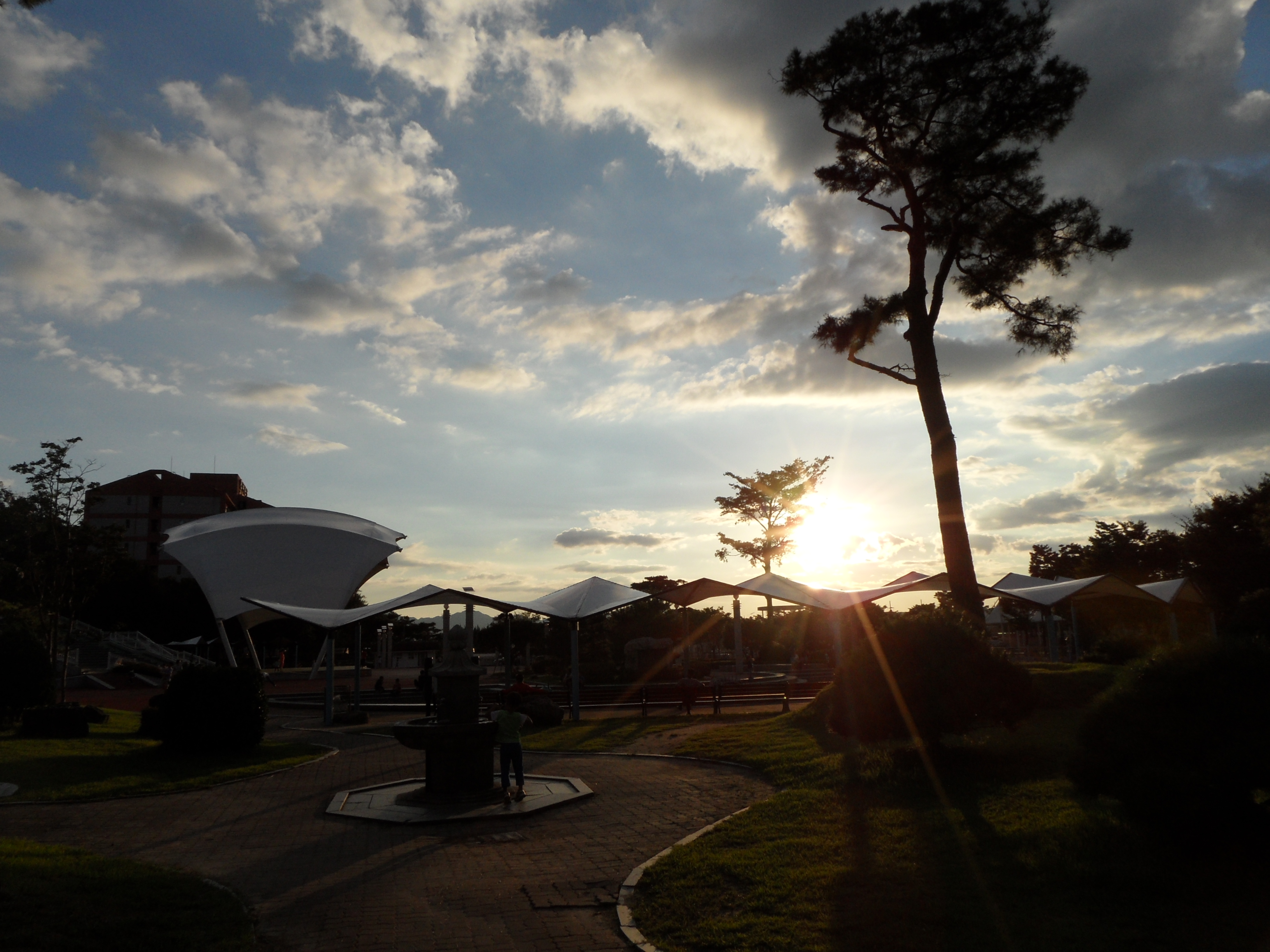
Namwon Tourist Complex - 2010 (1)

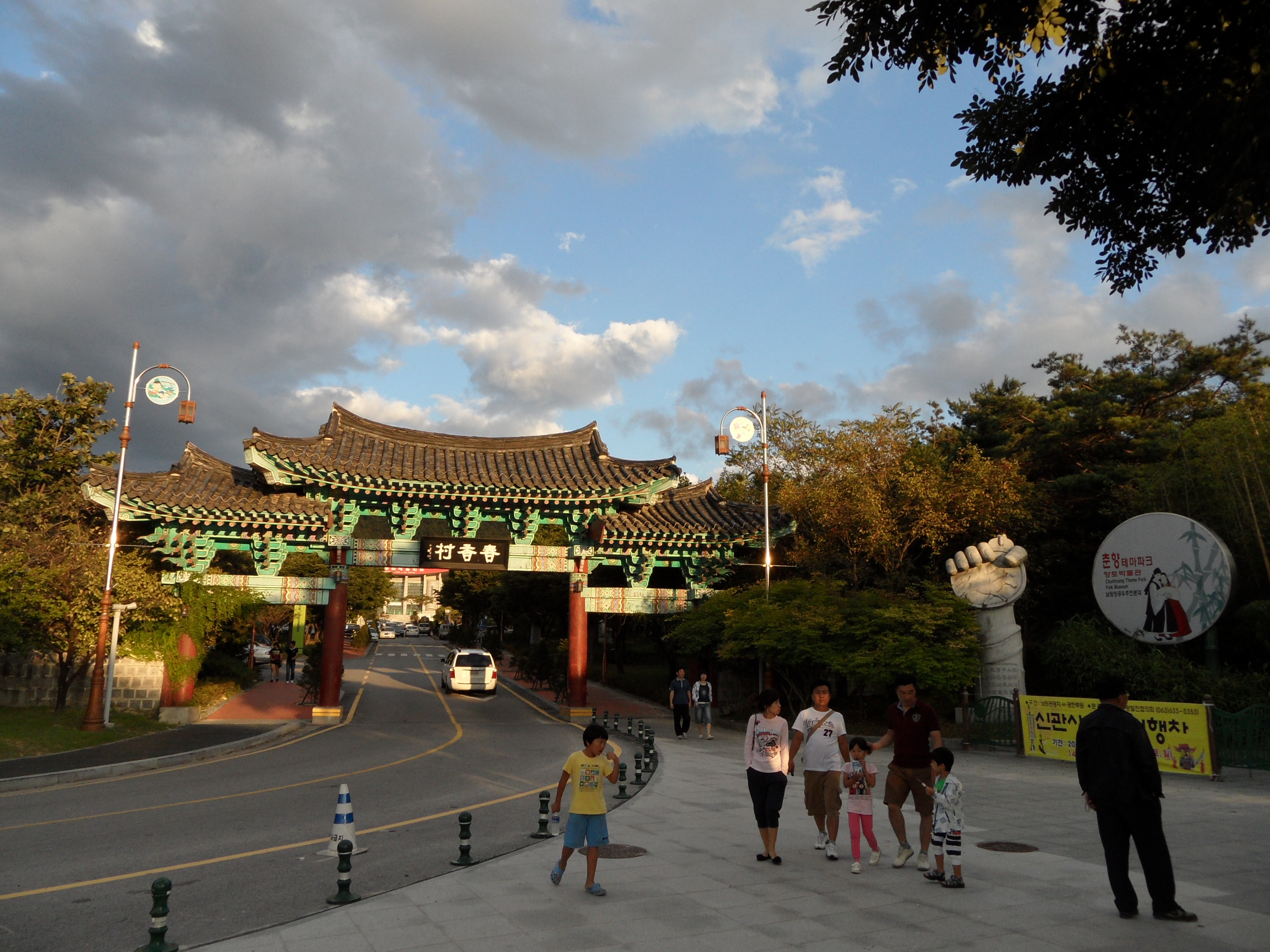
Namwon Tourist Complex - 2010 (2)

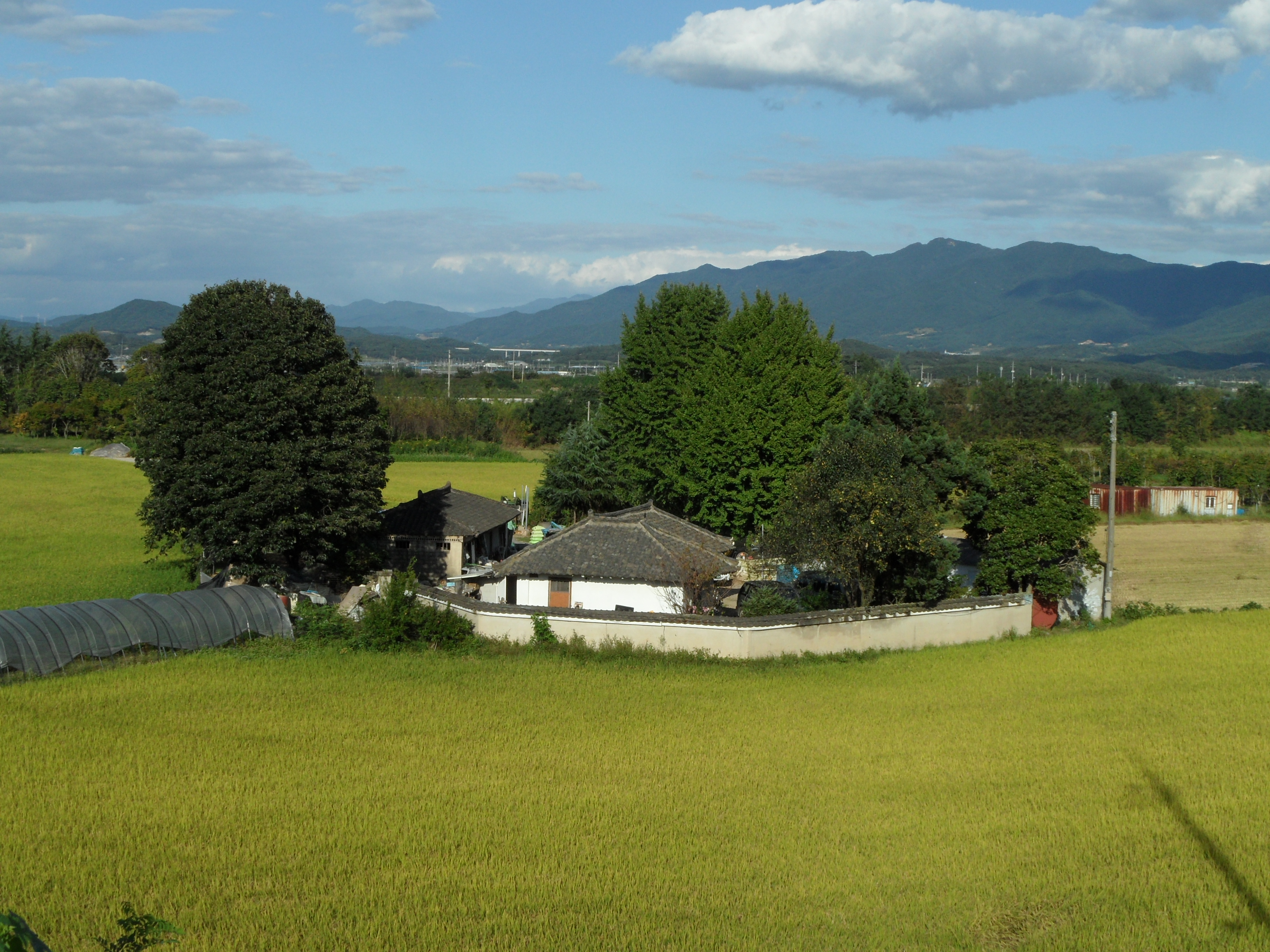
Namwon Countryside - Keumji Myeon - 2010(1)

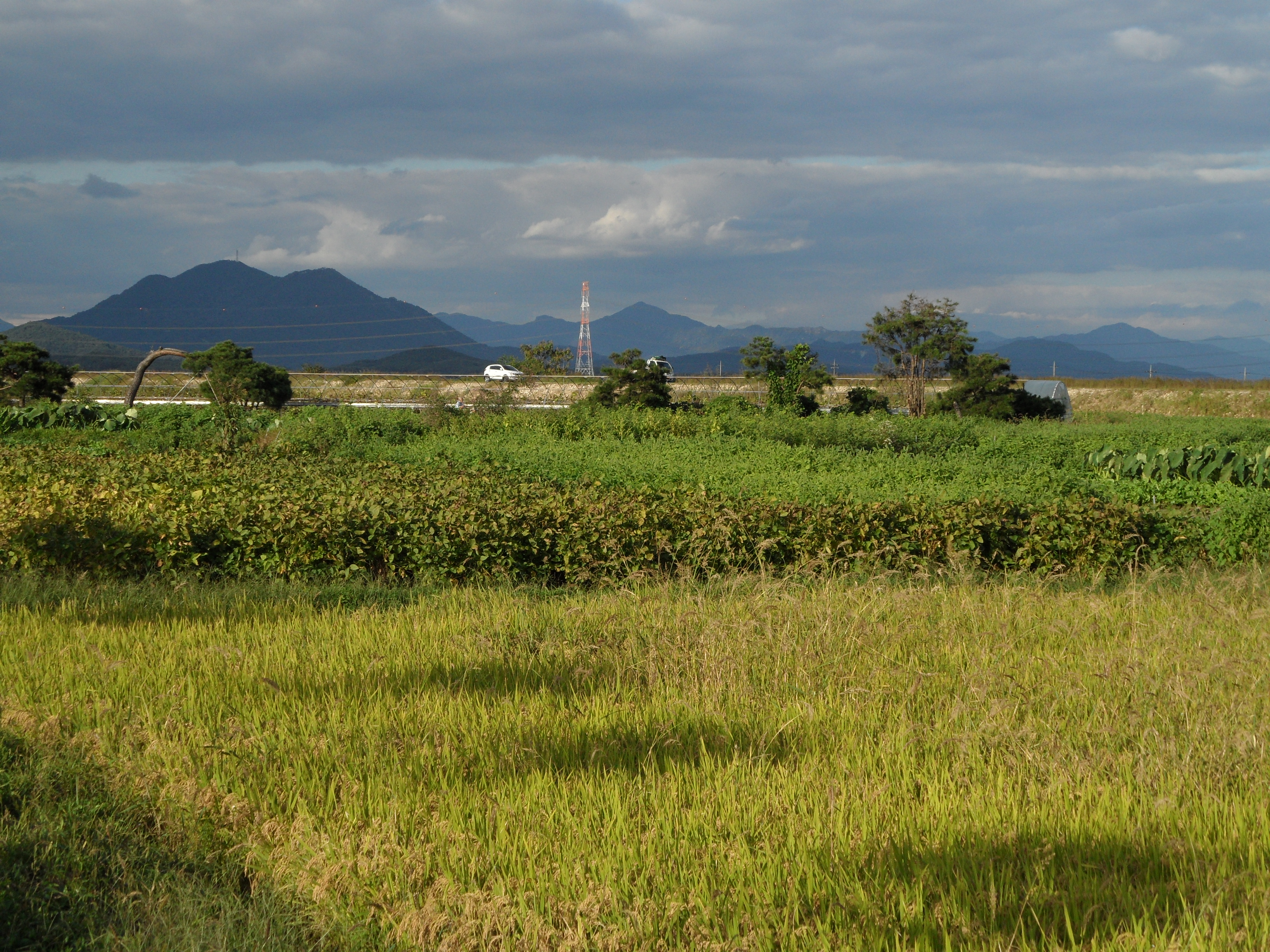
Namwon Countryside - Keumji Myeon - 2010(2)

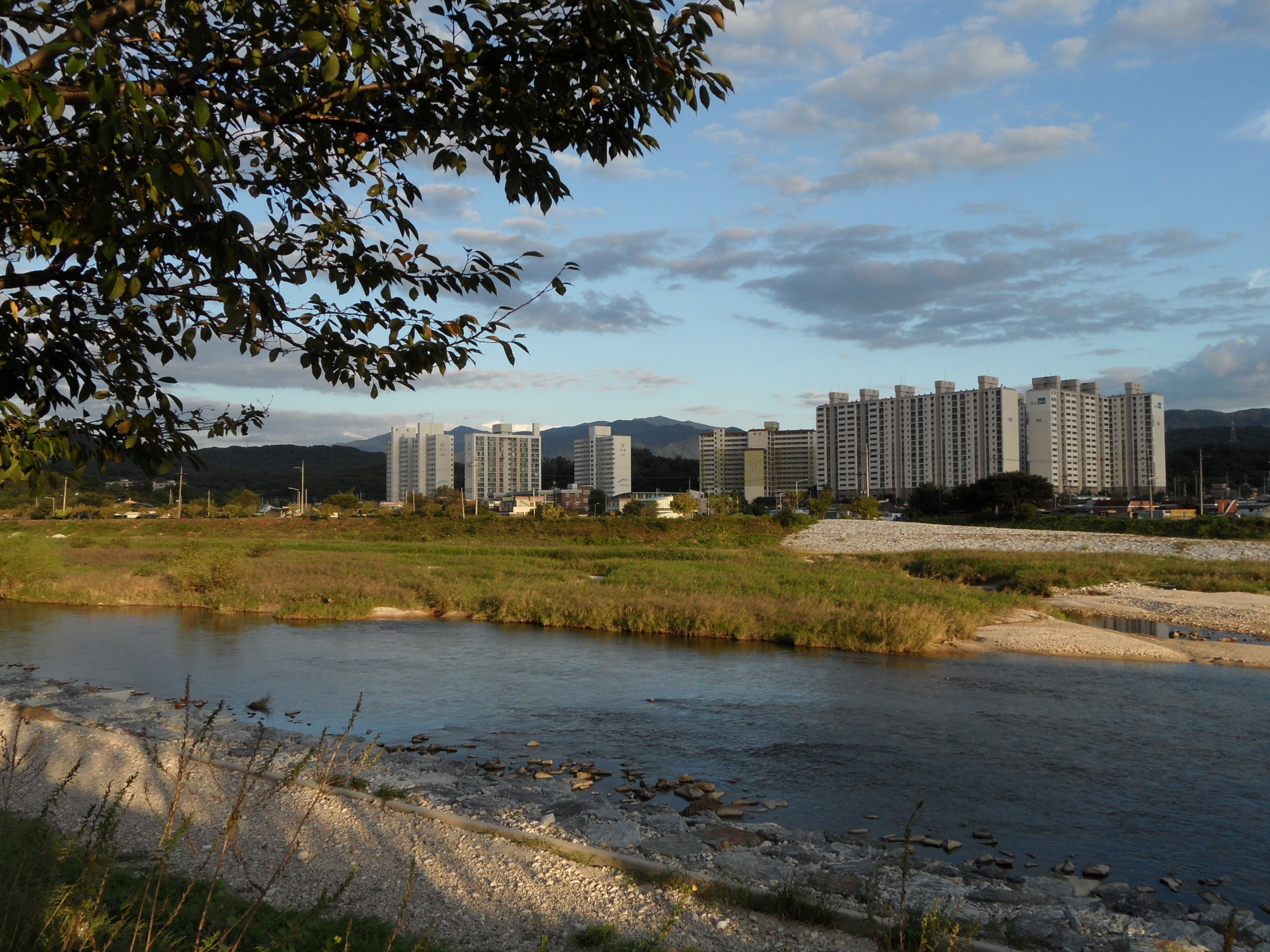
Namwon Countryside - Keumji Myeon - 2010(3)

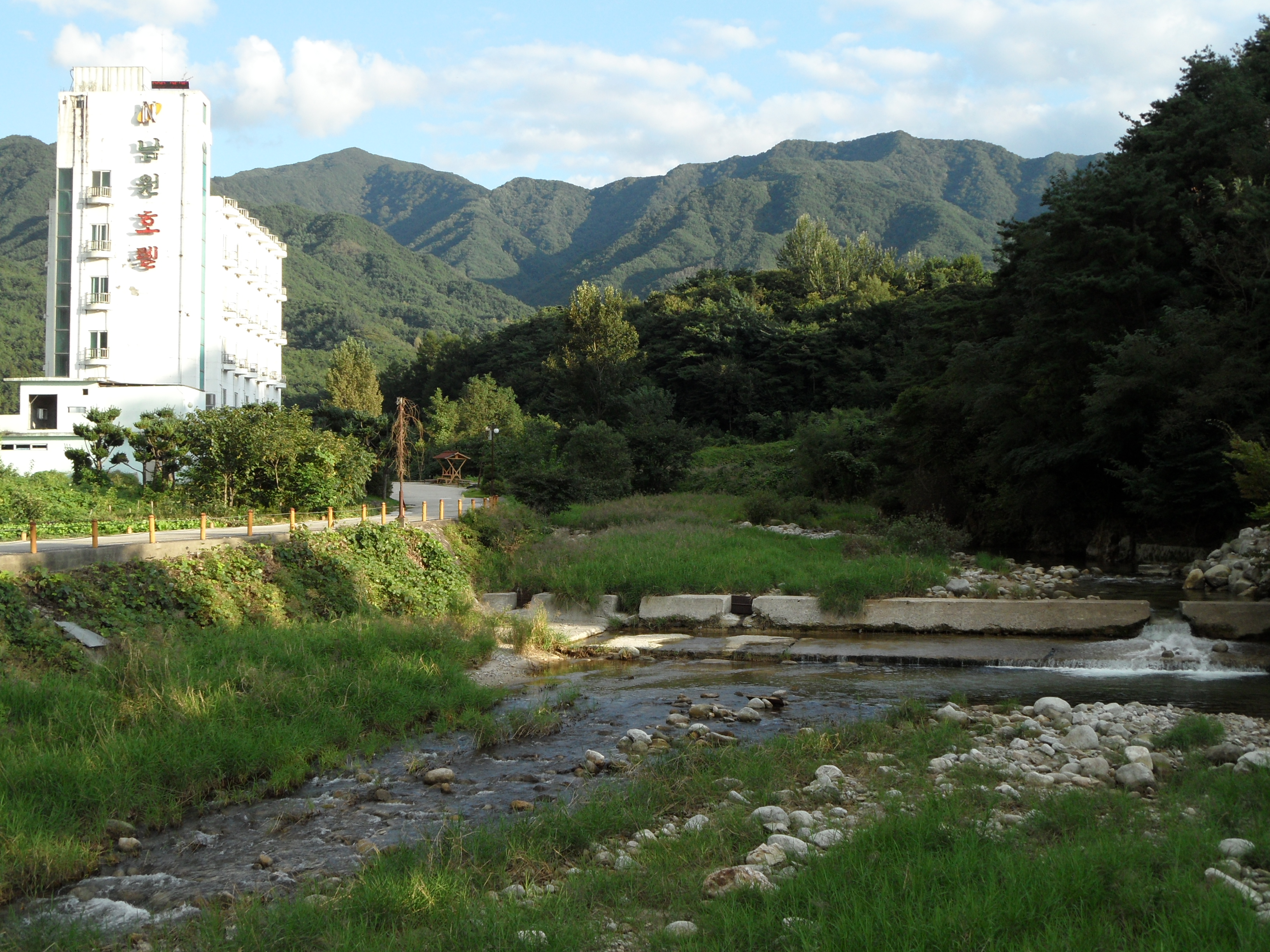
Namwon Countryside - Jucheon Myeon - 2010(1)

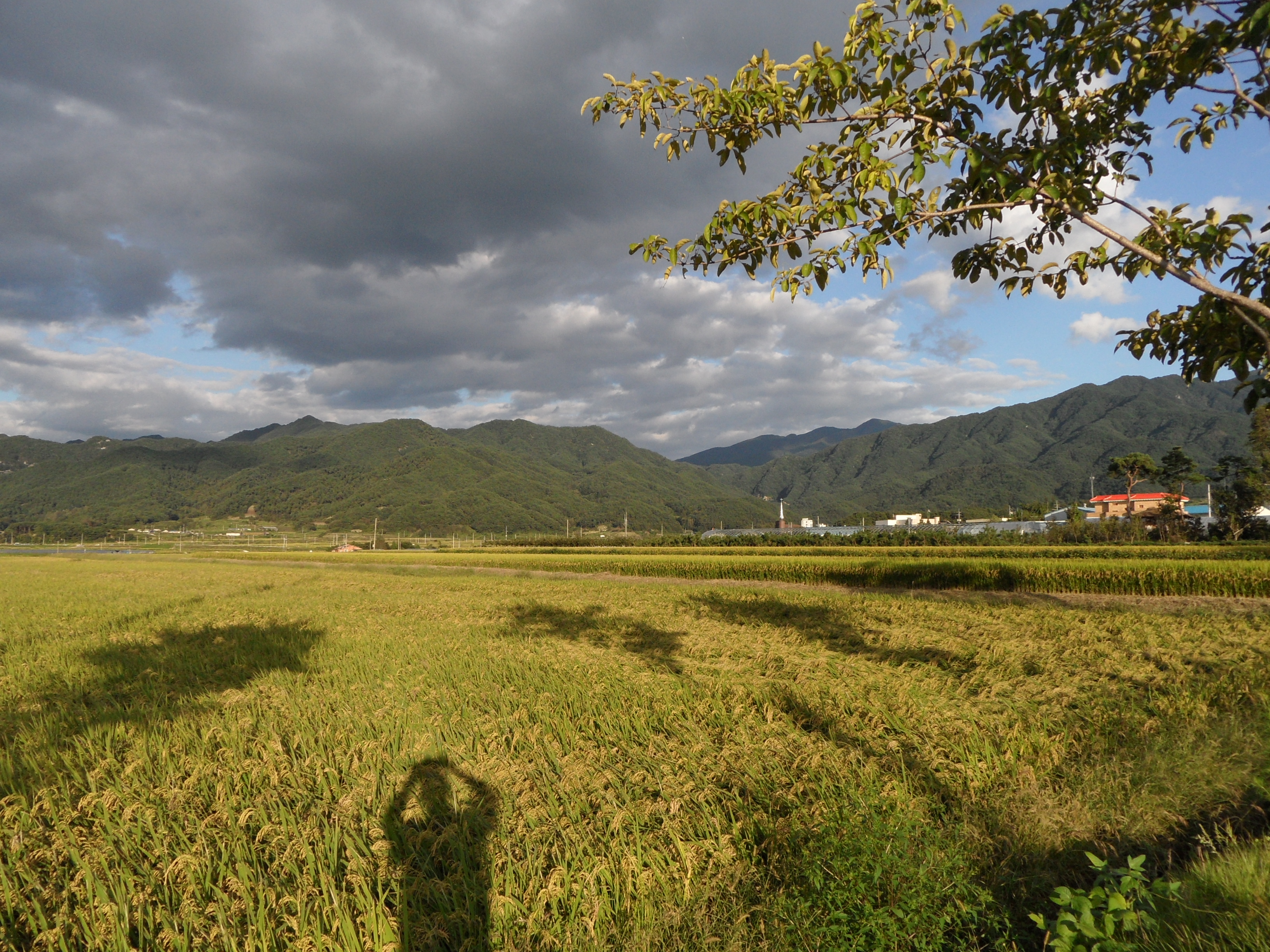
Namwon Countryside - Jucheon Myeon - 2010(2)

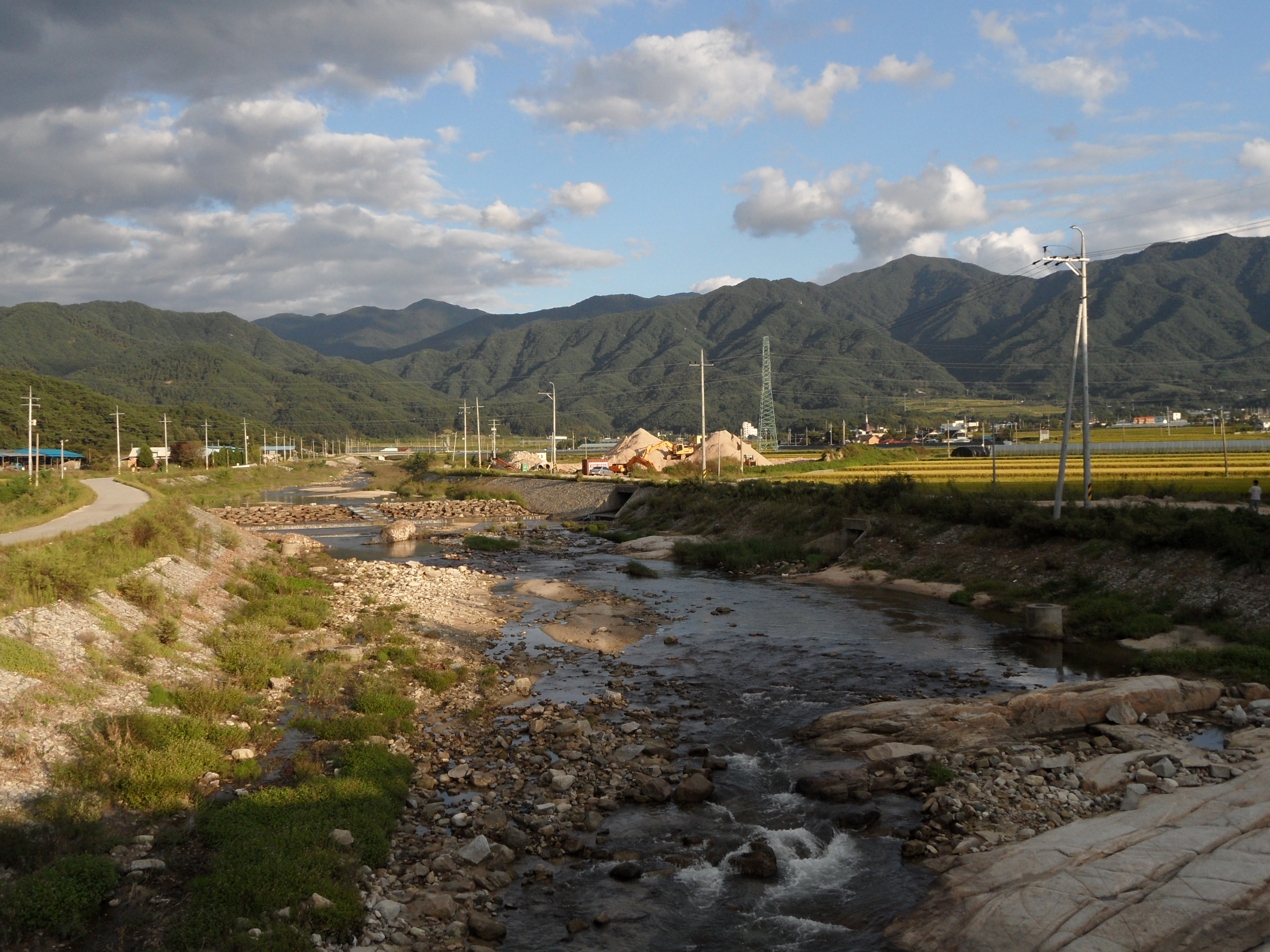
Namwon Countryside - Jucheon Myeon - 2010(3)

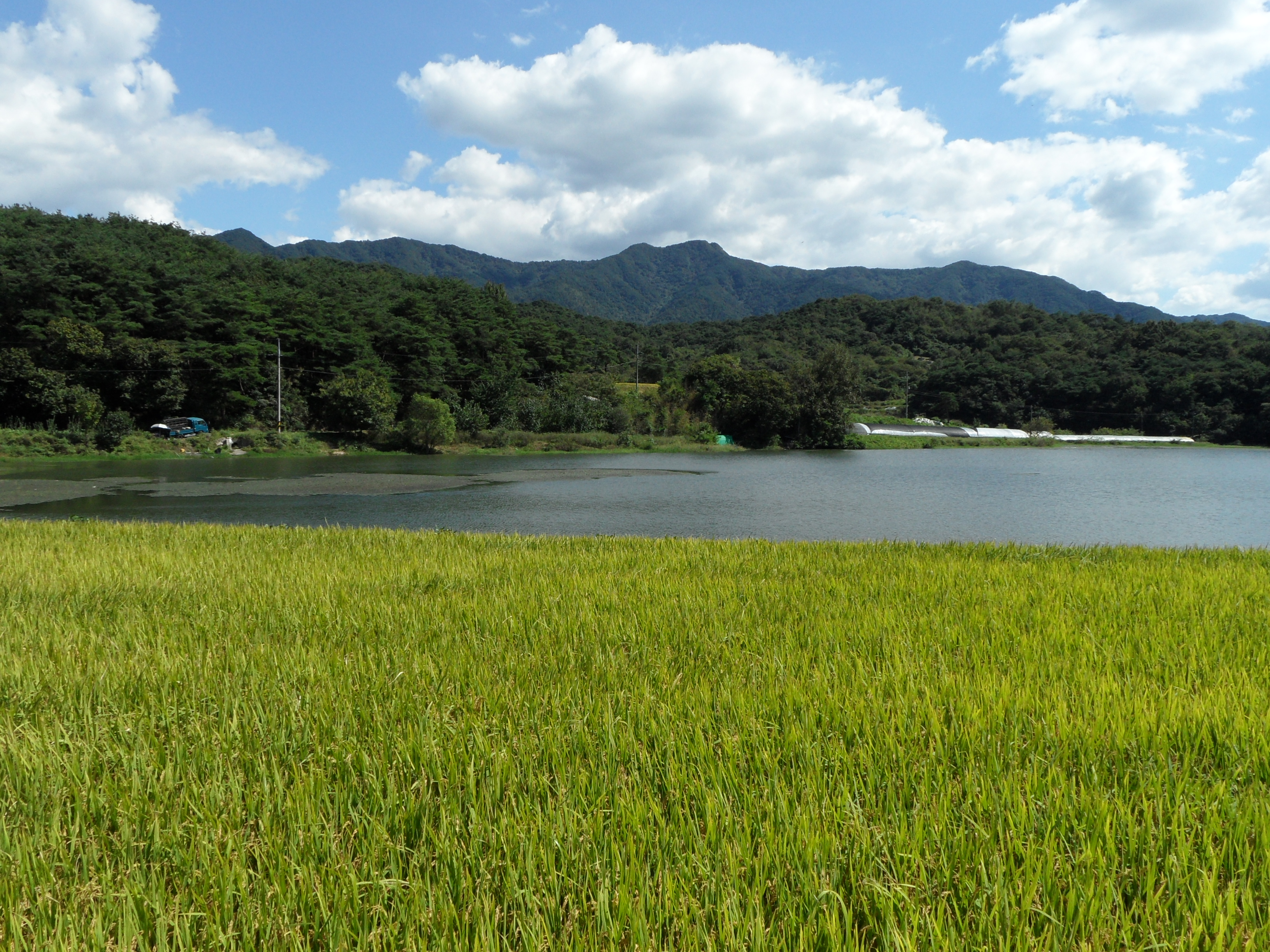
Namwon Countryside - Suji Myeon - 2010(1)

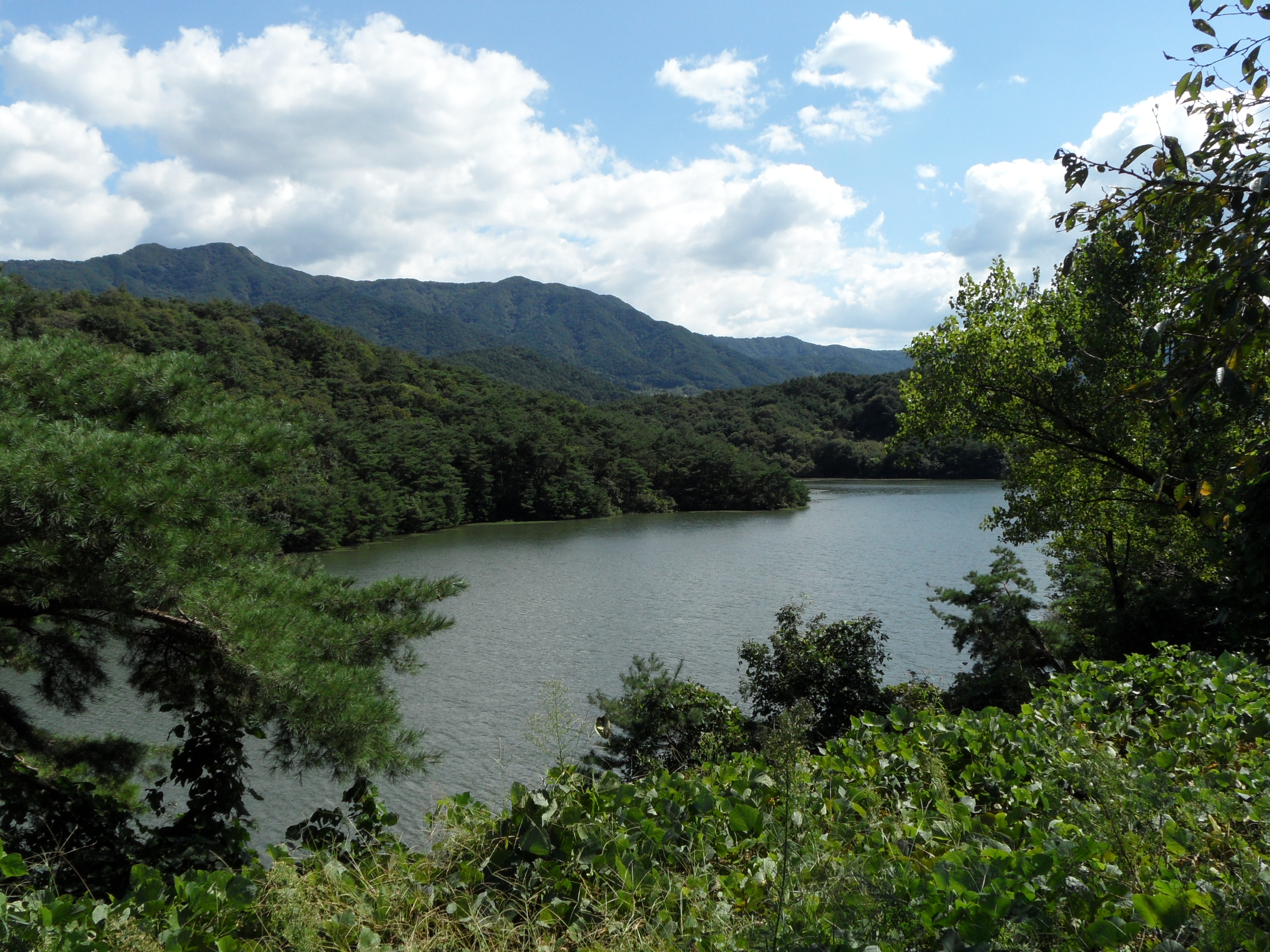
Namwon Countryside - Suji Myeon - 2010(2)

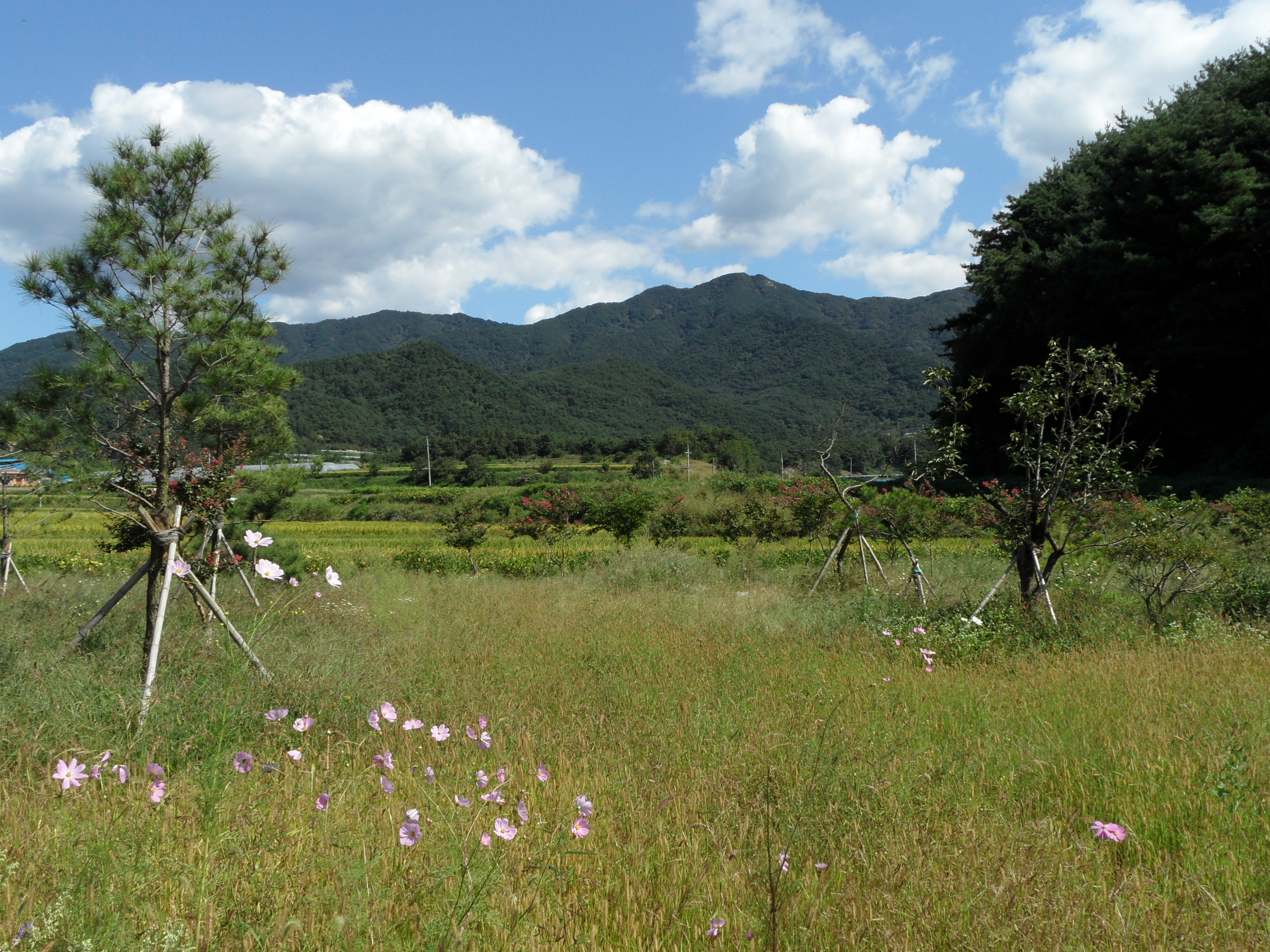
Namwon Countryside - Suji Myeon - 2010(3)

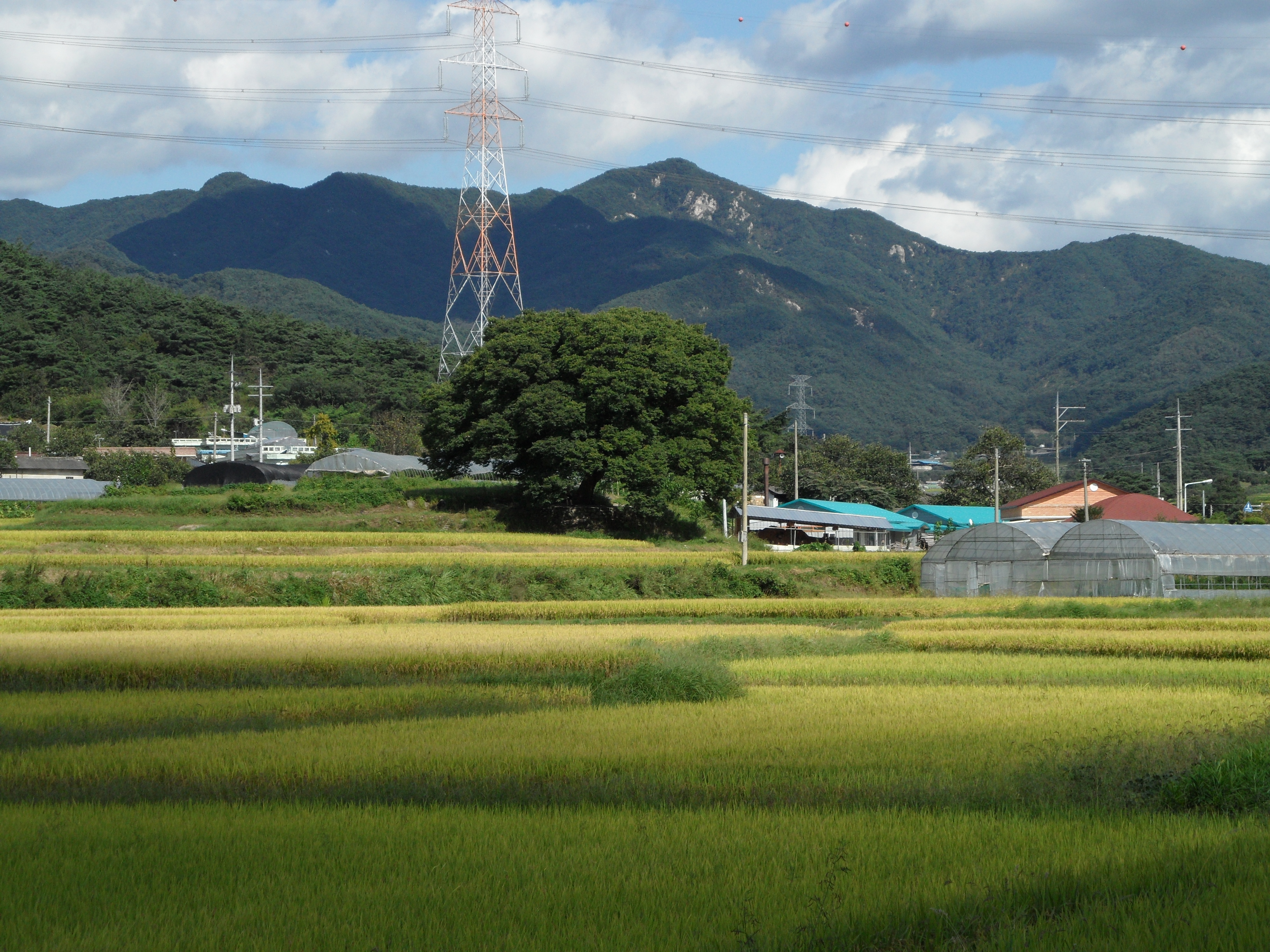
Namwon Countryside - Ibeak Myeon - 2010(1)

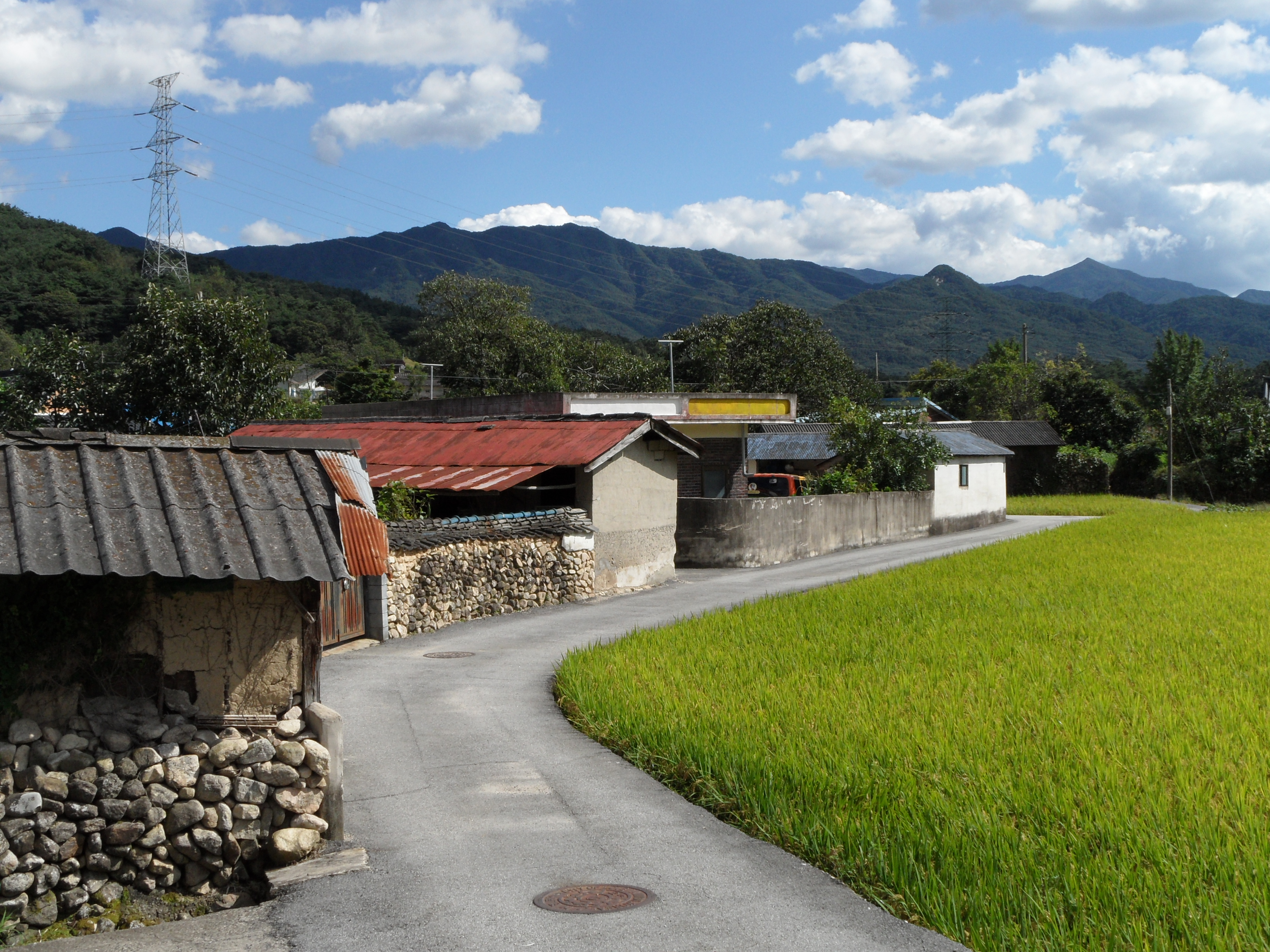
Namwon Countryside - Ibeak Myeon - 2010(2)

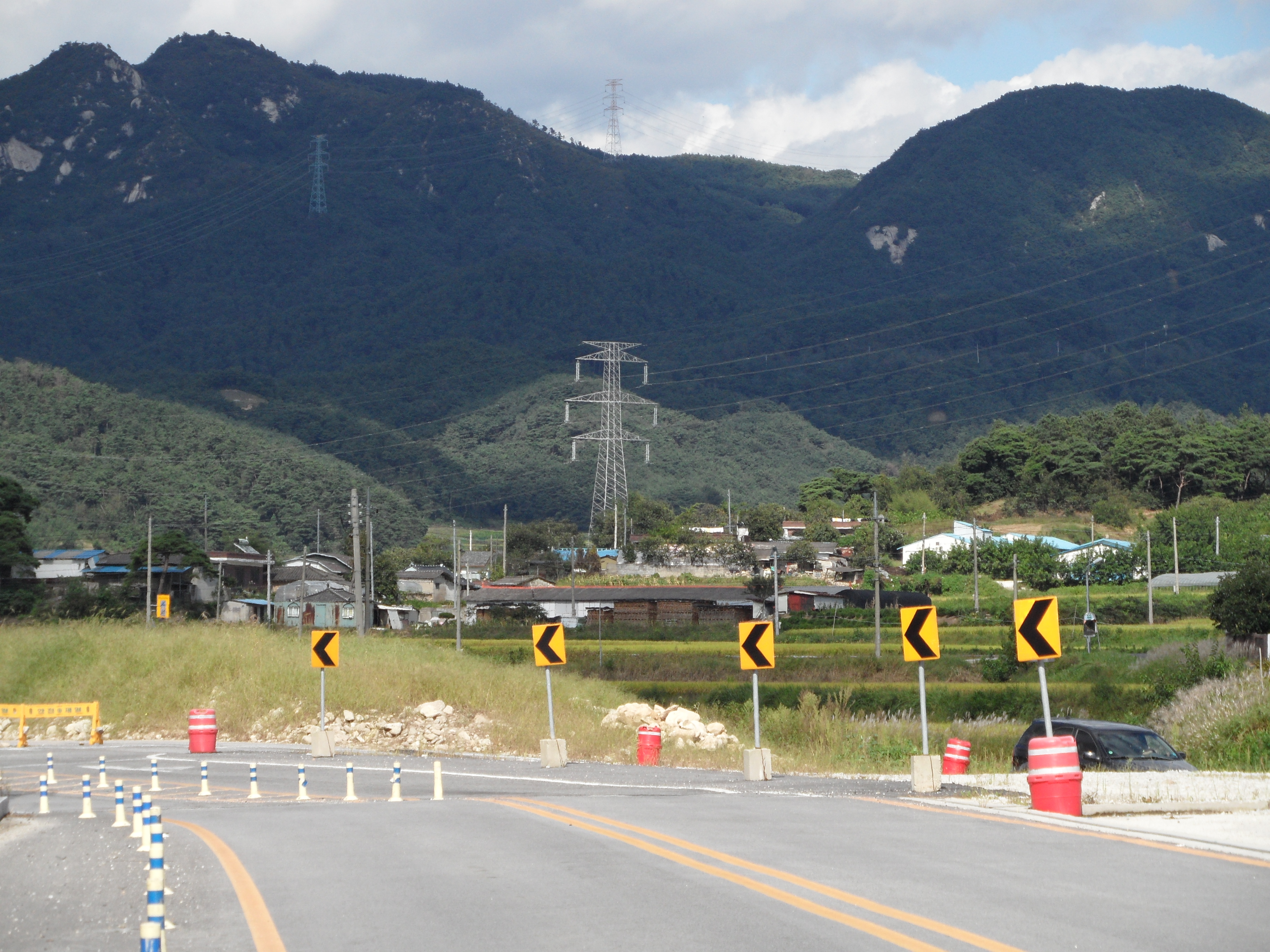
Namwon Countryside - Ibeak Myeon - 2010(3)

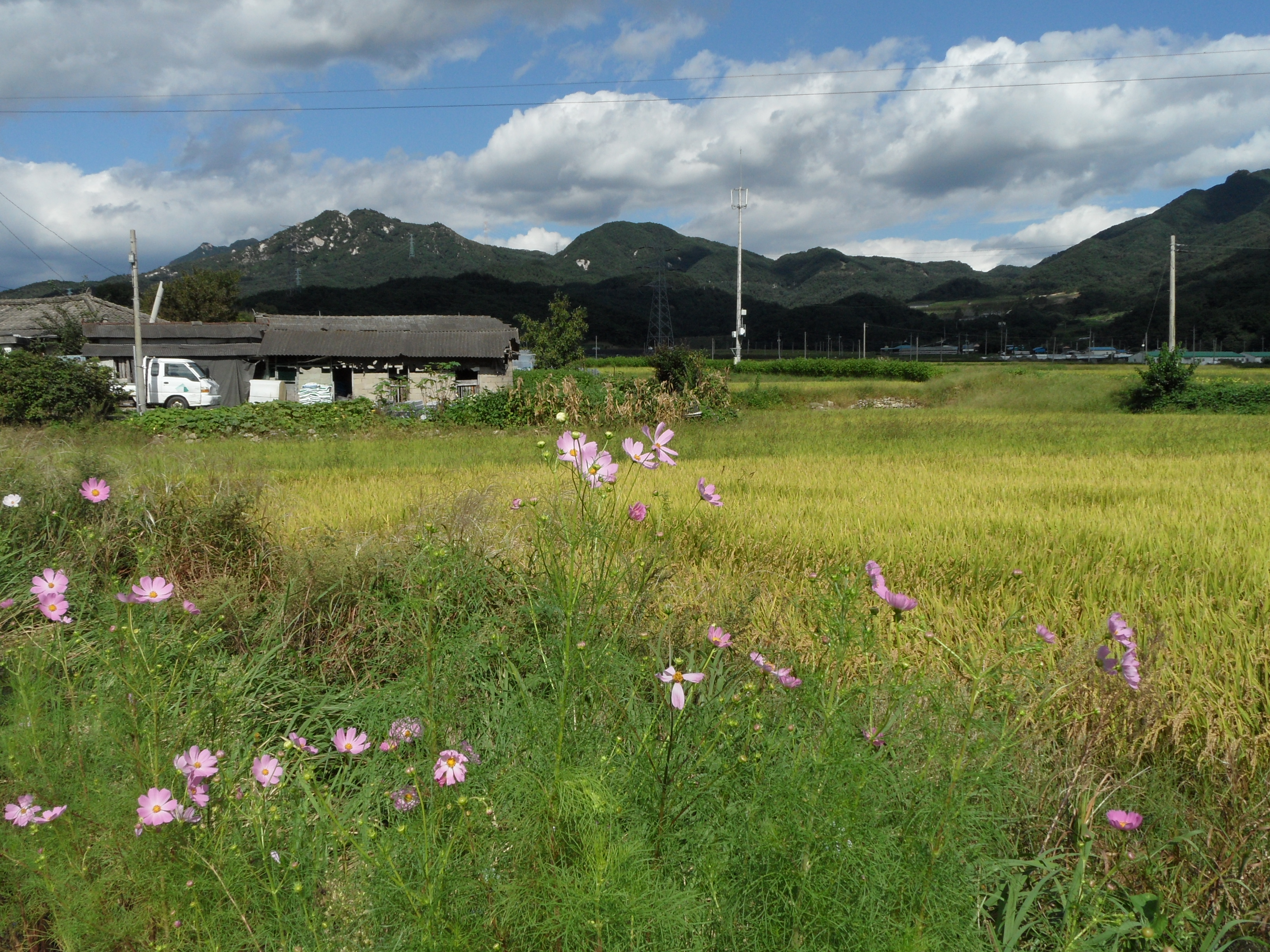
Namwon Countryside - Ibeak Myeon - 2010(4)

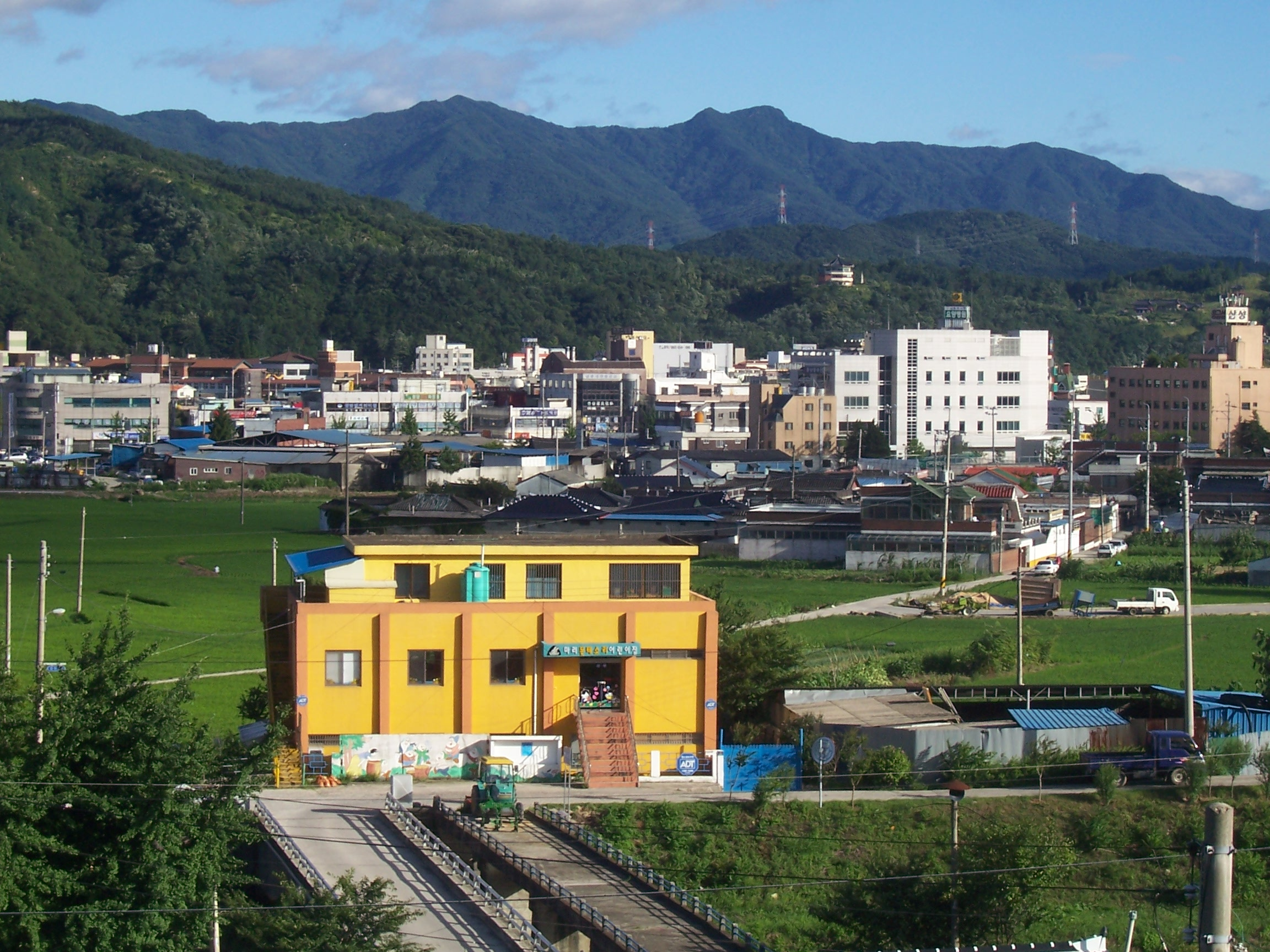
Namwon on a clear summer day - July, 2007.

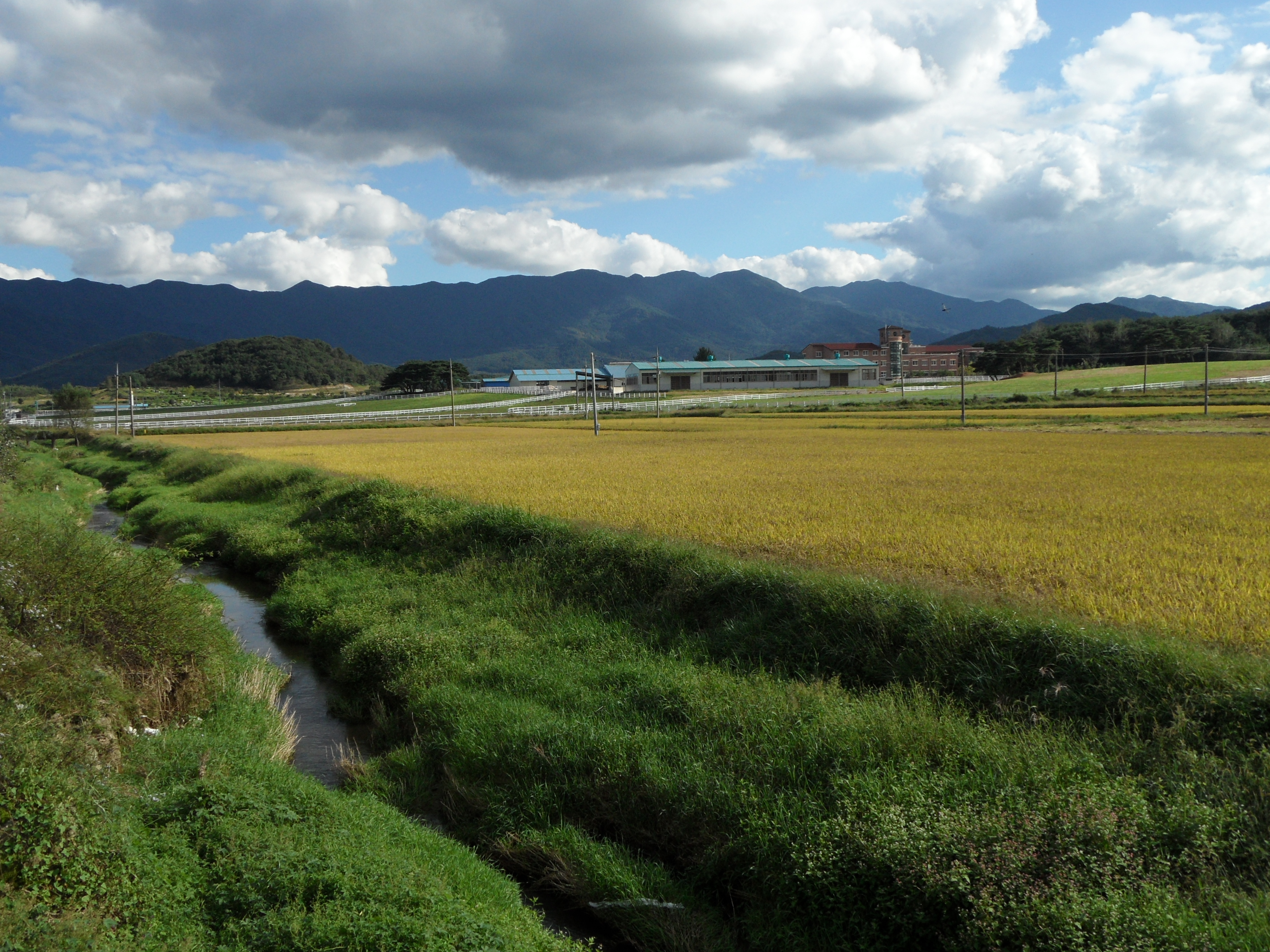
Namwon Countryside - Unbong Myeon - 2010(1)

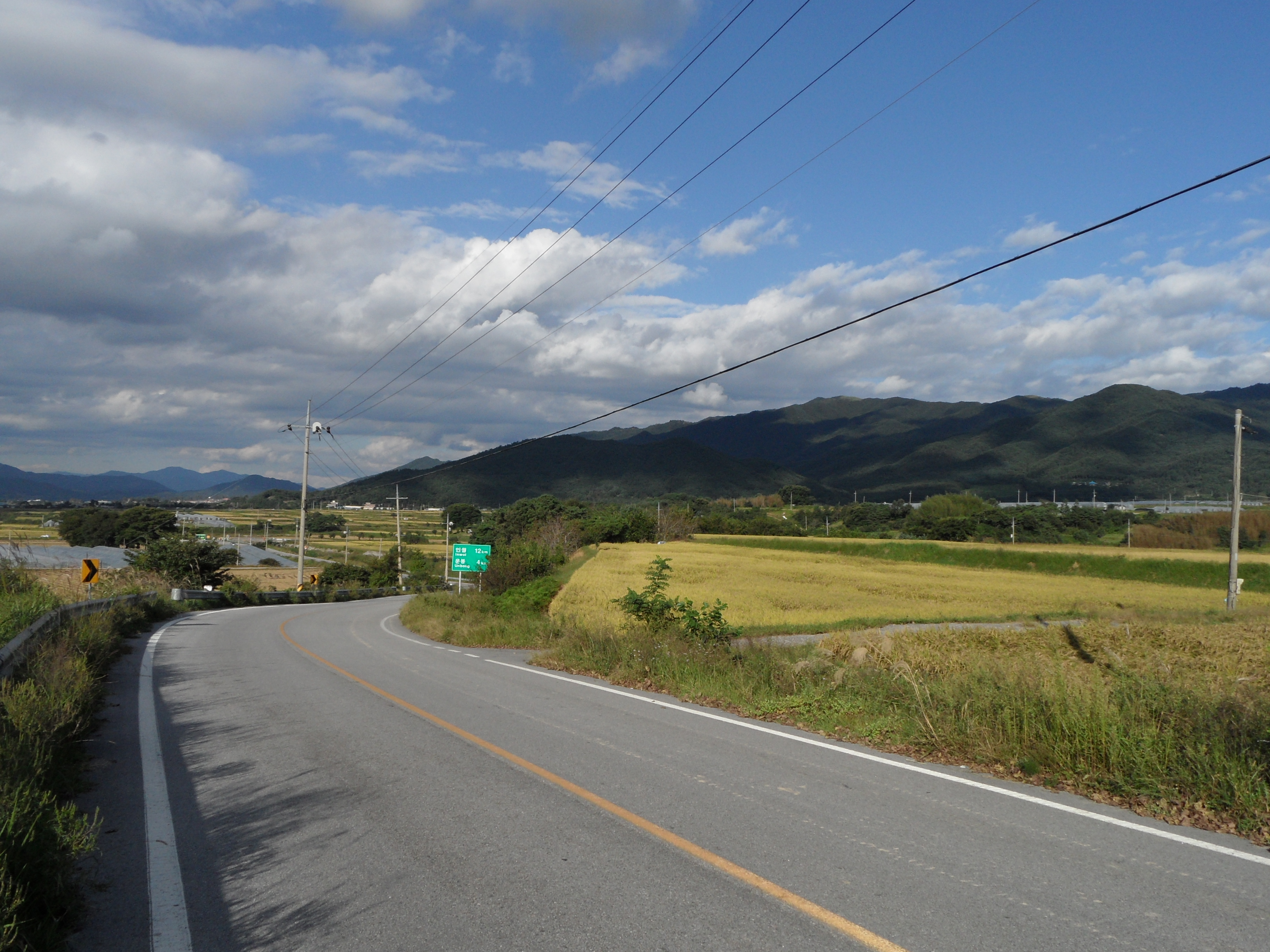
Namwon Countryside - Unbong Myeon - 2010(2)

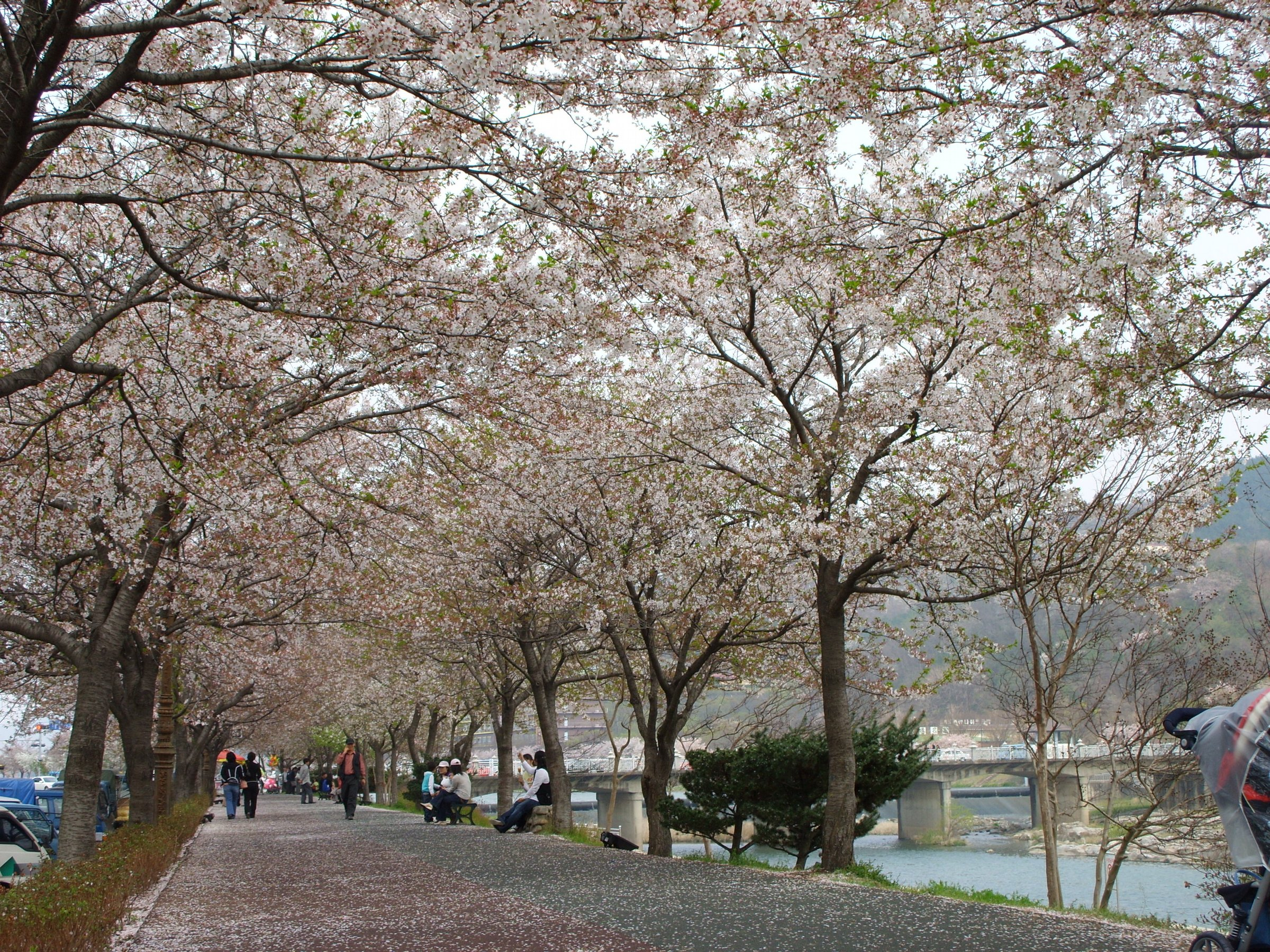
Yocheon River in spring (2008) - I

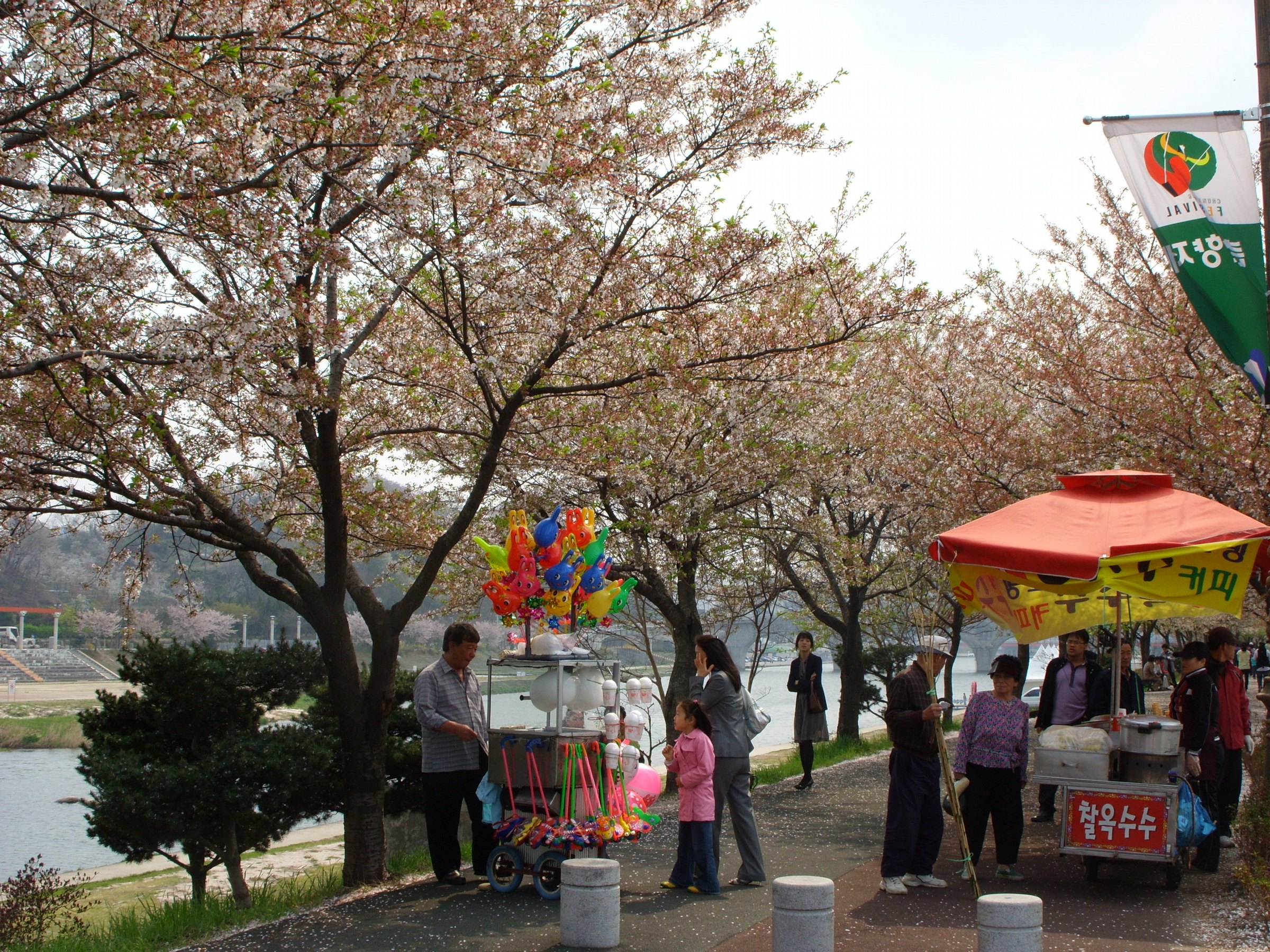
Yocheon River in spring (2008) - II

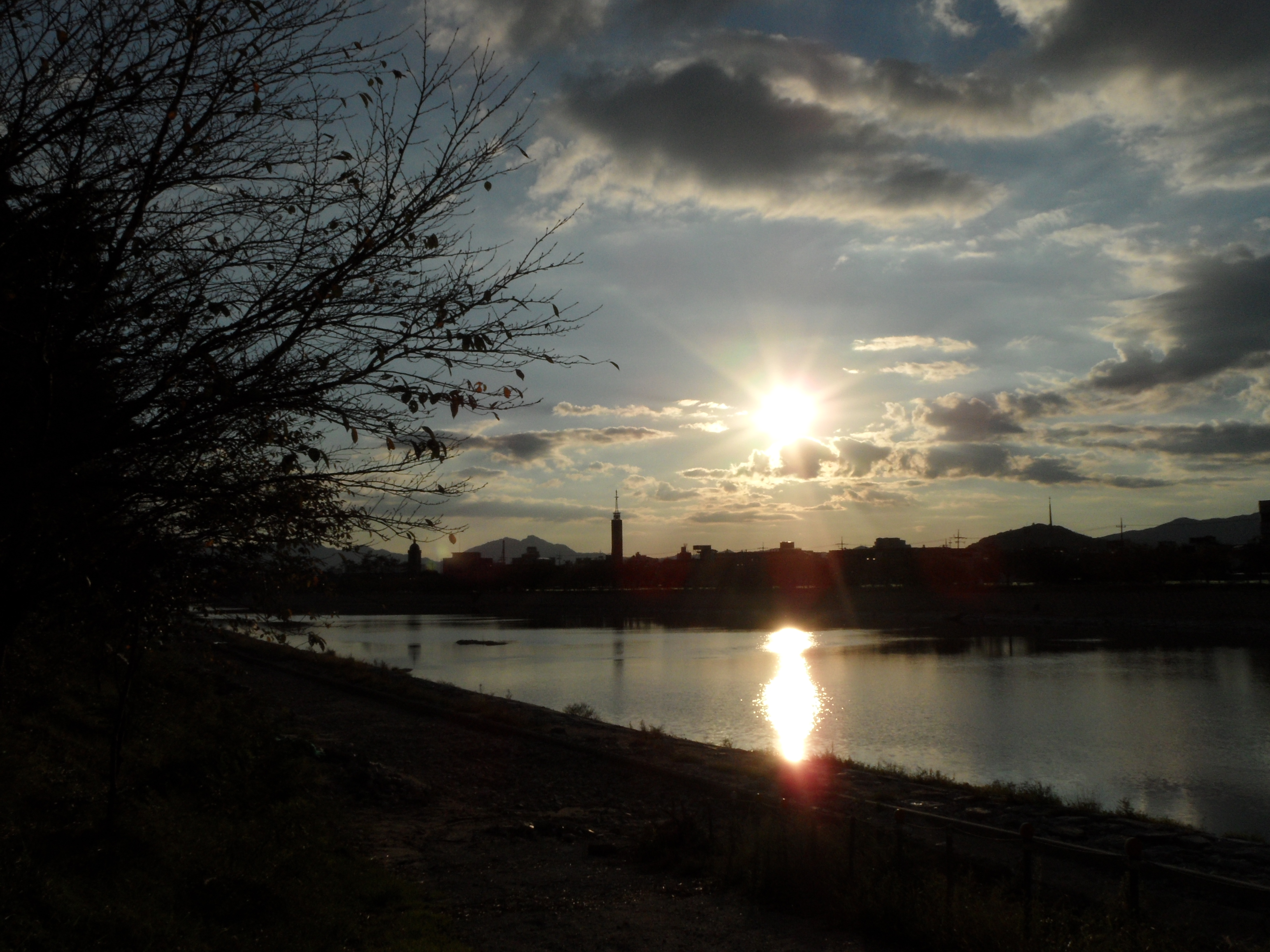
Namwon - along the Yocheon River (2010).

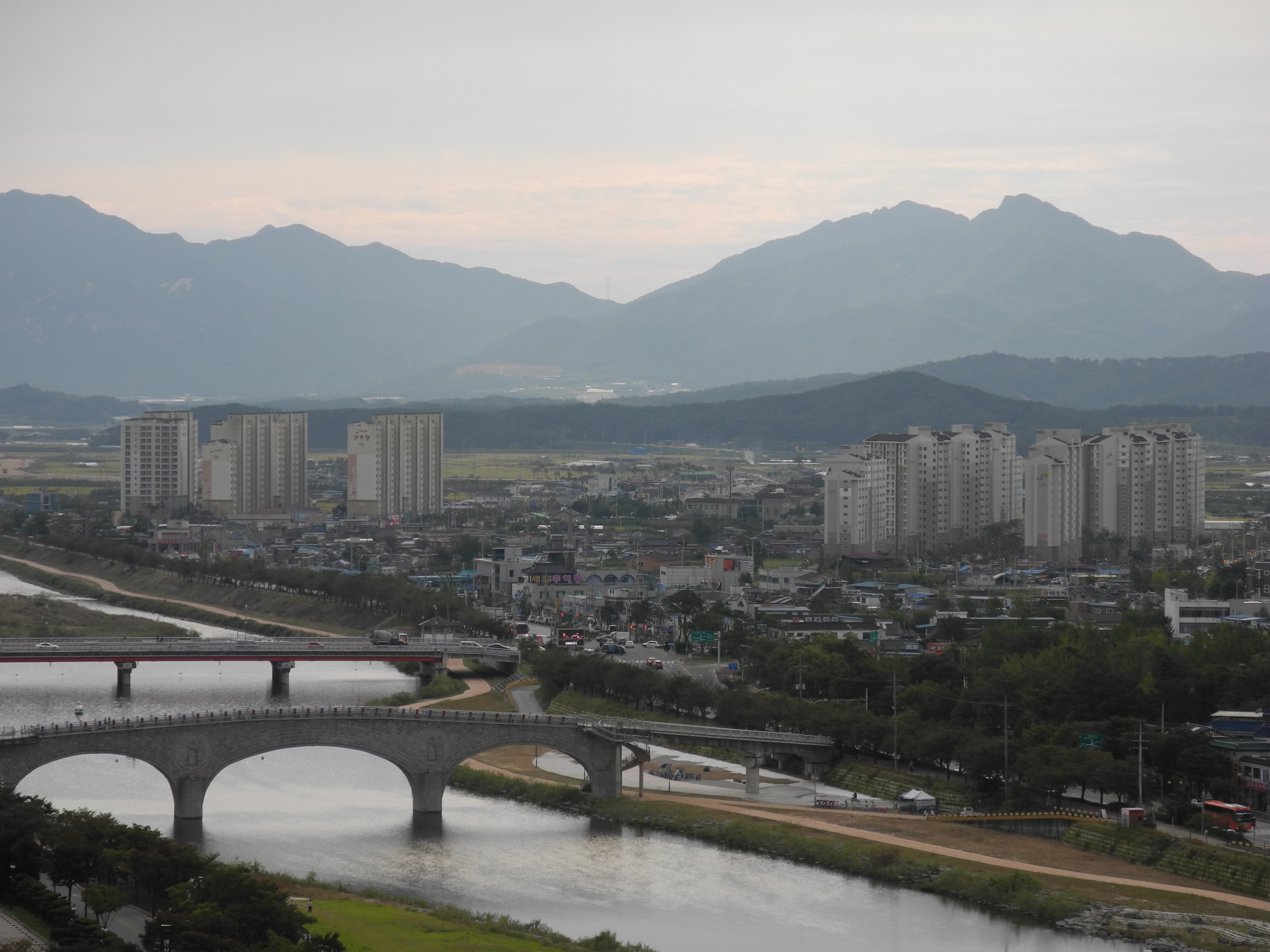
Namwon view of the Yocheon river from Agibong mountain - 2012.
