= Jangansan =

Mountain in South Korea

Coordinates: 35°37′48″N 127°35′45″E

Highest point
- Elevation: 1,237 m (4,058 ft)

Geography
- Location: North Jeolla Province, South Korea

Jangansan is a mountain of North Jeolla Province, western South Korea. It has an elevation of 1,237 metres.

== See also ==
- List of mountains of Korea
