= Geombongsan =

Mountain in Chuncheon, South Korea

Highest point
- Elevation: 530.2 m (1,740 ft)

Geography
- Location: South Korea

Korean name
- Hangul: 검봉산
- Hanja: 劍峰山
- RR: Geombongsan
- MR: Kŏmbongsan

Geombongsan (Korean: 검봉산) is a mountain in Chuncheon, Gangwon Province, South Korea. It has an elevation of 530.2 m (1,740 ft).

== See also ==
- List of mountains in Korea
