= Bonghwasan (Namsan-myeon, Chuncheon) =

Mountain in Chuncheon, South Korea

Highest point
- Elevation: 487 m (1,598 ft)

Geography
- Location: South Korea

Korean name
- Hangul: 봉화산
- Hanja: 烽火山
- RR: Bonghwasan
- MR: Ponghwasan

Bonghwasan (Korean: 봉화산) is a mountain near Chuncheon, Gangwon Province, South Korea. It has an elevation of 487 m (1,598 ft).

== See also ==
- List of mountains in Korea
