= Gyeongbong =

Korean Buddhist monk (1892–1982)

Gyeongbong (Korean: 경봉, Chinese: 鏡峰 1892–1982) was a Korean Buddhist monk, Ordained in 1907 at the age of 15, Master Gyeongbong was born in Milyang, Gyeongnam Province, in 1892. Master Gyeongbong was Abbot of Tongdo Temple in Yangsan, one of the most important Jogye Order temples in Korea. At Tongdo Temple, Master Gyeongbong became famous for the many monks he taught. After turning 90, Master Gyeongbong began to give dharma speeches, which more than one thousand people would regularly attend. In 1982, Master Gyeongbong wrote his last lecture, “Touch the Crossbar at Midnight,” and died.

== Biography ==
He learned the Four Books and three classics (a variational set of the Four Books and Five Classics) from Kang dal soo(姜達壽), a Korean scholar of Chinese literature in the city of Milyang. At the age of 15, he lost his mother and from 1907 he started the Pabbajjā, and he learned from Seonghae(聖海) in Tongdosa. In March 1908, he entered the Myongshin school(明新學校) that was built by Tongdosa, and in September of the same year he learned about the Ten Precepts upheld by sāmaṇeras from Cheong ho(淸湖). In 1912, he learned about the Upasampadā from Haedam(海曇) and learned about buddhist literature. After that, he indulged in Buddhist Meditation and traveled through different buddhist temples. While seeking for places to meditate. he was touched by the discussions about the zen with monk Manbong(萬峰) at Jikjisa in Gimcheon, which led to a three-month sitting meditation in geukrakam.

== See also ==
- Buddhism
- Mangong
- Seungsahn
- Jeongang
- Daewon
- Seoong
