= Daehaeng =

Korean Buddhist nun and Seon master

Daehaeng 대행 大行
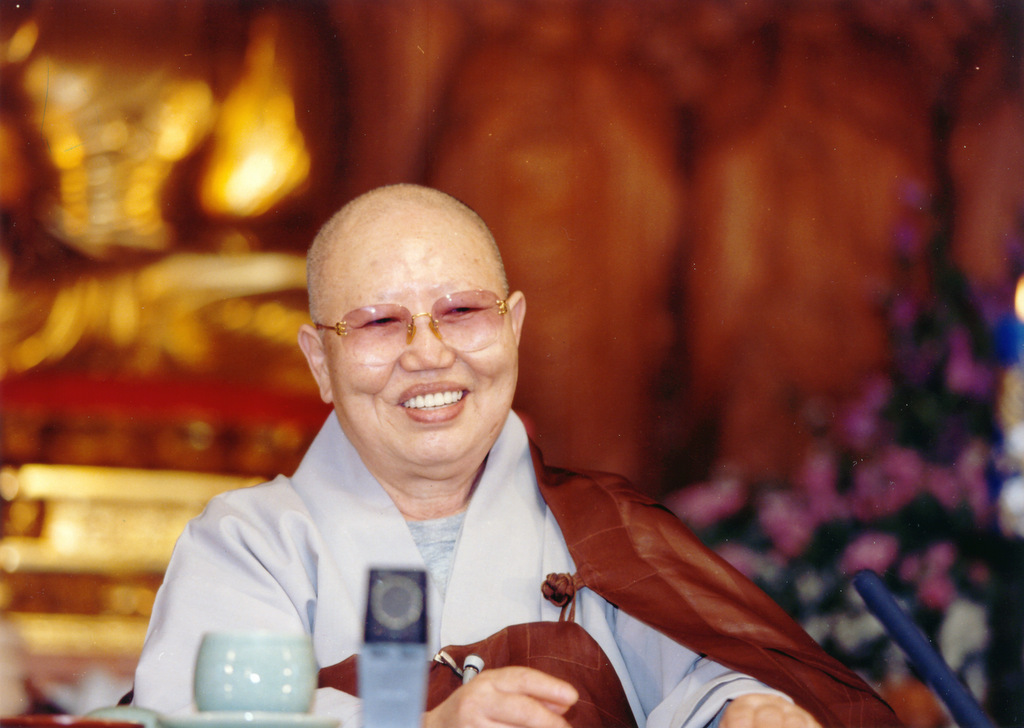
- Daehaeng Kun Sunim in 1996
- Title: Dae Seon Sa (Great Zen Master)

Personal life
- Born: Jum Soon No (노점순); February 3, 1927 Seoul, Korea
- Died: May 22, 2012 (age 85) Anyang, Seoul, South Korea
- Posthumous name: Myo Gong Dang (묘공당, 妙空堂)
- Website: www.hanmaum.org/eng

Religious life
- Religion: Buddhist
- School: Jogye Order of Korean Buddhism
- Dharma name: Daehaeng; Kun Sunim

Senior posting
- Teacher: Hanam Jungwon (漢巖 重遠)

Daehaeng Kun Sunim (Note: Korean: 대행 큰스님; Hanja: 大行僧; RR: Daehaeng Keunseunim) (1927–2012) was a Korean Buddhist nun and Seon (禪) master. She taught monks as well as nuns, and helped to increase the participation of young people in Korean Buddhism. She made laypeople a particular focus of her efforts, and broke out of traditional models of spiritual practice, teaching so that anyone could practice, regardless of monastic status or gender. She was also a major force for the advancement of Bhikkunis (nuns), heavily supporting traditional nuns’ colleges as well as the modern Bhikkuni Council of Korea. The temple she founded, Hanmaum Seon Center, grew to have 15 branches in Korea, with another 10 branches in other countries.

== Life ==
Daehaeng Kun Sunim was born in Seoul, Korea, in 1927. Her family was originally quite wealthy, and owned large pieces of land stretching from what is now Itaewon down to the Han River. Her father was from an old Korean military family, and had continued to secretly support resistance to the Japanese Occupation of Korea. As a result, in 1932 or 1933, the Japanese secret police, the Kempeitai, came to arrest him. He was warned a few minutes before their arrival and escaped out the back of his home with his family. They fled south across the Han River, and lived in the mountains there in a dugout hut. Unable to safely contact friends or family, they lived in poverty, having to glean fields for leftover grains of rice or vegetables.

During this time, Daehaeng Kun Sunim wandered the forest and often slept outdoors in order to avoid her increasingly angry and abusive father. After two years of extreme neglect and deprivation in the wilderness, her fear of sleeping alone in the mountains vanished one night when she awoke to a warm and comforting presence which she called appa, "daddy," taking this to be her true father and parent. Daehaeng would eventually identify this appa with buddha-nature, which she also described as one's inner juingong, or "master who is void".

Following the end of the second world war, Daehaeng had her head shaved as a postulant (Korean: haengja) by Hanam Kun Sunim at mount Odaesan. However, shunning the routine and formal practices of the monastery, she took to a life of intense meditation in neighboring forests, as in her youth. In 1950, Daehaeng formally ordained as a novice (Korean: samini), and after the death of Hanam Sunim, and having personally witnessed the chaos of the Korean War, she vowed to intensify her practice. She spent many of the years that followed wandering the mountains of Korea, wearing ragged clothes and eating only what was at hand. Though later, she explained that she hadn't been pursuing some type of asceticism or physical hardship; rather, she was just completely absorbed in entrusting everything to her fundamental Buddha-essence and observing how that affected her life.

Daehaeng experienced a series of awakenings during this period of extreme practice in the wilderness. In the last of these, she was surrounded by a vast brightness that extended in all directions, leaving her with an indescribable sense of fulfillment and comfort. After this awakening, Daehaeng experienced a permanent state of oneness with all things. She was said to have gained certain abilities as well, such as the power to speak with the dead and animals. At this time, Daehaeng also began experimenting with the power of mind to cure diseases, manifesting her first miracle when she reportedly cured a woman of an epileptic fit.

Around 1959, she settled in a hut below Sangwon Temple in the Chiak Mountains, and in 1961 she received full bhikṣuṇī ordination under a Ven. Ujin and the renowned scholar-monk Ven. Tanho, who were fellow students of Hanam Sunim. Throughout the sixties, she became well known for her powers as a healer, with purported cases of her having cured people of diseases including cancer, leukemia, polio, tuberculosis, as well as mental illness. However, Daehaeng was unlike traditional Korean shamans (mansin), as she attributed her powers to the "one mind" (hanmaum), or universal buddha-nature in all sentient beings. Receiving hundreds of visitors each day, she eventually began teaching people to rely on their own juingong within themselves.

In 1964, Daehaeng moved to the Wonju area to become more accessible to the public before again moving to Anyang, where in 1972 she established the Korean Buddhist Center (Daehan Bulgyo Hoegwan), which was later renamed the Hanmaum Seon Center (Hanmaum Seonwan). The early period of Daehaeng's teaching career was marked by strong iconoclasm. Echoing Zen masters of legend, she removed Buddha images from her organization's dharma halls and publicly burned introductory books on Buddhism. Later, when the Hanmaum Seon Center was officially registered with the Jogye Order, she enshrined a single statue of Buddha Śākyamuni. Also, in 1981, at the urging of Ven. Tanho, Daehaeng restored her bhikṣuṇī status, recovering her monastic registration with the order, which had been lost.

In 1984, she began giving public Dharma talks, becoming the first master in post-war Korea to popularize and make accessible Zen teachings among the laity. She eschewed formal ganhwa meditation, teaching instead a flexible and simple method of letting go and entrusting to juingong. For this, no cultivation was necessary. Rather, all that was required was faith in one's buddha-nature which is functioning throughout all one's daily life. At the time of her death on May 22, 2012, she was the guiding teacher of over one hundred nuns, and the Dharma teacher of over fifty monks. The center she founded has a lay membership of over one hundred fifty thousand people, and has grown to twenty five branches around the world.

Daehaeng has been compared to a pratyekabuddha, or solitary buddha, who "awakened herself through many years of ascetic practices rather than through teachers or going through formal Buddhist training." Kyungrae Kim and Cheonghwan Park also observe that Daehaeng never received dharma transmission, but rather bypassed "traditional routes of monastic training and mentorship," with the Hanmaum Seon Center presenting her as a solitary buddha "who attained enlightenment independently without the help of a teacher." In spite of the importance of dharma transmission within the Jogye Order, it has not questioned Daehaeng's lack of transmission, with Daehaeng receiving praise from senior members of the order's administration.

== Teachings ==
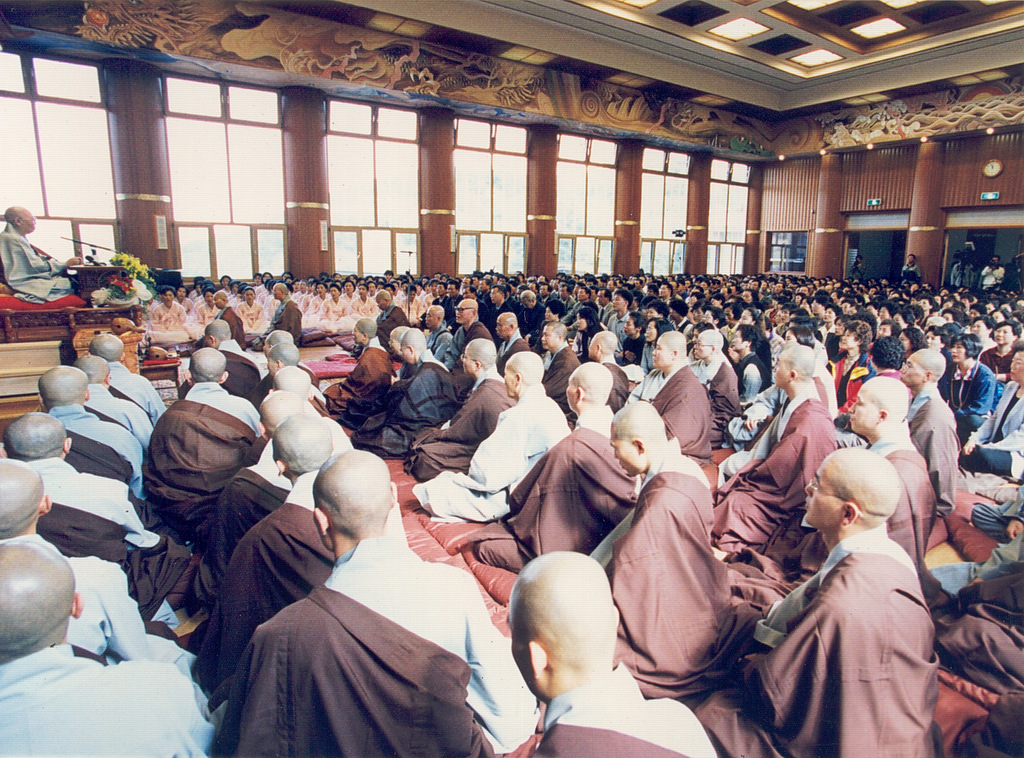
A Dharma talk by Daehaeng Kun Sunim at the Jinju, South Korea, Hanmaum Seon Center

=== Hanmaum ===
A core concept in Daehaeng's teaching is Hanmaum, or the "One Mind." Han means "one," "combined," or "infinite," while maum means "mind." Thus, for Daehaeng, Hanmaum refers to the infinite and combined interconnected whole, in which all lives and things function together as one. It can also be understood as the fundamental mind, which is intangible and invisible, without beginning or end. As such, Hanmaum transcends time and space. According to Daehaeng, the entire universe and all beings in it are embraced by Hanmaum. As she explains, since buddha-nature is one, all lives and minds are inherently one, even though they appear with different physical bodies, similar to the way in which many different light bulbs may all be lit up by a single electricity. As Daehaeng says, "Hanmaum connects all things as one, just as the same electricity brightens this light bulb and that one."

=== Juingong ===
Another central concept of Daehaeng's is Juingong, one's true foundation. According to Daehaeng's teaching, where one's body and thoughts are like branches and leaves, Juingong is their root. It is the essence upon which one's existence is based. Daehaeng explains Juingong as the true doer which sustains and takes care of everything. Doing everything, it is empty and lacks any fixed shape, while changing and manifesting ceaselessly. Juingong is also "Buddha," having bright wisdom, while guiding and leading all beings forward. Daehaeng likens Juingong to a vast furnace which can dissolve and transform all painful circumstances. As she explains, "Any kind of disaster or painful karma is just a snowflake in front of it." Juingong is the power of buddha-nature, possessed by each and every life.

In traditional Chan sources, Juingong (Ch. Zhurengong) is written 主人公 and means "master" or "owner." However, Daehaeng's Juingong replaces the last character with the character for emptiness, and is thus written 主人空 in order to emphasize the Mahāyāna notion of the emptiness of the Dharma realm (which is also paradoxically a fullness).

=== Faith ===
Daehaeng taught that one must be able to let go and entrust all things to Juingong. According to Daehaeng, this letting go and entrusting requires faith, for as she explains, "without faith, you can't let go." On the other hand, with faith, entrusting happens in an instant, leaving one without anything further to worry about. In this way, Daehaeng explained that faith is meditation. She likened belief in one's foundation to a tree's reliance upon its root. As she explained, "The only thing you need to do is believe in your root. Completely rely upon it. All those trees [pointing outside] live by relying upon their root. To ask them if they believe in their root is like asking a person if they have a head. Absurd."

=== Entrusting ===
Daehaeng taught that we should have faith and leave everything to our foundation, Juingong, without worrying about anything. She likened Juingong to a skillful servant that knows how to execute its tasks well. However, the more we try to intervene or meddle in its duties, the more it steps back, leaving us to rely on our own devices. So, instead, we should just entrust everything to Juingong and let go. This entrusting is not something we need to force. She said:

Thank you for working so hard. But you're trying too frantically to entrust. You don't need to force it. Your true nature is already with you. Everyone born into this world already has this foundation complete within them. You're here, so your foundation is also here. So just trust that and relax. And whether you're awake or asleep, sitting or standing, doing this or that, know this: "Ahh, Juingong, you're here; you're the one who's taking care of things." Just trust this foundation and turn everything over to it. This is entrusting. (Note: Similarly, Daehaeng taught: "Do not overstrain yourself trying to understand this principle. Believe that 'My daily life, as it is, is done by the foundation,' and let it go. Live while believing and entrusting. Do not try to understand 'What is entrusting it to Juingong?' by using your intellect. Just believe that 'Things that go well are from there, and things that go badly are also from there. Everything is done by that place, and can be solved by only that place.' This is letting go and entrusting it to Juingong." Daehaeng also said, "Leave the One Mind in charge. Take a vacation.")

=== Letting go ===
Daehaeng taught that letting go was the foundation of all spiritual practice. Accordingly, she exhorted people to work on letting go of thoughts such as "I," "mine," and "I did." Moreover, for Daehaeng, if we can let go unconditionally, we can "let go with mindless mind, without the thought of letting go." She explained that we should not get caught up in the thought, "I have to let go," since we are already naturally letting go of every moment.

She said, "we've already let go of everything. Life is changing instant by instant, with nothing to grasp on to. The very essence of life is letting go. When you met your son just a moment ago and said goodbye, the moment is already gone. It's been let go of. But even 'letting go' is just a name, a word, and a theory. Our living itself is just flowing, with nothing to cling to or let go of." Thus, Daehaeng taught that one must let go even of letting go itself:

Inherently, everybody is naturally going forward while letting go. In fact, there are no such things as holding or letting go. However, people think that something remains or that something really exists. Thus they are caught by such thoughts, so they cannot move as they want and they experience numerous hardships. This is why I say, "Let go, release." Let go and rest such that your mind feels comfortable. Let go again of even this comfort, and finally, let go of even letting go. Then, this is sitting Seon, true Seon, and Seon in daily life. (Note: Compare with Tōsui: "Ejō, let your wisdom and meditation be clearly illuminating And then and there you’ll let things go Let go! Let go even of letting go Then what will be left to let go of? Drink your tea, eat your rice Don’t go looking anywhere else Ejō, let your wisdom and meditation be clearly illuminating And the ten thousand things will all come to rest")

=== Doing without doing ===
Daehaeng also taught "doing without doing" (ham i ŏpsi handa). According to her view, the fundamental reality, or natural state, is a nondual whole in which everything functions together as one. As such, no separate doer exists, since everything is "happening naturally, without a conscious effort on the part of the individual." In terms of a method of spiritual cultivation, "doing without doing" entails letting go of the thought of the individual as a separate doer. For Daehaeng, this requires faith in one's foundation, or fundamental mind, which is connected to all phenomena and functions together with them in a nondual way. As one knows that this foundation is doing all things, one entrusts everything to it with the faith that it is taking care of whatever arises in one's life. Thus, one is able to let go naturally and automatically.

=== Observing ===
Another important aspect of Daehaeng's teaching is observing, gwan 觀. This refers to observing the entire process of practice and the way in which one's foundation resolves whatever is entrusted. Gwan has the sense of a kind of "bird's-eye view," of viewing from a higher level without discrimination or attachment.

Pori Park comments that gwan "is close to vipaśyanā meditation in that it emphasises awareness, not being swept away by the currents of life. It differs, however, by entrusting everything to the foundation, Juingong, which is akin to the Sŏn emphasis on the Buddha nature that directly functions in our daily lives." Daehaeng explains that observing does not refer to watching some object, but is rather being firmly centered and aware. As she states, "Observing means watching the center that has no fixed shape and never stands still." She explains that, in this, there is no separation between the one who watches and what is watched.

=== Self-reliant practice ===
"Have faith in your inherent Buddha-nature, unconditionally entrust it with the things that come up in your life, and go forward. Observe what happens when you entrust problems and feelings to your inherent nature -- experiment with this, and try to apply what you learn. And then go forward without clinging to even that."

The goal of Daehaeng Kun Sunim's teachings was to help people to discover the great potential within themselves. In this way, they would be able to make their own way forward, and use the abilities inherent within them to help themselves and others. To this end, she taught people to rely upon the great wisdom and energy inherent within each of us, often called "Buddha-nature," through which she said each one of us is connected to every other being and thing.

In her own life and practice, Daehaeng Kun Sunim had experienced for herself that each and every person has this infinite potential of Buddha-nature within themselves, which she said could be called "the owner of mind," "ordinary mind," "the pillar of mind," "inherent nature," "God," "inherent Buddha," "Father," and so on. She was determined to teach such that spiritual practice was something everyone could participate in, and which wasn't limited to certain groups such as monks or nuns.

It was important to her that people develop the strengths and tools to be able to practice and overcome whatever might confront them, without becoming dependent upon some outer teacher or guru. To this end, she taught people to rely directly upon this "inherent Buddha." She also frequently used the Korean expressions for "foundation," "fundamental mind," "Juingong" (the empty doer that is truly doing things), and "Hanmaum" (one mind). While she did say that a good teacher was valuable, nonetheless, as Pori Park points out:

She advised that people should not be deceived by anyone, including her, and instead they should strive to find Juingong. She warned followers that they should be wary of her physical form but have faith in the truth that she taught. She advised them not to blindly follow her or the Buddha but just to take refuge in their own Buddha, Juingong. She also told them not to make her their teacher but to make themselves, the true Juingong, their own teachers.

As Daehaeng herself said, "I encourage you to trust in your own Ju In Gong completely. Just remember that the Ju In Gong is within you all the time. There is no need to try to analyze or quantify it. Just return all conditions to it. If you are earnest in your effort you will not need me or anyone else to teach you."

=== Attitude toward traditional practices ===
Daehaeng didn't emphasize fixed periods of sitting meditation, nor did she encourage the systematic study of hwadus (the "critical phrases" within koan stories). Rather, she wanted people to get used to listening inwardly and discovering what they needed to do at any particular time to brighten their own hearts, as opposed to getting caught up in others' fixed forms and traditions. To this extent, she taught people to take the issues of their own daily life as the material of their spiritual practice, and to practice entrusting that to one's inherent Buddha-nature.

Regarding hwadus, or questions used in Zen meditation, Daehaeng held that although they can still be effective, they don't work as well with modern people, and at any rate, each person has their own fundamental hwadus that they were born with. "Why am I here?" "What am I supposed to be doing with my life?" and so on. As such, she taught that it was not necessary to receive a hwadu from others since everyone already has their own "original hwadus." She said:

Daily life is itself a hwadu, so there is no need to receive a hwadu from others or to give a hwadu to others. Your very existence is a hwadu. Thus, if you are continuously holding on to a hwadu someone else gave you, when will you be able to solve your original hwadu? Trying to solve another person's hwadu is like turning empty millstones or spinning a car's wheels without moving forward. Your body itself is a hwadu. Birth itself is a hwadu. Work itself is a hwadu. The vast universe is a hwadu. If you want to add more hwadus to these, when will you be able to taste this infinitely deep world we live in?

=== Not blaming others ===
Daehaeng also taught that we should be careful to interpret events positively and warned about getting caught up in blaming others for the things one experiences. Instead, we should understand that we've had a role in creating everything that we experience. So if we can handle things wisely, if we can entrust them to our foundation, those will change and move in a more positive direction.

== Modern adaptations of traditional ceremonies and sutras ==
In the late 1970s, Daehaeng Kun Sunim began translating traditional ceremonies and sutras used in Korean Buddhist temples into modern Korean. She had been concerned that laypeople were missing the benefits and help that understanding the ceremonies could provide, and so began translating the traditional Chinese written scriptures into modern, phonetic Korean (Hangul). However, Daehaeng did not translate literally, but rather reinterpreted the texts in line with her teachings, through liberal translations. For example, where the traditional version of the Heart Sutra expresses emptiness as its main doctrine, Daehaeng's version emphasizes the One Mind as the foundation of all things, and treats emptiness as phenomena's flexible nature which manifests moment by moment without interruption.

Similarly, where the Thousand Hands Sutra traditionally contained prayers of penance directed toward outer powers, such as multiple buddhas and the bodhisattva of mercy, Daehaeng's version highlights the One Mind which is not separate from the minds of all buddhas and bodhisattvas. By shifting the focus onto the One Mind, absent in the original sutra, Daehaeng's text redirects the practitioner inward: "The foundation of the Earth is my one mind, / The foundation of the sun is my one mind, / How could something not be taken care of by my mind? / The source of the entire universe is my one mind. / It guides every single thing in this interconnected world."

In a similar fashion, rather than chanting "adoration to Śākyamuni Buddha (namu Sŏgamonibul)" or "adoration to the Bodhisattva of Mercy (namu Kwanseŭm posal)," which are popular chants at other temples, the Hanmaum Seon Center chants "adoration to the original Buddha within each person (namu Chasŏng pollaebul)."

Daehaeng's adaptations of traditional Buddhist texts include:

- The Thousand Hands Sutra (千手經), which includes the Great Compassion Dharani (大悲咒)
- The Heart Sutra (般若心經)
- The Diamond Sutra (金剛經)

In addition, she translated a large portion of the Flower Ornament Sutra (華嚴經). Her Korean version of the Thousand Hands Sutra with the Great Compassion Dharani has been published in English as A Thousand Hands of Compassion. Daehaeng's Diamond Sutra has also been translated into English as The Great Unfolding.

== Hanmaum Seon Center ==
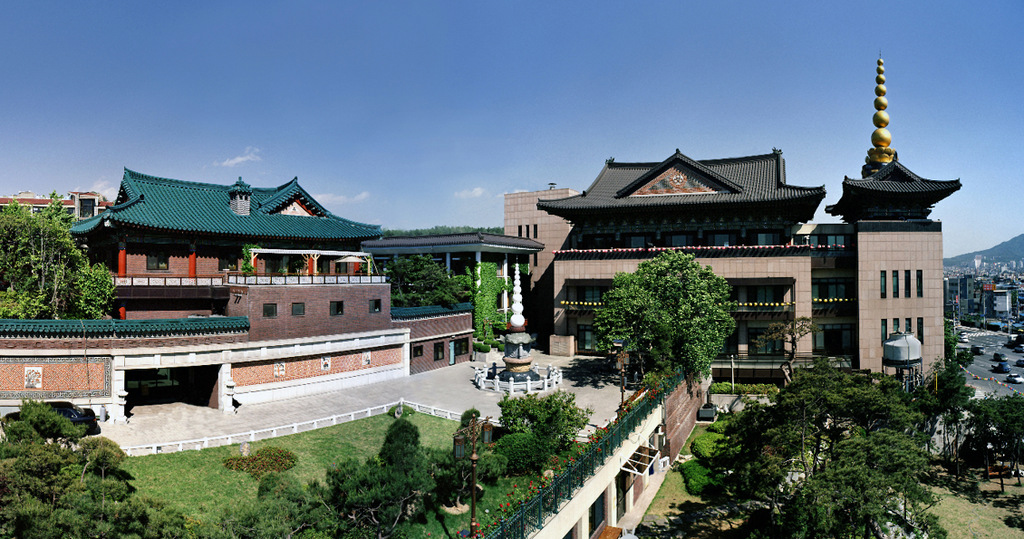
Hanmaum Seon Center("Hanmaum Seonwon"), Anyang, South Korea,

Hanmaum Seon Center (or Hanmaum Seonwon-한마음 선원) is a large Buddhist temple complex near Seoul, South Korea. Founded in 1972, in Anyang City, it is part of the Jogye Order of Korean Buddhism. It is run by Daehaeng Kun Sunim's Bhikkuni disciples, and has fifteen Korean branches and ten overseas branches. In addition to its role as a center for teaching the Dharma, it is well known for its choir and youth groups. The youth group is the driving force behind many award-winning lanterns and floats that take part in the Buddha's Birthday parades.

== Works in English ==
Primary Works

- In Search of the Genuine "I": The Korean Buddhist Teachings and Sayings of Tae-Heng Se Nim (Lotus Flower Publishing Company, 1989)
- Teachings of the Heart (by Tae Heng Se Nim, 1990, Dai Shin Press)
- The Inner Path of Freedom: The Teachings of Seon Master Dae Haeng Sunim (1999, HanMaUm Seon Center)
- Who is Healing? (in Martine Batchelor, Women on the Buddhist Path, 2002, pages 183-187, Thorsons, originally published as Walking on Lotus Flowers, 1996, Thorsons)
- It's Hard to Say: Buddhist Stories Told by Seon Master Daehaeng (2005, Hanmaum Seonwon)
- No River to Cross: Trusting the enlightenment that's always right here (2007, Wisdom Publications)
- A Thousand Hands of Compassion: The chant of Korean spirituality and enlightenment (2008, Korean/English, Hanmaum Publications)
- Find the Treasure Within (2002, 2011, Hanmaum Seonwon Foundation)
- My Heart is a Golden Buddha: Buddhist Stories from Korea (2012, Hanmaum Publications)
- Wake Up and Laugh: The Dharma teachings of Zen Master Daehaeng (2014, Wisdom Publications)
- Touching the Earth: the Power of Our Inner Light to Transform the World (2015, Hanmaum Seonwon Foundation)
- One Mind: Principles (2016, Hanmaum Seonwon Foundation)
- Sharing the Same Heart: Parents, Children, and Our Inherent Essence (2017, Hanmaum Seonwon Foundation)
- Standing Again: Healing, Health, and Our Inner Light (2019, Hanmaum Seonwon Foundation)
- Like Lions Learning to Roar (2020, Hanmaum Seonwon Foundation)
- The Diamond Sutra: The Great Unfolding (2025, Hanmaum Seonwon Foundation)
- Carving My Own Buddha: Resting, Recovering, and Growing (2026, Hanmaum Seonwon Foundation)

Secondary Works

- Master Daehaeng's Teachings on Spiritual Practice, by Hyeseon Sunim (2004), in 2004 International Conference: Korean Nuns within the Context of East Asian Buddhist Traditions, Vol. 2 English, pages 107-137, Hanmaum Seonwon
- A Brief Imaginative History of the Birth and Conception of Master Daehaeng's Juingong, by Marcie Middlebrooks, in 2004 International Conference: Korean Nuns within the Context of East Asian Buddhist Traditions, Vol. 2 English, pages 419-437, Hanmaum Seonwon
- Educating Unborn Children: A Sŏn Master's Teachings on T'aegyo, by Chong Go (2006), in Religions of Korea in Practice, Buswell, Robert (ed.), pages144-160, Princeton University Press
- Forum on the Thousand Hands Sutra: Frankfurt Bookfair 2009, (2009, English/German, Hanmaum International Culture Institute)
- Sŏn Master Daehaeng's ‘Doing without Doing’, by Chong Go (2010), in Makers of Modern Korean Buddhism, Park, Jin Young, (ed). SUNY Press, pages 227-242.
- Pori Park (2017) Uplifting Spiritual Cultivation for Lay People: Bhikṣuṇī Master Daehaeng (1927–2012) of the Hanmaum Seonwon (One Mind Sŏn Center) in South Korea, in Contemporary Buddhism: An Interdisciplinary Journal

== Works in Korean ==
Principal works

- 신행요전 Hanmaum Seonwon, 1987 (Ceremonies and Essentials)
- 한마음요전 Hanmaum Seonwon, 1993, (The Principles of Hanmaum[One Mind])
- 허공을 걷는 길, V. 1-15 Hanmaum Seonwon, 2005~, (Stepping Forward into Emptiness: The collected Dharma Talks of Daehaeng Sunim)

Major secondary works

- 道 : 김정빈長篇實名小說 by Kim Jeong Bin, Kŭlsure, 1985, (The Way: A story of finding the Path, by Kim Jeong Bin)
- 한마음 : 大行스님對談集, by Che-yŏl Yi, Kŭlsure, 1988 (One Mind: Conversations with Daehaeng Sunim)
- 無 : 大行스님法語集 by Kim Jeong Bin, Kŭlsure, 1991 (Nothing: The Dharma Teachings of Daehaeng Sunim)
- 한마음과 대행禪 edited by Hye Seon, Unjusa, 2013 (One Mind and Daehaeng's Seon)

== See also ==
- Korean Buddhism
- Korean Seon
