= Mangong =

Korean Buddhist monk (1871–1946)

Mangong 만공 滿空
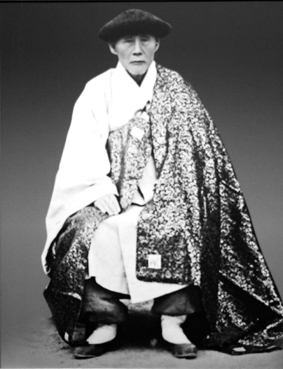
- Mangong, circa 1940
- Title: Zen Master

Personal life
- Born: Joseon

Religious life
- Religion: Buddhism
- School: Seon Buddhism

Mangong (Korean: 만공; Hanja: 滿空, 1871–1946) or Song Mangong was a Korean Buddhist monk, independence activist, scholar, poet, writer, and philosopher during the Japanese occupation of Korea. Mangong was born in Jeongeup, Jeonbuk Province in 1871 and was ordained at the age of 14. Though he spent three years teaching Zen tradition in Mahayeon Temple in Keumkang Mountain and briefly served as the abbot of Magok Temple, he spent most of his life teaching Zen at Deoksung Mountain in Yesan, Chungnam Province. Mangong revitalized the Zen tradition of Korean Buddhism along with his teacher, Zen Master Kyongho.

== See also ==
- Korean Buddhism
- Korean Seon
- Kyongho
- Hanam Jungwon
- Jeongang
- Daewon
- Seungsahn
- Jinje
- Han Yong-un
- Chunseong

== Gallery ==
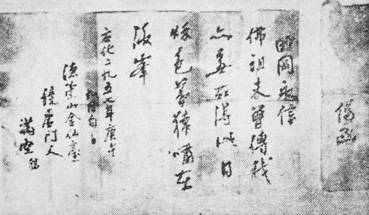
Letter of Mangong (1930)

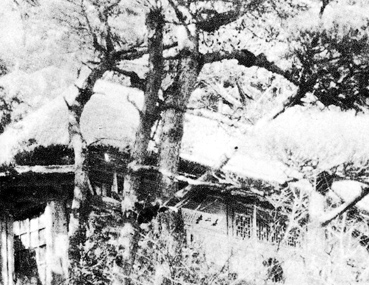
Temple of Junwol, 1941

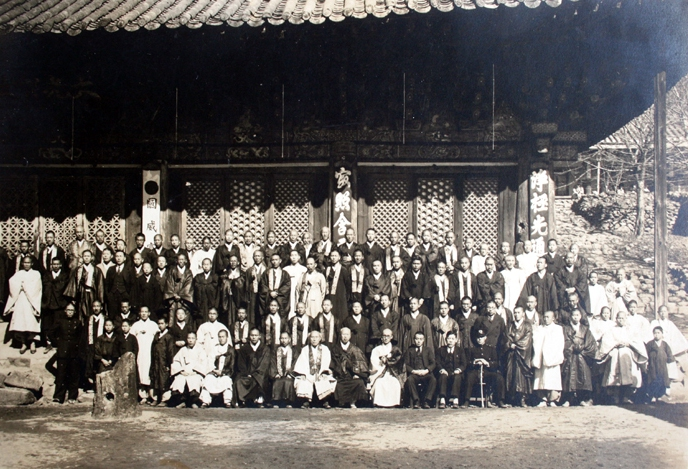
Temple magoksa of monks (1930)

== Web site ==
- http://www.ibulgyo.com/news/articleView.html?idxno=63691
- http://www.ibulgyo.com/news/articleView.html?idxno=84271
- http://www.ibulgyo.com/news/articleView.html?idxno=85495
- http://www.ibulgyo.com/news/articleView.html?idxno=90104
