= Wisdom without a teacher =

Zen Buddhist term

Wisdom without a teacher (Chinese: 無師智, pinyin: wúshīzhì; Japanese: 無師独悟, mushi-dokugo, Skt. anācāryaka jñāna), sometimes also called "self-enlightened and self-certified," or jigo-jishō (自悟自証) in Japanese, is a term used in Zen Buddhism to refer to the experience of a Zen practitioner reaching enlightenment (bodhi) or kensho without the aid of a master or teacher.

The idea of wisdom without a teacher is often considered suspect among various Zen schools, like in the modern Japanese Sōtō school. William Bodiford writes that since the risk of self-delusion is high, it is common for Zen disciples to rely on their teacher to "authenticate and formally acknowledge" their enlightenment experience. In spite of this, there have been Zen masters throughout history who have claimed to have awakened without the aid of a teacher and to not have required a teacher to confirm their awakening. This phenomenon is often related to criticisms of Zen institutions, especially the institutions of dharma transmission and transmission certificates.

== Etymology ==
Mushi-dokugo (無師独悟) is a Japanese term composed of four Chinese characters, or kanji, meaning "independent realization without a master." The character mu (無) means "without" or "no", shi (師) means "master" or "teacher", doku (独) means "independent" or "alone", and go (悟) means "realization" or "understanding" (satoru), also translated as "enlightenment" (satori). When strung together, the characters literally read, "no (無) master (師) independent (独) understanding (悟)." The equivalent Chinese pronunciation is wúshī dúwù.

== Indian sources ==
The idea that the Buddha awakened by himself without a teacher is found in the Early Buddhist texts. In the Ariyapariyesanā Sutta, the Buddha describes himself as being without peer. When asked about his teacher, he explains, "I have no teacher (Na me ācariyo atthi), and one like me can't be found," going on to state, "I, alone, am rightly self-awakened."

The idea of teacherless wisdom appears in Mahāyāna sources as well. A Sanskrit term which indicates a kind of jñāna (knowledge) "without an āchārya" (anācāryaka) appears in the Lotus sutra. The term anācāryaka jñāna (wisdom without a teacher) can be found in the sutra's section on the parable of the burning house, in connection with both the pratyekabuddha and bodhisattva paths. Regarding the bodhisattva vehicle, the sutra states:

There are other people, who, desiring the wisdom of the Omniscient One (sarvajña-jñāna), the wisdom of the buddhas (buddha-jñāna), the wisdom of the Self-generated One (svayaṃbhu-jñāna), wisdom without a teacher (anācāryaka jñāna), apply themselves to the teaching of the Tathāgata in order to understand the wisdom, powers and confidence of the Tathāgata (tathāgata-jñāna-bala vaiśāradya), for the sake of the welfare and happiness of many people, out of compassion for the world, for the benefit, welfare and happiness of many people, both gods and men, for the sake of the parinirvāṇa of all beings. They are said to be those who, desiring the great vehicle (mahāyāna; tathāgatayāna), escape from the threefold world. Therefore, they are called bodhisattva-mahāsattvas.

John McRae observes that the phrase "natural wisdom and teacherless wisdom" occurs in the Wisdom Sūtra of Heavenly King Pravara as well, where it also refers to the wisdom sought after by bodhisattvas. However, according to McRae, the point of sutras such as the Lotus and Pravara is that "natural wisdom and teacherless wisdom" is a state that bodhisattvas wish to attain, but is otherwise not a fundamental endowment of sentient beings. McRae contrasts this with the interpretation of Shenhui, who appealed to such sutras in support of his view that "natural wisdom and teacherless wisdom" constitutes a kind of Buddhist naturalness (ziran), identifying this with the "fundamental nature of sentient beings." (Note: Although Shenhui held that "Sentient beings fundamentally possess 'the teacherless wisdom, the natural wisdom,'" he also explained that buddha-nature is covered over by afflictions, like gold and gangue existing simultaneously. He compared the teaching of a spiritual compatriot by which one becomes enlightened to the refining activity of a goldsmith. He said, "If you do not encounter a true spiritual compatriot, then you will create the various [types of] evil karma and will not be able to escape saṃsāra, and therefore you will not be able to achieve buddhahood.")

Reference to the Buddha's awakening without a teacher can be found in the Gaganagañjaparipṛccha, which states, "The Lord, having awakened through his own power (svayaṃbhū), entered into the state of perfect awakening (abhisaṃbuddha) by himself (svayam) to all moments of existence without a teacher (anācāryakam)." Likewise, the term "anācāryaka" also appears in the Ratnagotravibhāga, in which it is listed as a quality of the wisdom (jñāna) of the Buddha's attainment of Buddhahood. The Buddha is described as having "perfectly cognized its [Buddhahood's] unutterable nature by one-self (svayam), i.e. by means of self-born knowledge which needs no teacher." The same text also explains how the Buddha's awakening is "not dependent on others" (aparapratyayabhisambodhi), "because it is realized through one's innate knowledge." Similarly, the Avataṃsaka Sūtra states, "This wisdom transcends illusion, giving rise to the wisdom that is all-knowing, the wisdom that has no teacher, and the wisdom without obstructions."

A parallel term is the self- or masterless ordination (svāmaṃ/svayambhūtva or anācāryaka upasampadā) in which a Buddhist monk ordains himself without a quorum of monks. The idea is found in Vasubandhu's Abhidharmakoṣabhāṣya with reference to the Vinaya (monastic rule). (Note: As an example of self-ordination in Chan, see the Lidai fabao ji, in which Liaojianxing, a female disciple of Baotang Wuzhu, tonsured herself and went on to become "a leader among nuns." Regarding this, Wendi Adamek comments: "In the Lidai fabao ji, a female practitioner tonsures herself and becomes a nun, functioning as the preceptor, the essence of the precepts, and the audience-recipient all in one." According to Adamek, the account in the Lidai fabao ji of Wuzhu's female disciples, including Liaojianxing, is "the earliest portrayal of Chan nuns in a known practice community.") The term can also refer to taking the bodhisattva vow by oneself, an act which is discussed in the Śrīmālādevisiṃhanāda sūtra and in the Bodhisattvabhūmi.

== In Chinese Chan ==
=== Proto- and Early Chan sources ===
According to McRae, no known lineage theory existed during the period of Chan history retrospectively designated "proto-Chan," and it is not clear that the practitioners participating in it saw themselves as belonging to a unified movement or group. The proto-Chan source known as the Long Scroll (referred to as the "Bodhidharma Anthology" by Jeffrey Broughton), which contains the earliest known records of Chan, has the iconoclastic Master Yüan state, "If you do not seek the marvellous understanding, and do not take someone as a teacher, and do not take the Dharma as a teacher, one will naturally advance alone." Regarding the teaching of Master Yüan, Broughton writes:

He [Yüan] is iconoclastic, consistently criticizing reliance on the Dharma, reliance on teachers, reliance on meditative practice, reliance on canonical texts. Faith in Buddhist teachings and teachers, praxis according to the traditional rules, and learning in scripture lead to nothing but self-deception and confusion. From this stance Master Yüan never budges. His relentless boldness prefigures much in the stance of the full-blown Ch'an tradition.

Early Chan sources acknowledge the possibility of advancing without a teacher as well. For example, the Xuemai lun 血脈論 (Bloodstream Sermon), a text attributed to Bodhidharma though probably a product of the Oxhead School, while arguing that teacherless enlightenment is rare, nonetheless concedes, "If, though, by the conjunction of conditions, someone understands what the Buddha meant, that person doesn't need a teacher. Such a person has a natural awareness superior to anything taught." Similarly, in the Lengqie shizi ji 楞伽師資記 (Records of the Masters and Disciples of the Laṅkāvatāra), after explaining how one can understand the nature of things so that the mind becomes luminous and clear, Daoxin goes on to state, "This can be brought about by somebody teaching you, or you may attain liberation without ever having to be taught." (Note: The full quotation from the Lengqie shizi ji is as follows: "Others asked: ‘How can we truly understand the nature of things so that the mind becomes luminous and clear?’ Daoxin said – Don’t be mindful of the Buddha; Don’t control the mind; Don’t examine the mind; Don’t speculate about the mind; Don’t deliberate; Don’t practise analysis; Don’t become distracted; Just let it be. Don’t try to get rid of it, Don’t try to make it stay. In solitude and peace, the mind will of itself become luminous and clear. If you can carefully observe the mind in this way, the mind will become luminous and clear, like a bright mirror. If you do this for one year, the mind will be even more luminous and clear. If you do this for three to five years, the mind will be yet more luminous and clear. This can be brought about by somebody teaching you, or you may attain liberation without ever having to be taught.")

A famous story of the early Chan tradition is that of the sixth patriarch Huineng who, without any prior training or instruction, is said to have experienced awakening at a chance hearing of someone chanting the Diamond Sutra. The Platform Sutra of the Sixth Patriarch contains several references to self-awakening. For example, in chapter one Huineng says, "When one is deluded, one thinks teachers take [sentient beings over to the other shore], but when one is enlightened, one realizes one crosses over by oneself." And in chapter two, Huineng states:

Those who realize on their own do not need to seek outside. If you insist absolutely that a teacher is necessary in order to attain liberation, that is not right. Why? Because there is a teacher within one's own mind that understands spontaneously.

Chapter seven of the Taishō edition of the Platform Sutra contains a dialogue in which Huineng's disciple Xuance asks Yongjia Xuanjue, "From whom did you attain the Dharma?" Yongjia explains that he was awakened from his reading of the Vimalakīrti Sūtra. To this, Xuance replies that enlightenment by oneself without a teacher was the "heretical path of naturalism." However, as Morten Schlütter points out, this Yongjia episode was incorporated into the longer Platform Sutra from a later source, the Liandeng huiyao, a text written by Huiweng Wuming in 1183. On the other hand, Huineng's teaching that one who is able to self-awaken need not depend on an external teacher can be found in the Dunhuang version of the Platform Sutra, the earliest extant version of the text. (Note: The passage in question reads: "...if you awaken by yourself, do not rely on teachers outside. If you try to seek a teacher outside and hope to obtain deliverance, you will find it impossible. If you have recognized the good teacher within your own mind, you have already obtained deliverance. If you are deluded in your own mind and harbor erroneous thoughts and contrary concepts, even though you go to an outside teacher [you will not be able to obtain salvation]. If you are not able to obtain self-awakening, you must give rise to prajñā and illuminate with it, and then in one instant false thoughts will be destroyed. Once you have awakened to the fact that you yourself are your own true good teacher, in one awakening you will know the Buddha." The idea that one has a teacher within one's own mind can also be found in the Xiuxin yao lun of Hongren: "Question: Why do you call the mind the fundamental teacher? Answer: The True Mind exists of itself and does not come from outside [oneself. As teacher] it does not even require any tuition fee! [...] Therefore, it is known that the Buddhas of the three periods of time take their own True Mind as teacher. [...] Therefore, it is known that the mind is the fundamental teacher.")

=== Middle Chan ===
Middle Chan sources express nuanced views regarding the role of teachers. In the teachings of the Hongzhou master Baizhang Huaihai contained in the Baizhang guanglu, alongside the recommendation to call on good teachers, one finds, "foremost of all, you must have eyes yourself." In a negative statement regarding teachers, Baizhang says, "When you call on teachers and seek some knowledge or understanding, this is the demon of teachers, because it gives rise to verbalization and opinion."

Baizhang's student Huangbo Xiyun explained that people of sharp abilities do not seek from others. According to Huangbo, "investigating Chan and studying the Way" were just words to entice people of dull spiritual faculties. When Huangbo's student Pei Xiu inquired about which Dharma is taught to people of the highest faculties, Huangbo answered, "If they are people of superior spiritual faculties, then where would they be looking for someone to follow?" The modern Korean commentator Seon Master Subul connects this passage from Huangbo's Chuanxin fayao with "awakening on one's own without a teacher" (wushi ziwu/musa ja-o 無師自悟).

The iconoclastic Linji Yixuan is said to have rejected his master Huangbo's certification. He also advised his audience, "Followers of the Way, don't let just any old teacher put his stamp of approval on your face," going on to mock as "blind idiots" those who showed deference to teachers. Linji insisted that Chan practitioners must be non-dependent, "leaning on nothing." He explained to his listeners that instead of hurrying around in search of buddhas, patriarchs, and good teachers, they should turn their own light in upon themselves. (Note: Though elsewhere Linji says, "You should be searching for a good teacher! Don’t just drift along pursuing comfort.") The Japanese commentator on the Linji lu, Kensō Chitetsu (?–1687), identifies Linji's teaching of "solitary brightness" (孤明; gū míng) with "the ārya knowledge of awakening on one's own."

=== Song dynasty Chan ===
Critical attitudes towards dependence on teachers can be found in materials from the Song dynasty. The Song master Foyan Qingyuan (1067–1120), while at times recommending association with good companions and teachers, also emphasized independence and autonomy in his teachings. According to Cleary, Foyan "made no attempt to recruit disciples," wishing instead for people to be able to stand on their own feet. For example, Foyan said, "What do you go to a 'Zen center' for? You should make a living on your own, and not listen to what others say." Foyan was critical of over-reliance on teachers, as can be seen in the following story told by Foyan:

The second ancestor of Zen used to give talks wherever he happened to be, and all who heard him attained true awareness. He didn't establish any slogans or talk about causes and effects of practice and realization. In his time there was a certain meditation teacher who sent a top disciple to listen in on the Zen ancestor. The disciple never came back. The meditation teacher was furious, and took the occasion of a congress to upbraid his former disciple for disloyalty. The former disciple said, "My perception was originally true, but it was distorted by a teacher." Later someone asked a Zen master, "Where is my power of perception?" The Zen master said, "It is not obtained from a teacher." This is the way to attain Zen. An ancient said, "The Way is always with people, but people themselves chase after things."

=== Ming dynasty Chan ===
Stuart Lachs observes that a range of views existed during the Ming dynasty regarding dharma transmission. Some maintained that dharma transmission should be granted to disciples who were not enlightened but were nonetheless capable of managing temple affairs, a practice referred to as the "seal of the winter melon." On the other hand, the Caodong master Wuyi Yuanlai (1575–1630) was critical of giving dharma transmission merely to perpetuate Chan institutions, describing it as "adding water to dilute the milk." The view of Wuyi was that by his time all Chan lineages had been cut off. However, he felt that if one's awakening and understanding matched that of the previous Chan schools, those schools could still be considered alive. For Wuyi, the essence of the Chan school was thus in the matching of enlightened minds, rather than in formal transmission. As such, Wuyi felt having insight without formal transmission was preferable to having transmission without insight, as the former does no harm to the Dharma, while the latter deceives the Buddha, the world, and oneself.

A common view in the Ming was that since enlightenment is in the mind, if one was without any doubts about one's awakening, one did not have to seek confirmation from another. (Note: Early Buddhist texts also hold that with liberation comes knowledge of liberation. One who is free knows it for oneself. For example, see the following from the Saṃyuttanikāya, Salāyatanavagga, Navapūraṇavagga, Sutta No. 8: "Here a bhikkhu, having seen an object with the eye, knows when greed, hate, and delusion are within, 'Greed, hate, and delusion are in me'; he knows when greed, hate, and delusion are not within, 'Greed, hate, and delusion are not in me.' Bhikkhus, have these things to be experienced through faith, liking, what has been acquired by repeated hearing, specious reasoning, or a bias towards a notion that has been pondered over?" — "No, venerable sir." — "Bhikkhus, this even is the way by which a bhikkhu, apart from faith, liking, what has been acquired by repeated hearing, specious reasoning, or a bias towards a notion that has been pondered over, declares realization of knowledge thus: I know that birth has been exhausted, the celibate life has been lived, what must be done has been done and there is no more of this to come.") During the Ming, important masters like Hanshan Deqing, Zibo Zhenke, and Yunqi Zhuhong did not belong to any formal lineage. According to Jiang Wu, these eminent Ming Chan monks emphasized self-cultivation while criticizing nominal forms of recognition (such as through dharma transmission documents). Lachs also observes that of the famous four eminent masters of the Ming dynasty, three never obtained formal certificates of dharma transmission. (Note: The four eminent masters are: [1] Zibo Zhenke (1543–1603), [2] Yunqi Zhuhong (1535–1615), [3] Hanshan Deqing (1546–1623), and [4] Ouyi Zhixu (1599–1655).) Wu writes that for such monks at this time:

...training through self-cultivation was encouraged, and nominal and formulaic instructions from pretentious masters were despised. Eminent monks, who practiced meditation and asceticism but without proper dharma transmission, were acclaimed as acquiring 'wisdom without teachers' (wushizhi), a laudable title for them but a misfortune in the eyes of the more orthodox Chan masters in later generations, for whom dharma transmission defined their identity as Chan monks in a certain lineage. The negative attitude toward the role of teacher can be seen from Hanshan Deqing’s perspective. Though never receiving dharma transmission, he was often asked to write prefaces to the records of transmission in some obscure lineages. His writings testify that although the practice of dharma transmission was revived, Hanshan Deqing questioned its value seriously. For him, the enlightenment of the mind was more important than the nominal claim of dharma transmission. Because true enlightenment experience was valued, a few self-proclaimed Chan masters in the late Ming gained reputations as eminent monks without acquiring dharma transmission.

Examples can be found of monks during the Ming dynasty who relied on guidance from the scriptures in lieu of teachers. (Note: Regarding the power of scriptures to induce awakening in Chan, see Gregory's comments on Zongmi's initial awakening experience, which came about after reading just a few pages from the Sutra of Perfect Enlightenment, shortly after his ordination as a novice monk. Gregory writes: "...it is significant that his [Zongmi's] initial enlightenment did not occur while he was absorbed in meditation. Nor, as in the case of so many well-known Ch'an enlightenment stories, did it occur as a sudden burst of insight at the turning words or dramatic action of a master. Rather, it came about as a result of reading several lines of scripture." See also the following from Yongming Yanshou's Zongjing lu: "...if one wants to investigate the Buddha-vehicle, one will read extensively from the treasure storehouse [i.e., Buddhist scriptures]. Each and every [scripture] forces one to understand the truth about one’s own self; utterance after utterance causes one to mysteriously unite with true mind. One simply should not grasp onto written texts as the highest meaning, forming [artificial] views according to the words. One should directly seek out the message written down in the corpus of Buddhist scriptures, tacitly uniting with the truth that is inherently implicit [benzong]. At that point, the wisdom that does not depend on any teacher reveals itself, and the way of heavenly truth is no longer obscure.") For instance, Hanshan Deqing is said to have confirmed his own awakening through his reading of the Śūraṅgama Sūtra rather than the traditional method of relying on a master. Hanshan wrote that "After my great awakening, having no one to confirm and testify to it, I opened the Śūraṅgama Sūtra to verify my experience. I had not listened previously to lectures on this Sūtra and so did not know its meaning. Now by using the power of the direct reasoning of the nondiscriminating mind and without even the slightest use of its consciousness since there was no room for thinking, I gained after eight months a complete comprehension of its profound meaning without having a single doubt left."

Similarly, the Ming Chan monk Hanyue Fazang (1573–1635) had an awakening as a young man but could not find any masters to confirm his experience. He turned to the writings of the Song dynasty master Juefan Huihong (1071–1128), the Linji zongzhi and the Zhizheng zhuan, and relying on these texts, was able to verify his awakening and even declared himself to be Huihong's heir, although the two men were separated by many centuries. This phenomenon, known as "transmission by remote succession," was common in the late Ming when masters were unable to find proper teachers. Hanyue later wrote in his Guiding Words on the Zhizheng zhuan, "from now on, people who attain enlightenment without a master (wushi ziwu 無師自悟) can use this text to verify their enlightenment (yuci zhengzhi 於此證之)." (Note: Hanyue did eventually receive dharma transmission from Miyun Yuanwu (1566–1642) at the age of 52 when he was already a respected Chan master with his own monastery and disciples. However, for three years Hanyue did not accept Miyun's transmission, and the two men's relationship finally ended in a falling out over Hanyue's staunch insistence on regularly teaching the Zhizheng zhuan. The Zhizheng zhuan adopted a friendly attitude toward the sutras, affording them a place of high prominence. This was a position which Miyun strongly opposed. He regarded it as a Chan taboo, leading him to launch severe attacks against Hanyue.)

== In Japanese Zen ==
=== Kamakura period ===
The Japanese Zen teacher Nōnin (died c. 1194–1195), founder of the Daruma school, is the earliest example of mushi-dokugo in Japanese Zen. He is said to have declared himself to be a self-enlightened Zen master after abandoning the traditional Tendai establishment. As a self-proclaimed teacher, Nōnin founded Sambōji monastery and gained a following of monks and laymen, but was attacked for lacking dharma transmission. He dispatched two of his disciples to China bearing a letter and gifts seeking an audience with Fozhao Deguang (1121–1203), a Dharma heir of Dahui. Deguang acknowledged Nōnin's awakening, and the two disciples returned to Japan with Deguang's confirmation. Nōnin's fame subsequently spread far and wide, though he continued to receive criticism for his non-standard form of dharma transmission, as Deguang and Nōnin never met face-to-face.

Dōgen, the founder of the Sōtō school of Japanese Zen, acknowledged in his lifetime that such a phenomenon exists. According to Hee-Jin Kim, "enlightenment-by-oneself, without a teacher (mushi-dokugo), [is] the ultimate Zen principle that every practitioner had to actualize, even while studying under competent teachers and reading the sutras for a number of years." Independent, critical, reflective thinking as an integral part of meditation is mentioned in the fascicles of the Shōbōgenzō. That being said, Dōgen also wrote that dharma transmission through teacher-student relationships was necessary. The idea of mushi-dokugo is also discussed by Keizan. Regarding Keizan's position, Bernard Faure writes, "Keizan's attitude is ambiguous. Sometimes, like Dōgen in his hardly veiled criticism of the Darumashū, he insists on the importance of a face-to-face transmission between master and disciple, authenticated by a certificate of succession. At other times he seems to admit the possibility of 'awakening alone, without a master' (mushi dokugo), as Nōnin was said to have done." (Note: In modern Sōtō Zen, dharma transmission (shiho) is considered necessary to be an authorized representative of the Sōtō school but it does not indicate one is enlightened. (Note: Ten points to keep in mind about dharma transmission))

=== Tokugawa period ===
During the Tokugawa period in Japan, there were a great many priests who proclaimed to be self-enlightened. According to Haskel, "one of the most striking features of early Tokugawa Zen is the number of celebrated priests who achieved realization on their own." Haskel observes that three of the four masters listed by the scholar priest Mangen Shiban (1626–1710) as having revived Japanese Zen after a two-hundred-year period of decline fall under the self-enlightened category. These independents felt the poor state of Zen in Japan was such that no enlightened masters existed any longer to pass on the teachings and that "it was now up to the individual to enlighten himself and even to sanction his own experience." The perceived absence of enlightened teachers during this period forced on some individuals a highly independent and at times eccentric approach characterized by an "uncompromising search for autonomy and authenticity." Important Tokugawa figures who may be regarded as self-enlightened include "such notables as the Myōshin-ji masters Daigu, Ungo, Isshi and the Sōtō priest Suzuki Shōsan."

Daigu and Ungo had already both received dharma transmission in the Myōshin-ji line of Itchu Tōmoku (1522–1621) when they came to question their attainments, finding themselves disillusioned with the Zen establishment. They renounced their former achievements and in middle age set out on their own to seek true enlightenment, eventually attaining deep awakening experiences through their own efforts. Feeling that no qualified teachers existed in Japan to certify them, they were forced to verify their own enlightenment for themselves. Isshi initially trained at Daitokuji, though his mature Zen studies were undertaken largely independently. Upon his awakening in 1634 he also felt that there were no masters in Japan capable of verifying his enlightenment. Nonetheless, at the request of retired Emperor Gomizuno'o (1596–1680), Gudō Tōshoku granted his sanction upon Isshi, formally installing Isshi in the Myōshin-ji line. Gudō lauded Isshi as "one who immediately awakened himself without having to depend on others in his search."

Unlike the examples of Daigu and Ungo, who had originally been career priests, Suzuki Shōsan had been a samurai who later became a Zen teacher. Shōsan received ordination from Daigu. However, Daigu refused to confer a religious name upon him. He thus took the name Shōsan for himself. Royall Tyler writes that Shōsan "acknowledged no master," going on to state, "[a]lthough some sources claim Shōsan for Rinzai and he himself vigorously championed Sōtō, he in fact had friends on both sides and belonged to neither. He seems to have preferred being a lone voice. One feels that he wanted to save the world singlehandedly or not at all." Shōsan's independent enlightenment was defended in the Sōan zakki, a work by an anonymous author published fourteen years after Shōsan's death. There the question is raised whether Shōsan was a heretic since he did not receive transmission in any particular school of Zen but was rather "without a teacher and self-certified" (mushi-jishō). The text responds that the true meaning of mind-to-mind transmission is "knowing for oneself and attaining for oneself" (jichi jitoku), declaring that "To transmit some written statement or a robe is not the true Way."

The famous master of the period Takuan Sōhō believed the Dharma need not depend on an unbroken transmission from master to disciple. Like Ikkyū in the Muromachi period, Takuan refused to recognize an heir and chose instead to cut off his line, insisting the Dharma was always available to be discovered within by the right person. According to Haskel, Takuan's view was that "Zen mind exists any time a dedicated practitioner experiences realization, with or without a teacher's sanction and support." Takuan's refusal to pass on a lineage reflects a rejection of the view that "the torch of Zen" will be extinguished if it is not handed down in a master-disciple transmission. For Takuan, the truth of Zen cannot be destroyed since it is always present as the Buddha's original Dharma. It is enlightenment itself qua one's own intrinsic being, rather than some unbroken line of teachers and disciples, which is the true transmission that replicates and renews the experience of the Zen patriarchs. As such, Takuan stated, "That which is the Dharma cannot be passed on" and "That which can be passed on is not the Dharma." (Note: See also the following, contained in Takuan's Annals of the Sword Taia: "Do you want to obtain this? Walking, stopping, sitting or lying down, in speaking and in remaining quiet, during tea and during rice, you must never neglect exertion, you must quickly set your eye on the goal, and investigate thoroughly, both coming and going. Thus should you look straight into things. As months pile up and years pass by, it should seem like a light appearing on its own in the dark. You will receive wisdom without a teacher and will generate mysterious ability without trying to do so. At just such a time, this does not depart from the ordinary, yet it transcends it." Regarding the wisdom without a teacher referred to here, Takuan comments that it "means that you will acquire this fundamental wisdom without its ever having been transmitted to you by a teacher." Takuan also writes, "It cannot be transmitted with words, and no matter what method one may take, it cannot be taught. Therefore this is called the doctrine of 'a special transmission beyond instruction.' This is a doctrine outside the teachings of an instructor, a doctrine that particularly requires self-enlightenment and realization on one's own." See also the following statement from Takuan: "When a student's mind awakens, if he has a teacher, the teacher can confirm his awakening. That's all there is to it. If there is no teacher to offer confirmation, just say, 'I've grasped Zen. I've attained the Way.' But if you rashly open your mouth without cause, you won't escape having your tongue torn out in hell!")

In a similar vein, the Tokugawa master Bankei is said to have destroyed his own dharma transmission certificate. (Note: See also the story of Ikkyū, who destroyed his inka as well.) Bankei later expressed dissatisfaction with his teacher's level of attainment, feeling he had not grasped the full meaning of the unborn buddha mind. Bankei wrote to a disciple that enlightenment did not require a teacher:

This Dharma isn't anything you can learn from someone else. Even if she did see me, it would not help. Please convey this message to her from me. [...] Everybody's mind is the Buddha Mind, which is originally enlightened, so it's not something that is "born" or that "dies"; it neither comes nor goes, but is eternal, unalterable buddhahood. Thus, it's not a matter of your becoming a buddha now for the first time since you've been a buddha right from the start. That's why, instead of following other people's spiritual guidance, it's best to look to your own ordinary straightforward mind.

The Tokugawa-era Sōtō master Dokuan Genkō (1630–1698) was scathingly critical of the dharma transmission method which he called "paper Zen." Dokuan also criticized secret oral transmissions, stating that such things were not the meaning of Zen's "special transmission outside the scriptures." (Note: Various Chan sources are critical of secret teachings. For example, Shenhui said: "When other masters are asked about this teaching, they do not explain but keep it secret. I am completely different—whether to many persons or few, I always explain it to everyone. [...] The teachings of the buddhas of the past have all been directed at the eightfold congregation; there has been no private teaching, no secret teaching." See also Zongmi's Chan Prolegomenon: "'Do those who at present transmit the dharma speak secret oral transmissions [miyu] or not?' I have now answered this question. The dharma is Bodhidharma's dharma. Therefore, those who hear it, however deep or shallow, are all benefited. It is just that in the past it was secret, whereas now it is open. Therefore, it is not called a secret oral transmission. Just because the name is different [from what it was in Bodhidharma's time] does not imply that the dharma is also different." And also the Extensive Record of Baizhang: "Question: Since high antiquity the ancestral schools have all had esoteric sayings handed down successor to successor; what about it? The master said, There are no secret sayings; those who come to realize thusness do not have a secret treasure." And see also the Platform Sutra: "...Huiming [experienced] a great enlightenment. He then questioned me again, saying, ‘Other than the secret words and secret intention [you expressed] just now, is there any other secret intention?’ I said, ‘What I have preached to you is not secret. If you counter-illuminate [your own original face you will realize that] the secret was on your side.’") According to Dokuan, "what is called Zen enlightenment is not dependent on another’s enlightenment. It is only what you realize for yourself, attain for yourself, just as you know when you’ve eaten enough rice to satisfy your hunger, or drunk enough water to slake your thirst." Dokuan's critique of the transmission system went as far as to claim that only those who were self-awakened actually had the wisdom of the Buddha:

In today’s Zen temples they transmit the robe and bowl [i.e., the symbols of the teacher’s transmission]; but while the name continues, the reality [of enlightenment] has long ceased to exist. Those who carry on the wisdom of the buddhas and patriarchs rely on themselves, being enlightened independently, without a teacher; so that even though the name has ceased, the reality itself continues.

=== Modern Japan ===
The lay Zen master Shin'ichi Hisamatsu (1889–1980) was critical of contemporary kōan practice, in which one advances from one kōan to another. He regarded it as a form of gradualism, comparing it to trying to approximate a circle by forever increasing the number of sides of a polygon. He instead taught what he called his "fundamental kōan," which he said included all kōans. (Note: One version of Hisamatsu's fundamental kōan is: Standing will not do nor will sitting, Feeling will not do nor will thinking, Dying will not do nor will living, Then, what do I do?) Unlike traditional kōan practice, which usually requires the presence of a master to check one's understanding, Hisamatsu taught that the fundamental kōan could be practiced on one's own, without the guidance of a teacher. Hisamatsu said, "The teacher is YOU. [...] For this, there is no need for any guidance. You yourself, you can do it alone." Christopher Ives explains that Hisamatsu "questions the need to work with a certified Zen master." Ives observes that in Hisamatsu's approach, "one does not go to a particular master and present one's understanding of the kōan. Rather, one engages in 'mutual inquiry,' (sōgo sankyū) with other committed practitioners, on the assumption that one is ultimately meeting and engaging with the True Self."

== Korean Sŏn ==
Important Korean masters like Wŏnhyo (617–686) and Jinul (1158–1210) could also be seen as examples of the phenomenon of teacherless wisdom. Wŏhnyo experienced awakening after accidentally drinking water from a skull one night while staying in a dark cave during his travels on his way to China in order to seek the Dharma. Upon having this experience, Wŏnhyo understood that all phenomena were created by mind, and he subsequently concluded that there was no need for him to go on seeking the Dharma in China. In the case of Jinul, he neither received transmission from a recognized Sŏn master nor did he ever enter into an extended formal relationship with a teacher. According to Buswell, Jinul's relationship with his preceptor "does not seem to have been especially close," and his intellect and preference for solitude led him to focus on self-study of the scriptures. Buswell observes that Jinul, having never had a permanent teacher, "made up for the lack of personal instruction by drawing inspiration from the Buddhist scriptures. In the spirit of self-reliance that is central to Buddhism, he took responsibility for his own spiritual development and followed the path of practice outlined in the scriptures and confirmed through his own Sŏn meditation. Chinul's progress in Buddhist practice was, therefore, based on using scriptural instructions to perfect formal Sŏn practice."

More recently, the Korean Sŏn master Daehaeng (1927–2012), founder of the One Mind Sŏn Center, is said to have awakened on her own. As Pori Park observes, Daehaeng, who has been compared to a pratyekabuddha, or solitary buddha, "awakened herself through many years of ascetic practices rather than through teachers or going through formal Buddhist training." While still a young girl, Daehaeng awoke to a warm and comforting presence which she called appa, "daddy," eventually identifying it with buddha-nature. She later had her head shaved as a haengja (temple novice) with Hanam Sunim, staying briefly in a women's hermitage. However, she did not fit in well there. Having already seen her inherent nature, she found the monastic system artificial and too after the fact. She thus abandoned the temple, wandering freely from place to place. (Note: During this time, it is said that "She was so intense in her practice that to her there were no such things as keeping precepts or not keeping precepts, shaving off her hair or having long hair—there was only going inward.") Although from time to time she would visit Hanam Sunim, whom she respected, she was determined to be independent. She did not attempt to copy Hanam Sunim, but rather maintained a critical attitude. Hanam Sunim applauded her individualistic approach to Sŏn. Kyungrae Kim and Cheonghwan Park observe that Daehaeng never received dharma transmission, but rather bypassed "traditional routes of monastic training and mentorship," with the One Mind Sŏn Center presenting her as a solitary buddha "who attained enlightenment independently without the help of a teacher."

Stuart Lachs observes that the Korean Sŏn monastic system places less stress on the figure of the teacher than does Japanese Zen, which is more hierarchical. In Korean Sŏn, the role of pangjang, the equivalent of roshi, is an elected position with an initial ten year term limit. Pangjangs can also be recalled by a vote. Lachs feels this model is instructive, as it would remove much of the hierarchy and idealization of the teacher so prevalent in American Zen centers, which follow more the Japanese style. According to Buswell, in Korean Sŏn, the "master-student relationship is not nearly as formal and restrictive as we might suspect from most Western accounts of the Zen tradition. [...] Few [monks] develop a deep personal rapport with a single teacher. A monk's affinities are really more with his fellow meditation monks, rather than with a specific master. [...] In this way, Buddhist thought and practice is kept separate from the person of the master; a monk learns from many teachers, but does not take any one person's version of the dharma to be definitive."

== Vietnamese Thiền ==
The modern Vietnamese master Thích Thanh Từ is known as one of the most respected Vietnamese Zen teachers in all of Vietnam. He is famously known to have achieved an enlightenment experience through his own efforts without a Zen teacher. Trang T.D. Nguyen writes: "Thích Thanh Từ is considered the founder and the highest master of contemporary Vietnamese Thiền Tông. This is despite the fact that he has not been trained in meditation by any teacher or received the 'mind transmission' in any Chan zong/Thiền Tông school. Paradoxically, this does not affect his status of a 'Zen master', and his followers respect him in particular because he is believed to have discovered the path on his own, just as the Buddha did."

== In Tangut Chan materials ==
Tangut Chan, a now-extinct tradition which was practiced in Xixia, produced a text called Notes on the Essence of Hongzhou Doctrine with Commentary and Clarification, which sought to harmonize the Chan teachings of Mazu Daoyi of the Hongzhou School with the Heze School teachings of Shenhui and Guifeng Zongmi, as well as Huayan philosophy. The phenomenon of teacherless enlightenment is discussed in this work in the following question-and-answer exchange:

The question: “When [it] is realized through the teacher, there is a guide [to the disciple], and the awakening is due to come about. When [it] is realized through the absence of the teacher, there is no guide. How can awakening come about? The answer: “There is [a saying]: The mind becomes bright, when it sees rupa; [one] awakens to the Way when [he] hears a sound. All the existing dharmas can make clear the true substance. That is why when [one] awakens through the absence of the teacher, [in fact] there is a teacher.”

== See also ==
- Pratyekabuddha
- Mushin
- Daigo
- Dharma transmission
- Jiriki
- Kenshō
- Satori
- Enlightenment in Buddhism
- Svādhyāya, concept of self-study without the requirement of any guru or institution.

== Sources ==
- Bodiford, William M. (1991). "Dharma Transmission in Soto Zen: Manzan Dohaku's Reform Movement". Monumenta Nipponica. 46 (4). Sophia University: 423–451. doi:10.2307/2385187. ISSN 0027-0741. JSTOR 2385187.
- Dumoulin, Heinrich (2005). Zen Buddhism: Japan. World Wisdom, Inc. ISBN 978-0-941532-90-7.
- Faure, Bernard (1996). Visions of Power: Imagining Medieval Japanese Buddhism. Princeton University Press. ISBN 0-691-02941-5.
- Grigg, Ray (2012). Tao of Zen. Tuttle Publishing. ISBN 978-1-4629-0745-8.
- Harris, Ishwar C. (2004). The Laughing Buddha of Tofukuji: the Life of Zen Master Keido Fukushima. World Wisdom. ISBN 978-0-941532-62-4.
- Haskel, Peter (May 2001). Letting Go: The Story of Zen Master Tōsui. University of Hawaii Press. ISBN 0-8248-2440-7.
- Kim, Hee-Jin (2010). Dogen on Meditation and Thinking: A Reflection on His View of Zen. SUNY Press. ISBN 978-0-7914-8090-8.
