= Ajari =

Japanese term for senior monk

Ajari (阿闍梨) is a Japanese term that is used in various schools of Buddhism in Japan, specifically Tendai and Shingon, in reference to a senior monk who teaches students; often abbreviated to jari. The term is a Japanese rendering of the Chinese transliteration for the Sanskrit "âcârya," one who knows and teaches the rules." In the Sōtō tradition, this title is used in reference to any monk that has completed five ango—a way of demonstrating respect and reverence for them.

== See also ==
- Acharya
- Sunim
