= Suzuki Shōsan =

Japanese samurai (1579–1655)

Shōsan Suzuki
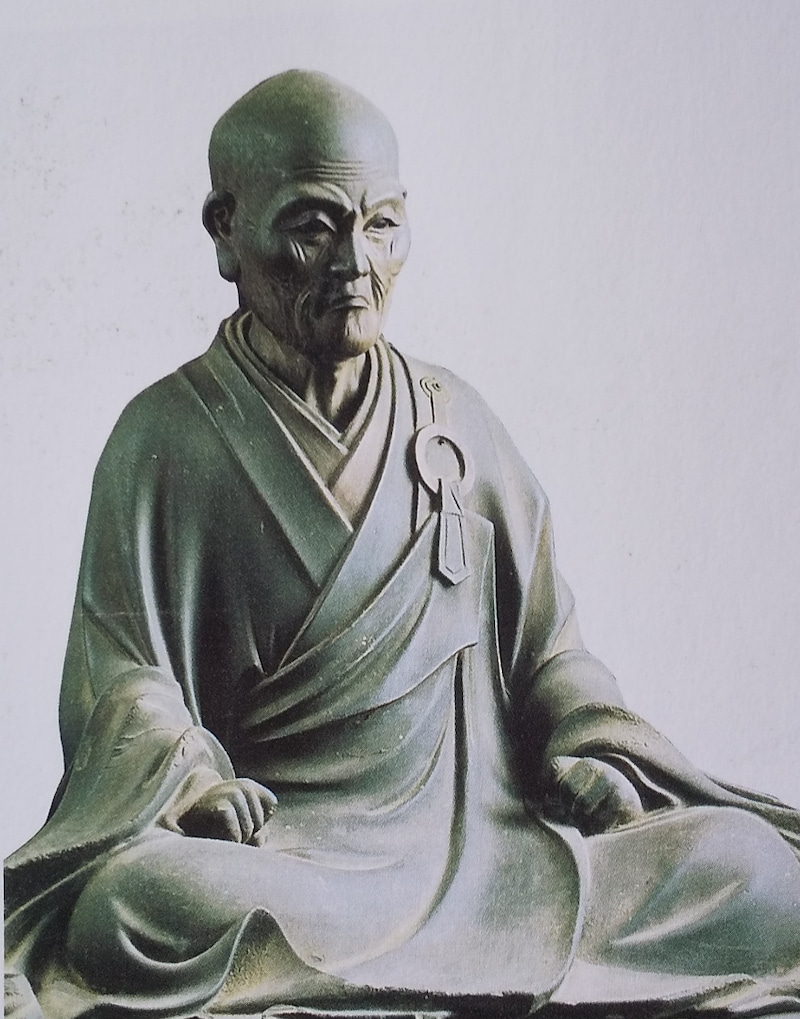
- Title: Samurai; Zen monk

Personal life
- Born: February 5, 1579 Japan
- Died: July 28, 1655 (aged 76)

Religious life
- Religion: Zen Buddhism

Suzuki Shōsan (鈴木正三; February 5, 1579 – July 28, 1655) was a Japanese samurai who served under the shōgun Tokugawa Ieyasu. Shōsan was born in modern-day Aichi Prefecture of Japan. He participated in the Battle of Sekigahara and the Battle of Osaka before renouncing life as a warrior and becoming a Zen Buddhist monk in 1621.

== Zen training ==
Shōsan traveled throughout Japan seeking out Zen masters and trained in several hermitages and temples, most notably at Myōshin-ji in Kyoto training under Gudō Toshoku (1577–1661). In 1636 Shōsan created a Zen booklet entitled Fumoto no Kusawake (or, Parting the Grasses at the Foot of the Mountain).

Shōsan trained under a little-known Zen master, Daigu Sochiku, who allowed Shōsan to keep his original name. Shōsan never actually received inka but was one of many in the Tokugawa period to claim jigo-jishō or "self-enlightenment without a teacher". He was a Zen Master who amassed a large following. In 1642, Shōsan, along with his brother, built 32 Buddhist temples in Japan. One was a Pure Land Buddhist temple in which he honoured the shōguns Tokugawa Ieyasu and Tokugawa Hidetada. Shōsan went on to write several treatises before his death in 1655 at 76 years old.

== Niō Zen ==
Suzuki Shōsan developed his own style of Zen, Niō Zen “仁王不動禪”, or Guardian King Zen. Shōsan instructed his students to meditate on the Niō, the fierce-looking Guardians that represent Vajrapani and can be seen at the gates of many Buddhist temples, to help them channel energy to use in meditation and in developing vitality, courage and "death energy" or the readiness to confront death at any moment which are the most important characteristics of a warrior.

Shosan's dedication to bringing Buddhism to people from all segments of society intensified as he grew older. He believed that the virtue of Buddhism depended on its usefulness to one's country and people in the real world. Shosan taught that true enlightenment comes during one's daily tasks. Whether one is "tilling fields, or selling wares, or even confronting an enemy in the heat of battle, direct enlightenment will occur at key moments of one's day to day life". Shosan saw true enlightenment in an untraditional way by discarding the belief that enlightenment can only occur in matters of direct recluse or the renouncement, and therefore true Buddhism has nothing to do with "gentle piety or theory, even though most monks were taught to practice in this manner". Sometimes he asked learners to physically emulate the postures of the Niō, as well as other warrior deities like Fudo and Bishamonten, to aid them in concentration. The energy gained by thinking about the Niō was purported to help learners develop a warrior's fortitude, and to overcome the evil energies that inhibited them from progressing towards enlightenment.

== Works ==
- Mōanjō (盲安杖; "A Safe Staff for the Blind"), 1619
- Fumoto no Kusawake ("Parting the Grasses at the Foot of the Mountain"), 1636
- Ha Kirishitan (破切支丹; "Crush Christianity"), 1642
- Roankyō (驢鞍橋; "Donkey Saddle Bridge"), 1648
- Ninin Bikuni (二人比丘尼; "Two Nuns"), 1664
- Banmin Tokuyō (萬民徳用; "Right Action for All"), 1661
