= Gyeongheo =

Korean buddhist monk (1849–1912)

Gyeongheo / 경허 / 鏡虛
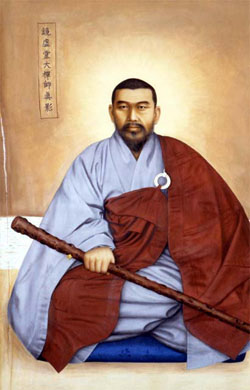
- Title: Soen Sa Nim

Personal life
- Born: 1846 Jadong-ri, Jeonju, Korea
- Died: 1912 (aged 65–66)

Religious life
- Religion: Buddhism
- School: Chogye (Seon)

Senior posting
- Teacher: Manhwa Bosŏn
- Successor: Suwŏl–sŏnsa (1855–1928), Hyewŏl–sŏnsa (1861–1937), Man’gong–sŏnsa (1871–1946), Hanam–sŏnsa (1876–1951)

Kyong Ho Seonsa (Korean: 경허선사; Hanja: 鏡虛禪師; 1849–1912) was a famous Korean Sŏn master, and the 75th Patriarch of Korean Sŏn. His original name was Song Tonguk (송동욱; 宋東旭); and his dharma name was Sŏng’u (성우; 惺牛). He is known as the reviver of modern Korean Sŏn Buddhism. Song Tonguk was born in southern Korea (Chŏnju, Chŏlla province), and entered the sangha at the age of nine in 1857. He ordained at Ch'ŏnggye monastery located at Uiwang, in Kyŏnggi province. The young monk studied under the tutelage of Kyehŏ–sŏnsa. When he was 14, in 1862, Kyehŏ–sŏnsa disrobed and sent Kyŏnghŏ–sŏnsa to Manhwa–sŏnsa for further study at Tonghak–sa. Kyŏnghŏ soon distinguished himself as a sūtra-lecturer until a dramatic incident took place in 1879 while Kyŏnghŏ was travelling to Seoul to meet his previous teacher Kyehŏ–sŏnsa. On the way he entered a village looking for shelter from a rainstorm and discovered that every inhabitant of the village had died from an epidemic. Kyŏnghŏ came to understand that his knowledge of Buddhist sūtras did not help him with the issues of life and death. When Kyŏnghŏ returned to his monastery, he summarily dismissed all of his students and began serious Sŏn meditation practice. The kongan he worked with was Master Lingyun’s (771-853) “The donkey is not yet done and the horse has already arrived.” He suddenly understood the meaning of his kongan when he was reading the words, “Even though I should become a cow, there will be no nostrils.” Kyŏnghŏ attained enlightenment on November 15, 1887. After his awakening, Kyŏnghŏ wrote:

Upon hearing that there are no nostrils, I realize the whole world is my home; on the path under the Yŏnam mountain in June, people in the fields enjoy the day, singing the song of good harvest.

Kyŏnghŏ now devoted himself to teaching Sŏn at various monasteries including Pŏmŏ–sa, Haein–sa and Sŏnggwang–sa until his disappearance in 1905. His activities from 1905 until his death in 1912 are not clear. Some claim that he wandered around in the northern part of Korea as a beggar; and other sources report that he lived a life of a layperson, letting his hair grow and teaching Confucian classics.

Kyŏnghŏ's role in Korean Buddhism is great because his main disciples, Suwŏl–sŏnsa (1855–1928), Hyewŏl–sŏnsa (1861–1937), Man’gong–sŏnsa (1871–1946), and Hanam–sŏnsa (1876–1951) were extremely important in the transmission of the dharma. Kyŏnghŏ is recognized as the founder of modern Korean Sŏn Buddhism: he revived Jinul’s idea of kanhwa Sŏn and also lived the life of a bodhisattva with his unobstructed actions, in the manner of his distant predecessor Wŏnhyo (617-686). Kyŏnghŏ was also a great proponent of teaching lay Buddhists Sŏn meditation, which was revolutionary because he both devoted himself to meditation in a hermitage and also lived among lay Buddhists in the secular world. Kyŏnghŏ’s unconventional lifestyle and eccentric character brought him some criticism as well as fame amongst the followers of the "wild freedom" style Sŏn masters.

== See also ==
- Mangong
- Hanam Jungwon
- Cheonggyesa
