= Daewon =

South Korean Zen buddhist (born 1936)

Daewon 대원 大圓
- Title: Zen Master

Personal life
- Born: Moon Jae-hyeon; 1936 (age 89–90) Korea, Empire of Japan

Religious life
- Religion: Buddhism
- School: Seon

- Daewon
- Hangul: 대원 문재현 선사
- Hanja: 大圓 文載賢 禪師
- Revised Romanization: Daewon Mun Jaehyeon Seonsa
- McCune–Reischauer: Taewŏn Mun Chaehyŏn Sŏnsa

Zen Master Daewon Moon Jae-hyeon (born January 23, 1936) is a Korean Zen master in South Korea. A disciple of Zen Master Jeongang, he received Dharma transmission from his teacher and thereby becoming the 78th patriarch in the Dharma Lineage of the Buddha in 1962.

== Activities ==
=== Teaching activities ===
After a period spent in isolation in 1988 he founded Moonzen and the Moonzen Zen Centers in order to widely spread the teaching he received from his master, Zen Master Jeongang. Zen Master Daewon educates and trains his disciples at Moonzen Zen Centers around the country.

=== Interest in environment ===
Faced with the many phenomena that accompany climate change, in 2009 Zen Master Daewon established the International Union to Prevent Desertification (IUPD). He is active in participating in the resolution of climate change. For example, through IUPD, Zen Master Daewon opened the measures to prevent the desertification at the UNCCD (United Nations Convention to Combat Desertification) and made an agreement with Burkina Faso and the Republic of Niger in order to stop the desertification. At present, after a successful test, the process to change barren desert into grass land is in steady process in the two countries.

== Dharma transmission ==
=== Early life and background ===
He is recognized as a disciple of Zen Master Jeongang, the 77th patriarch and Zen Master of the Jogye Order of Korean Buddhism. Zen Master Daewon received Dharma Transmission from Zen Master Jeongang. When Master Daewon was 12, his father died in front of his eyes, and this experience left an indelible imprint on the young man's view of the world. As soon as he was able to leave his house, in 1954 he entered into the large monastery, Hae-in-sa temple under the mentorship of his preceptor Master Pak In-gok.

=== Searching for the true master ===
Since he was motivated to understand about life and death he searched around the country for an enlightened master with whom he could practice with. After practicing for several years he finally was able to meet with the famous Zen Master Jeongang sunim. In 1962 while he was practicing at Dong-hwa-sa temple the following story has been left behind.

=== Part of the dharma transmission story ===
Prior to the summer monastic retreat, the abbot of the Dong-hwa-sa temple, Wolsan sunim had publicly announced that the Zen Master Jeongang would be overseeing the 3 month retreat so meditators from around the country gathered there to practice. One evening, during a session of sitting meditation, all of the seats in the meditation hall were empty except for those of a couple elder monks. The young Daewon thought this to be unusual and then saw a young monk furtively call him out, quietly waving at him from outside the hall. When he went to him, the young monk told Daewon sunim that a group of monks were waiting for him up on the mountain out back. Daewon sunim followed the young monk into the mountain and found a gathering of twenty monks, waiting for him in stony silence. Immediately upon seeing Daewon sunim, one of the monks named Beopseong (presently known as the Zen Master Jinje, a disciple of Zen Master Hyanggok), called out to him, "Say something about Bodhidharma's 'I don't know.' Kong-an (Koan)." Daewon sunim answered without a moment's hesitation, "Revealed." Songam sunim, who was standing nearby asked him about the Ansujeongdeung Kong-an (Koan), "How would you save yourself?" Daewon sunim spoke loudly, "An (岸)! Su (樹)! Jeong (井)! Deung (藤)!" All the gathered monks stood still with their lips pursed in silence as Daewon sunim turned around and walked away. The next day after breakfast, Myeongheo sunim, who was serving as monitor for the retreat, called a temple hearing to find out why the monks had been absent without notice the night before. During the hearing, all that had happened up on the mountain was laid out in the open and as a result, the monks who had been absent during the sitting meditation session assumed their formal robes and bowed in penance before Zen Master Jeongang, who was serving as the Josil of the temple at the time.

=== Birth of the 78th patriarch ===
The next day, Zen Master Jeongang called on Daewon sunim. He told Daewon that his first Song of Enlightenment was clear evidence of his enlightenment but that a Song of Enlightenment is customarily kept short. To this, Daewon sunim recited the second Song of Enlightenment he had composed when he saw the sun and the moon in the setting sky while passing the fields of Gimje. After Zen Master Jeongang heard the second Song of Enlightenment, he again asked Master Daewon to make up another song on the spot that would encapsulate the same stage of enlightenment. Immediately upon this request, Master Daewon produced the following song:

Over the rock the wind passes through the pine trees,
And below the mountain flies the golden oriole.
There is not a trace even of the entire universe,
But the monkey cries loudly under the moonlight.

Zen Master Jeongang listened to the first two lines with his eyes gently closed; then upon hearing the last two lines, he opened his eyes, revealing delight. However, he did not stop there and asked once more, "When the others called you out on the mountain and Beopseong asked you to speak on the 'I don't know.' Kong-an (Koan), you said, 'Revealed.' If you were Emperor Wu of Liang, how would you respond to Bodhidharma's 'I don't know.'?" "If I was Emperor Wu of Liang, I'd respond by saying 'Even though there is no such thing as a saint, wouldn't it be much better to enjoy the flowering of my virtue together, just like this?' and take him by the hand." Zen Master Jeongang spoke with astonishment, "How have you reached such a stage?" "How could one say that he has reached it, that he has it, or that it is of his nature? It is only just like this." In this manner, the reverend Daewon, received Dharma Transmission from the Master Jeongang and in 1962 became the 78th patriarch in the Korean tradition of Zen.

== Academic Lineage of Buddhist Doctrine (Lineage of Instruction) ==
At his ordination ceremony in 2009, Zen Master Daewon was received into the Academic Lineages of Buddhist Doctrine by Zen Masters: Hoegwang Saseonbul (晦光 師璿佛) and Yongseong Jinjong (龍城 震鍾).

== Buddhist texts translation and publications ==
Zen Master Daewon has translated and published collections of kong-ans, famous sutras, analects of Buddhist patriarchs and many profound Buddhist texts. Furthermore, he has reinterpreted these works with a modern viewpoint and added his own gathas and incisive comments.

As of 2015, Zen Master Daewon is translating 80 volumes of the Avatamsaka Sutra and is also preparing to publish more Buddhist texts.

=== Translations ===
==== The Collections of kong-an (koan) ====
- 傳燈錄 The Record of Transmission of the Lamp 1 ISBN 978-89-86214-09-3
- 傳燈錄 The Record of Transmission of the Lamp 2 ISBN 978-89-86214-01-7
- 傳燈錄 The Record of Transmission of the Lamp 3 ISBN 978-89-86214-02-4
- 傳燈錄 The Record of Transmission of the Lamp 4 ISBN 978-89-86214-03-1
- 傳燈錄 The Record of Transmission of the Lamp 5 ISBN 978-89-86214-04-8
- 禪門拈頌 Songs of Zen 1 ISBN 978-89-86214-22-2
- 禪門拈頌 Songs of Zen 2 ISBN 978-89-86214-23-9
- 禪門拈頌 Songs of Zen 3 ISBN 978-89-86214-24-6
- 禪門拈頌 Songs of Zen 4 ISBN 978-89-86214-25-3
- 禪門拈頌 Songs of Zen 5 ISBN 978-89-86214-26-0
- 禪門拈頌 Songs of Zen 6 ISBN 978-89-86214-27-7
- 禪門拈頌 Songs of Zen 7 ISBN 978-89-86214-28-4
- 禪門拈頌 Songs of Zen 8 ISBN 978-89-86214-29-1
- 禪門拈頌 Songs of Zen 9 ISBN 978-89-86214-30-7
- 禪門拈頌 Songs of Zen 10 ISBN 978-89-86214-31-4
- 禪門拈頌 Songs of Zen 11 ISBN 978-89-86214-32-1
- 禪門拈頌 Songs of Zen 12 ISBN 978-89-86214-33-8
- 禪門拈頌 Songs of Zen 13 ISBN 978-89-86214-34-5
- 禪門拈頌 Songs of Zen 14 ISBN 978-89-86214-35-2
- 禪門拈頌 Songs of Zen 15 ISBN 978-89-86214-36-9
- 禪門拈頌 Songs of Zen 16 ISBN 978-89-86214-37-6
- 禪門拈頌 Songs of Zen 17 ISBN 978-89-86214-38-3
- 禪門拈頌 Songs of Zen 18 ISBN 978-89-86214-39-0
- 禪門拈頌 Songs of Zen 19 ISBN 978-89-86214-40-6
- 禪門拈頌 Songs of Zen 20 ISBN 978-89-86214-41-3
- 禪門拈頌 Songs of Zen 21 ISBN 978-89-86214-42-0
- 禪門拈頌 Songs of Zen 22 ISBN 978-89-86214-43-7
- 禪門拈頌 Songs of Zen 23 ISBN 978-89-86214-44-4
- 禪門拈頌 Songs of Zen 24 ISBN 978-89-86214-45-1
- 禪門拈頌 Songs of Zen 25 ISBN 978-89-86214-46-8
- 禪門拈頌 Songs of Zen 26 ISBN 978-89-86214-47-5
- 禪門拈頌 Songs of Zen 27 ISBN 978-89-86214-48-2

==== The Quotations of the Zen Masters ====
- 無問關 The Gateless Gate ISBN 978-89-86214-05-5
- 碧巖錄 The Blue Cliff Record ISBN 978-89-86214-06-2
- 信心銘 The Gateway to Faithful Mind by Zen Master Sengcan ISBN 978-89-86214-12-3
- 法融禪師心銘 The Gateway to Faithful Mind by Zen Master Beobyung ISBN 978-89-86214-73-4
- 證道歌 The Song of Spiritual Attainment ISBN 978-89-86214-53-6
- 禪家龜鑑 The Mirror of Seon (Zen) ISBN 978-89-86214-72-7
- 法性偈 The Song of Dharma Nature ISBN 978-89-86214-75-8
- 龐居士語錄 The Quotations of Buddhist Layman Bang ISBN 978-89-86214-79-6
- 顯宗記 Revelation of the Truth by Zen Master Shinhoe ISBN 978-89-86214-81-9

==== Sutras ====
- 天符經 Celestial Sign Sutra ISBN 978-89-86214-07-9
- 金剛經 Diamond Sutra ISBN 978-89-86214-08-6
- 般若心經 Prajñā-Paramitā Sutra (The Heart Sutra) ISBN 978-89-86214-54-3
- 般若心經 The Heart Sutra (Pocket book) ISBN 978-89-86214-74-1
- 維摩經 Vimalakirtinirdesha Sutra ISBN 978-89-86214-94-9

==== The Collections of Dharma Lectures ====
- "Sweet!" – Dharma Lecture Collection of the Great Zen Master Jeongang ISBN 978-89-86214-76-5
- 騎牛牧童歌 Song of a Shepherd Boy Riding on a Cow ISBN 978-89-86214-77-2
- 初發心自警文 Beginners’ Book for Vigilance ISBN 978-89-86214-78-9
- Sitting or Standing, Enter Nirvana (die) with Complete Freedom ISBN 978-89-86214-90-1
- 看堂論 Kan-dang-non ISBN 978-89-86214-92-5

==== The Collections of Gathas ====
- 佛祖正脈 Dharma lineage of the Buddha and Patriarchs (in 3 languages) ISBN 978-89-86214-85-7

==== The Guide for Buddhist Ceremonies ====
- The Guide for Buddhist Prayer and Ceremonies (complete version in Korean) ISBN 978-89-86214-93-2

==== History books ====
- 桓檀古記 (Hwandan Gogi: A Compilation of Texts on Ancient Korean History) 1 – The Compass of Truth ISBN 978-89-86214-67-3
- 桓檀古記 (Hwandan Gogi: A Compilation of Texts on Ancient Korean History) 2 – The Compass of History ISBN 978-89-86214-68-0
- 桓檀古記 (Hwandan Gogi: A Compilation of Texts on Ancient Korean History) 3 – The Compass of History ISBN 978-89-86214-69-7
- 桓檀古記 (Hwandan Gogi: A Compilation of Texts on Ancient Korean History) 4 – The Compass of History ISBN 978-89-86214-70-3
- 桓檀古記 (Hwandan Gogi: A Compilation of Texts on Ancient Korean History) 5 – The Compass of History ISBN 978-89-86214-71-0

=== Books by Zen Master Daewon ===
==== The Collections of Zen Dharma Lectures ====
- Eternal Reality ISBN 978-89-86214-11-6
- Never Allowed Even a Hal (Shout) of Bodhidharma ISBN 978-89-86214-89-5

==== Questions and Answers on Asceticism ====
- To You Who Ask Zen 1 ISBN 978-89-86214-56-7
- To You Who Ask Zen 2 ISBN 978-89-86214-57-4

==== Questions and Answers on Zen ====
- Garden Chrysanthemums and First Mountain Snow ISBN 978-89-86214-52-9
- 話頭 Hwa-du ISBN 978-89-86214-91-8

==== Collection of Poetical Works ====
- Time is a Stick and the World is a Drum ISBN 978-89-86214-10-9

==== Collection of Dharma Lectures for Ordinary People ====
- To Be a Genuine (True) Buddhist ISBN 978-89-86214-86-4
- 33 FAQs on Buddhism ISBN 978-89-86214-87-1
- The 108 Recitations of Repentance in 3 languages ISBN 978-89-86214-88-8
- Experience of Reality ISBN 978-89-86214-80-2
- Experience of Reality (International version in 5 languages) ISBN 978-89-86214-95-6
