= Chunseong =

Korean Buddhist monk (1891–1977)

- Born: Lee Chang-rim; March 30, 1891; Inje, Kangwon Province (pre-1910), Joseon
- Died: August 22, 1977 (aged 86); Mangwolsa, Uijongbu, South Korea

Korean name
- Hangul: 이창림
- Hanja: 李昌林
- RR: I Changrim
- MR: I Ch'angnim

Art name
- Hangul: 춘성, 무애도인
- Hanja: 春性, 無碍道人
- RR: Chunseong, Muaedoin
- MR: Ch'unsŏng, Muaedoin

Dharma name
- Hangul: 춘성
- Hanja: 春城
- RR: Chunseong
- MR: Ch'unsŏng

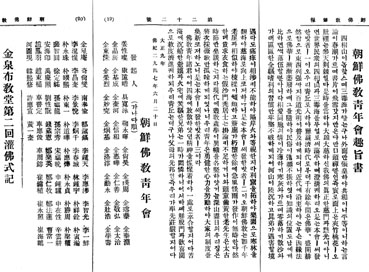

Chunseong (춘성; 春城) was the Dharma name of Lee Chang-rim (1891–1977; Korean: 이창림; Hanja: 李昌林), a Korean Buddhist monk, scholar, poet, writer, and philosopher who was also known by the art name Muaedoin (무애도인; 無碍道人).

== Family ==
Chunseong was born on March 30, 1891 in Inje County, Kangwon Province, Joseon, the fifth son of tenant farmer Yi Ino (이인오; 李仁五) and Lady Pak of Miryang (밀양박씨). His family line was of the Pyeongchang Lee clan (평창이씨; 平昌李氏), and although his birth name was Lee Chang-rim his Dharma name was Chunseong, leading to him often being called Chunseong Chunseong (春城 春性).

== Life as a monk ==
While he was still young Chunseong went to the Baekdamsa Buddhist temple (백담사) in Inje and begged to be taken in as a pupil. But the abbess rejected him because he was too young. Eventually, at age fifteen, he did become a Buddhist monk, apprenticed to Han Yong-un. As part of his training Chunseong was required to study Hwaeomgyeong (화엄경; 華嚴經) and Geumganggyeong (금강경; 金剛經), studying them so well that he could recite Hwaeomgyeong backwards. As a result he earned the nickname "Hwaeom monk" (화엄법사; 華嚴法師).

Throughout his life Chunseong slept without a quilt or blanket. This was because in the Korean language the spelling of quilt is "Yibul" (이불), which also means "to separate from Buddha". Since he did not want to "separate from Buddha" when asleep, he thus refused to sleep with a blanket (이불, 離佛). Chunseong also did not believe in owning things, giving away all the money he received from his followers. Even when they gave him clothes he would give them to beggars and vagrants he encountered, having to hide his naked body until he could return to the temple at night.

In November 1918 Chunseong's teacher Han Yong-un published Yusim (trans: "whole mind"), a series of magazines written to make Buddhism appeal to youth, and the following year Yong-un was imprisoned for his involvement with the March 1st Movement. Chunseong remained dutiful to his teacher while he was in prison and was the only head monk who regularly visited or sent food and supplies. Even though his temple had plenty of firewood, Chunseong refused to use any heat during winter and slept in a freezing cold room, saying:

"My teacher is shivering in a cold cell in Seodaemun Prison because he was captured by the Japanese while fighting for independence. So how can I, his disciple, sleep in the comfort of a warm room?"

== Later life ==
In the 1940s Chunseong refused to cooperate with the law of Sōshi-kaimei (창씨개명; 創氏改名) which required him to change his name to comply with the Japanese colonial authorities.

In 1944 Chunseong went to the Doksungsan Sudeok Temple where he studied under Mangong Song Wolmyon, who was top of the Korean Ganhwaseon (看話禪, 간화선). In 1946 he returned to Mangwol Temple (망월사; 望月寺) as its head, at times being attacked for hypocrisy, rigorism, pretended philanthropy, and formalism.

In July 1949 he participated in funerals for Kim Ku.

In 1950, during the Korean War, he escaped and returned to Mangwol Temple, where he preserved both the temple and the Ganhwaseon tradition.

In the 1950s Chunseong became abbot of Mangwol Temple, Shinheung Temple, and Bomun Temple.

== Satire and humor ==
Chonseong used satire and humorous stories to impart his teachings, including the following.

=== "My hometown is my mother's vagina" ===
Right after the Korean War it was illegal to cut down trees, and even though it was freezing cold no one could gather firewood to heat themselves. Chunseong decided to cut down some wood for firewood as well as to make repairs to the dilapidated temple, but was caught and arrested by the Japanese police for violating forestry laws. During his interrogation at the Uijeongbu Police Station a detective asked Chunseong, "What is your address?" to which he replied, "My mother's vagina." The detective thought Chunseong was strange so he rephrased his question to, "Where is your hometown?" Again, Chunseong replied, "My mother's vagina".

Despite numerous versions of the questions Chunseong still only responded with, "My mother's vagina". This infuriated the detective so he told Chunseong to stop messing around and give a proper answer, now asking, "Where is your legal domicile?" This time Chunseong responded with, "My father's penis." At this point the police realized that they weren't able to get through to him and sent him away, assuming he wasn't mentally sound.

=== "Jesus' resurrection" ===
One day after visiting a temple, Chonseong was on his way back to Uijeongbu on a bus. Another passenger on the bus was a Christian fanatic who was shouting into a loudspeaker, "Believe in Jesus Christ who died and was resurrected! If you believe in Him, you will go to heaven!" This Christian saw that Chunseong was dressed in a monk's robe and decided to stand in front of him and yell these words. Chunseong decided to yell back, "What did you say? He died and rose again? The only thing that dies and rises again is my penis every morning!" The Christian felt awkward and got off at the next station.

=== "The commander of monks" ===
Chunseong enjoyed alcoholic drinks and often drank beer and makgeolli, which he referred to as gokcha, or grain drinks. One night he had too much to drink and was caught violating curfew hours by a police officer. The police officer asked "Who are you?" Chunseong replied, "I am a Jungdaejang (trans: "company commander")!" The police officer went closer to him and upon seeing that he was not in the military but rather was dressed in a monk's robe he said, "Why would you lie by saying that you were a company commander?" Chunseong replied, "I am the commander (daejang) of monks (jung), so am I not a Jungdaejang?" Upon hearing this joke the police officer thought Chunseong was a strange man but let him go on his way.

=== "Teaching a lesson to a spinster" ===
An elderly woman who regularly sought Chunseong to hear his lectures had a granddaughter who was a spinster because her standards were too high. The elderly woman sent her granddaughter to Chunseong so that he could teach her a lesson. The granddaughter showed up to meet him wearing a miniskirt, and on seeing her Chunseong said, "How can my big thing fit into your tiny thing?" The granddaughter's face grew bright red as she ran out of the room crying out that he was a "sham of a monk". She returned home, upset with her grandmother for sending her to see this monk. But her grandmother explained that what Chunseong really meant was, "How can his large teaching fit into your tiny mind". Upon hearing this the spinster felt ashamed that she had jumped to a sexual conclusion.

== Last years ==
In 1964 Chunseong was invited to Chungwadae (청와대; 靑瓦臺) by the South Korean regent Park Chung Hee since the first lady, Yuk Young-su, was a devout Buddhist. During his visit Chunseong said, "The Lady Yuk was born from her mother's vagina", which caused many to panic.

In 1970 he retrurned to Mangwol temple, and from 1970 to 1973 he practised asceticism for Jangjabulwa (장좌불와; 長坐不臥).

In 1973 he participated in public campaigns for safe driving and sobriety.

== Death ==
Chunseong died on August 22, 1977 in Mangwolsa, Uijongbu, at the age of 86. He did not have a coffin, preferring his corpse be covered with a straw mat. His funeral was short, with the monks singing "Grief of a Drifter" (나그네 설움) during the short funeral march. His ashes are enshrined at the Bongkuk Temple in Seongnam.

Long after his death Chunseong's name was a social taboo in South Korea because his controversial words and actions were contrary to the social influence of Confucianism. That taboo eased in the 1990s, and in 2002 Doal Kim Yong-ok used one of his anecdotes for a program on EBS. By 2004 South Korean broadcasting programs were beginning to report more of his words and actions.

== See also ==
- Korean Buddhism
- Korean Seon

== Sources ==
- Doh Jin-Soon: Great Monk & Great Learning (큰 스님 큰 가르침) (Seoul; Moonwae, 2006)
- Kim Kwang-sik: Choonseong:Mooaedoin's Story (춘성:무애도인 삶의 이야기) (Seoul; SaeSsak, 2009)
- Samjoong: The More Story Behind (숨겨왔던 많은 이야기들) (Seoul, KukbooCarma, 2009)
