= Deoksungsan =

Mountain in South Korea

Coordinates: 36°40′18″N 126°37′05″E

Highest point
- Elevation: 495 m (1,624 ft)

Geography
- Location: South Chungcheong Province, South Korea

Deoksungsan (Korean: 덕숭산) is a mountain of South Chungcheong Province, western South Korea. It has an elevation of 495 metres (1,624 feet).

== Attractions ==
- Sudeoksa, a Korean Buddhist temple, it offers visitors a "Temple Stay Program".

== See also ==
- List of mountains of Korea
