= Sudeoksa =

Buddhist temple in South Chungcheong, South Korea

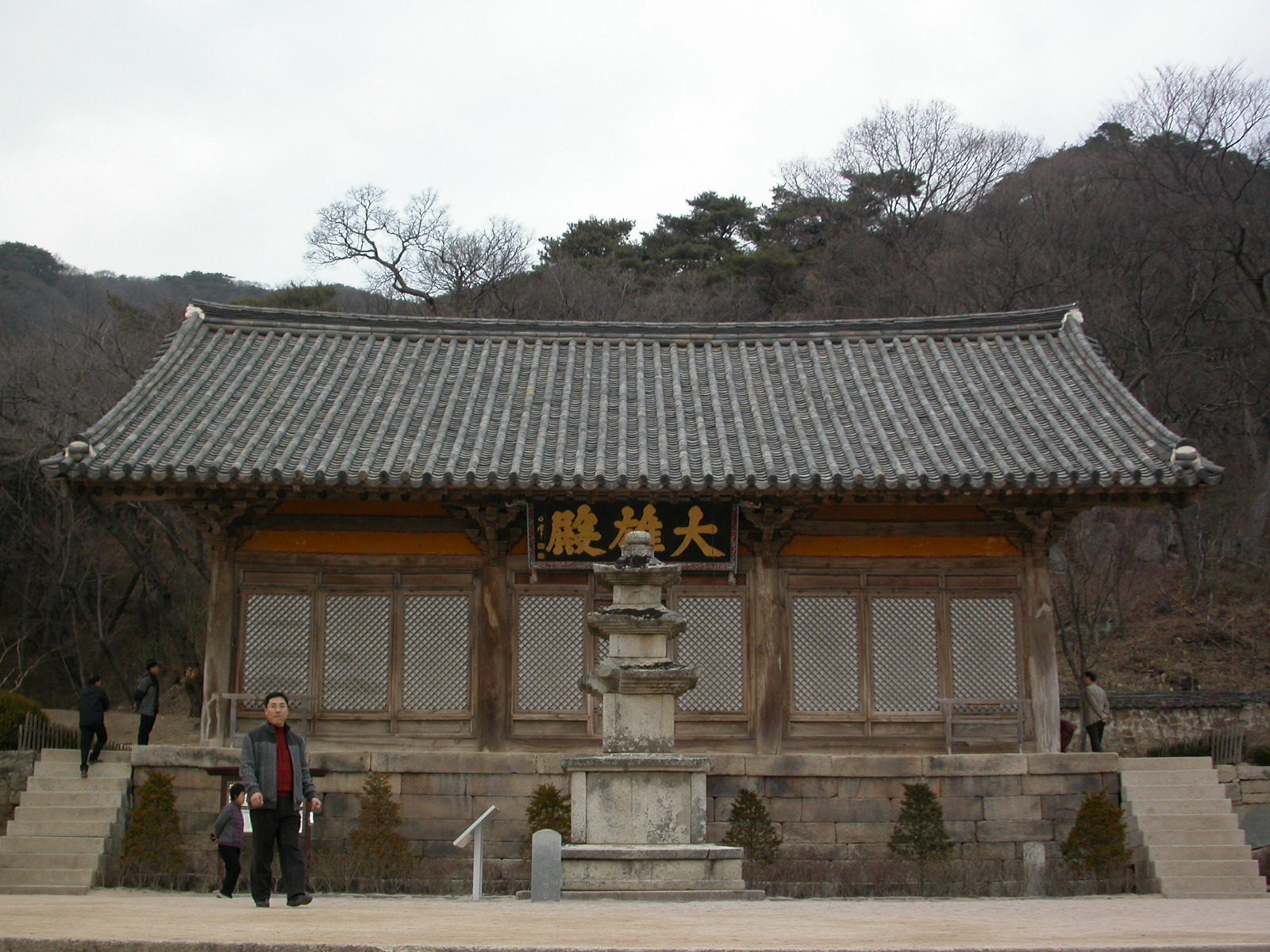

- Location within South Korea

Religion
- Affiliation: Buddhism

Location
- Location: 79 Sudeoksa-angil Deoksan-myeon Yesan-gun South Chungcheong Province (Korean: 충청남도 예산군 덕산면 수덕사안길 79)
- Country: South Korea
- Coordinates: 36.6633°N 126.6223°E

Architecture
- Elevation: 151 m (495 ft)

Korean name
- Hangul: 수덕사
- Hanja: 修德寺
- RR: Sudeoksa
- MR: Sudŏksa

Sudeoksa (Korean: 수덕사) is a head temple of the Jogye Order of Korean Buddhism. It is located on the southern slopes of Deoksungsan in Deoksan-myeon, Yesan County, South Chungcheong Province, South Korea.

Sudeoksa was one of very few temples not destroyed during the Japanese invasions of Korea (1592–1598) (the Imjin Wars). Its main hall is South Korea's oldest wooden building, having been constructed by Goryeo in 1308. This Mahavira Hall is National Treasure of South Korea 49.

== History ==
The Only Remaining Baekje Temple

Sudeoksa Temple (Korean: 수덕사; Hanja: 修德寺) has little known history as surviving records are scarce in comparison to its age. One record says it was established by Ven. Jimyeong Beopsa during the reign of Baekje's King Wideok, and another tells that it was by Ven. Sungje Beopsa in the late Baekje era. Neither claim is backed up by records. However, there is evidence that Ven. Hyehyeon taught at Sudeoksa in 601, and so the temple seems to have been established before that. There are 12 Baekje temples mentioned in literature, including Heungnyunsa, Wangheungsa, Chiraksa, Sudeoksa, Sajasa, and Mireuksa; Sudeoksa Temple is the only surviving one. Considering the fact that a number of Baekje-era roof tiles have been found there, it seems most likely that the temple originated in the Baekje era.

No particular records of Sudeoksa Temple from the Goryeo era remain, but a "ridge beam scroll," discovered during repairs reveals that the Main Buddha Hall was established in 1308. Thus, the temple must have maintained its stature as a major Buddhist temple until the end of the Goryeo era. It is said to have been renovated by Seon Master Naong Hyegeun in the latter part of the 14th century and Joseon era records state that the Main Buddha Hall was renovated in 1528 during the reigns of King Yeongjo and King Sunjo.

Cradle of Seon Buddhism in Korea's Modern Era

In the late Korean Empire, Seon Master Gyeongheo lived here and taught the Seon tradition. He revived the practice and lineage tradition of Seon Buddhism, which had been discontinued in the 1880s. While residing at Sudeoksa Temple and nearby temples like Cheonjangam, Buseoksa and Gaesimsa, Ven. Gyeongheo ordained and taught disciples such as Suwol, Hyewol, Mangong and Hanam. Ven. Suwol went to Manchuria, lived the life of a secluded sage, and entered paranirvana. Ven. Hyewol went to Busan and established a lineage that transmitted the Dharma to monks Unbong Seongsu, Hyanggok Hyerim and Jinje Beobwon.

Ven. Hanam went to Woljeongsa Temple and established the Odaesan Lineage that transmitted the Dharma to monks Tanheo Taekseong, Bogyeong Huitae, and Manhwa Huichan. Ven. Mangong remained at Sudeoksa and cultivated outstanding disciples such as Bowol Seongin, Yongeum Beopcheon, Byeokcho Gyeongseon, Hyeam Hyeonmun and Gobong Gyeonguk. Thus Ven. Mangong contributed greatly to spreading the seeds of Seon Buddhism which his teacher had sown, enabling Seon Buddhism to take root far and wide.

At present, Sudeoksa Temple is home to Deoksung Chongnim, one of five major comprehensive training complexes of the Jogye Order of Korean Buddhism. Here many monks immerse themselves in study and Seon meditation. It is also the headquarters temple of the 7th religious district of the Jogye Order, and supervises 36 temples in the Naepo region of South Chungcheong Province.

== Cultural properties ==
Of all Sudeoksa Temple's cultural heritage items, foremost is its Main Buddha Hall (National Treasure No. 49). Architecturally, this hall shows stability with simple and elegant aesthetics. The multiple planes created by the brackets and walls resemble an abstract painting.

Sudeoksa Temple has five items of state-designated cultural heritage. Two of these are a Scroll Painting of Rocana Buddha (Treasure No. 1263), and Wooden Seated Sakyamuni Buddha of the Three Times (Treasure No. 1381). It also has five items of Tangible Cultural Heritage of South Chungcheong Province, and four items of Cultural Heritage Material and Registered Cultural Heritage. All in all, Sudeoksa Temple has 15 items of designated cultural heritage

At the temple one can see plaques featuring Kim Jeong-hui's calligraphy, previously hung on the Muryang-sugak Hall and Sigyeongnu Pavilion at Hwa-amsa Temple in Yesan, one of Sudeoksa Temple's branch temples. In addition, the temple has King Gongmin's geomungo, a six-string Korean lute, which was given to Master Mangong by Prince Yi Gang, the second son of King Gojong. Inscribed on it are the words “King Gongmin’s Lute (恭愍王琴),” carved by Yi Jo-muk, a renowned calligrapher and painter of the late Joseon era, and a poem by Master Mangong.

Scattered around the summit of Mt. Deoksungsan behind Sudeoksa Temple are Jeonghyesa Temple, the Seon Hall and many huts for practice. One of them is Geumseondae, which enshrines the portraits of the monks Gyeongheo, Mangong and Hyewol. Jeonwolsa Temple on the summit of Mt. Deoksungsan, is where Mangong spent his later years. Near there stands the stupa of Ven. Mangong on which is written the passage, “The whole world is a single flower.” The stupa is designated Registered Cultural Heritage No. 473.

== Tourism ==
The temple is a notable tourist destination, offering visitors a "Temple Stay Program".

== Gallery ==
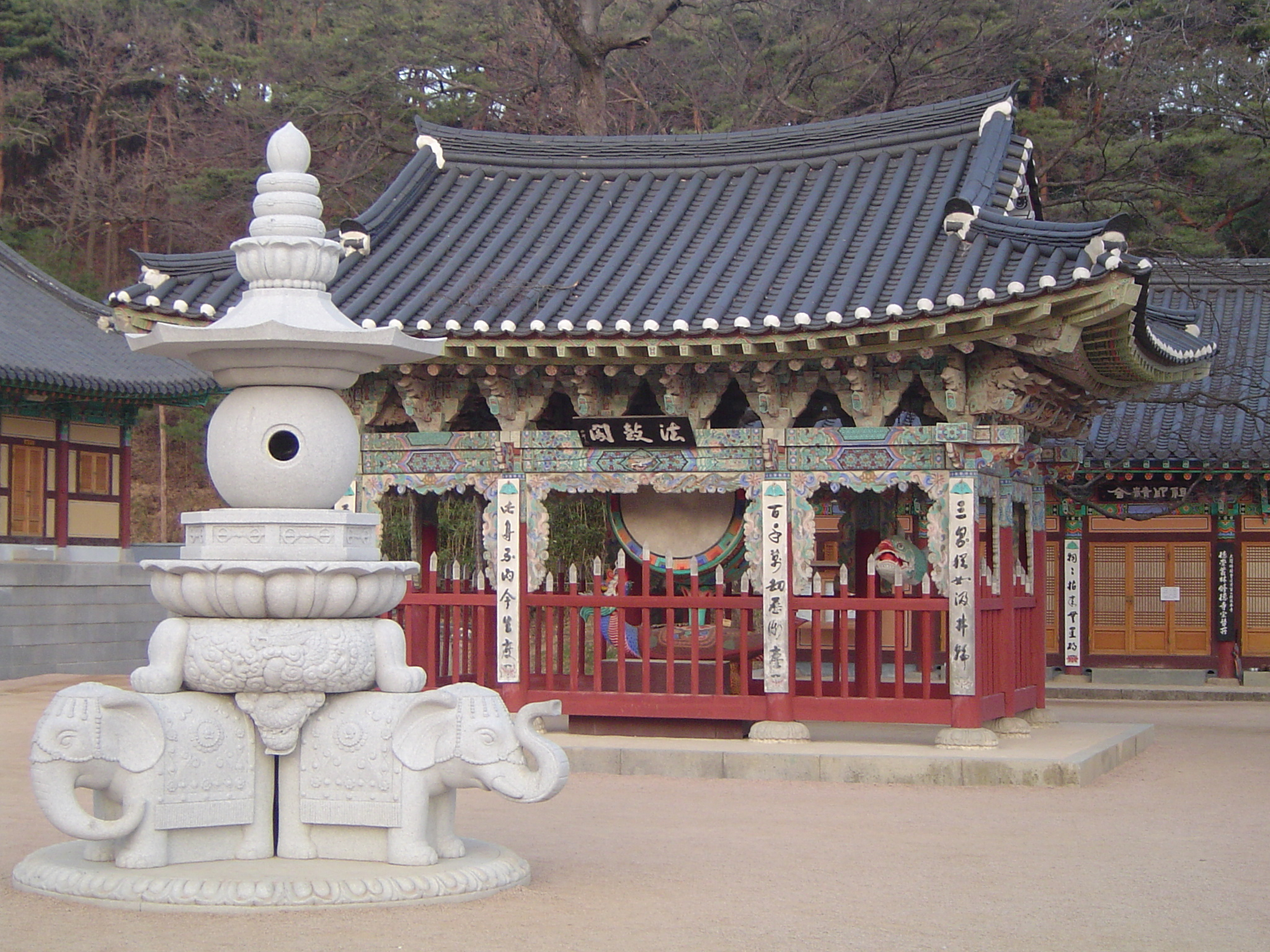

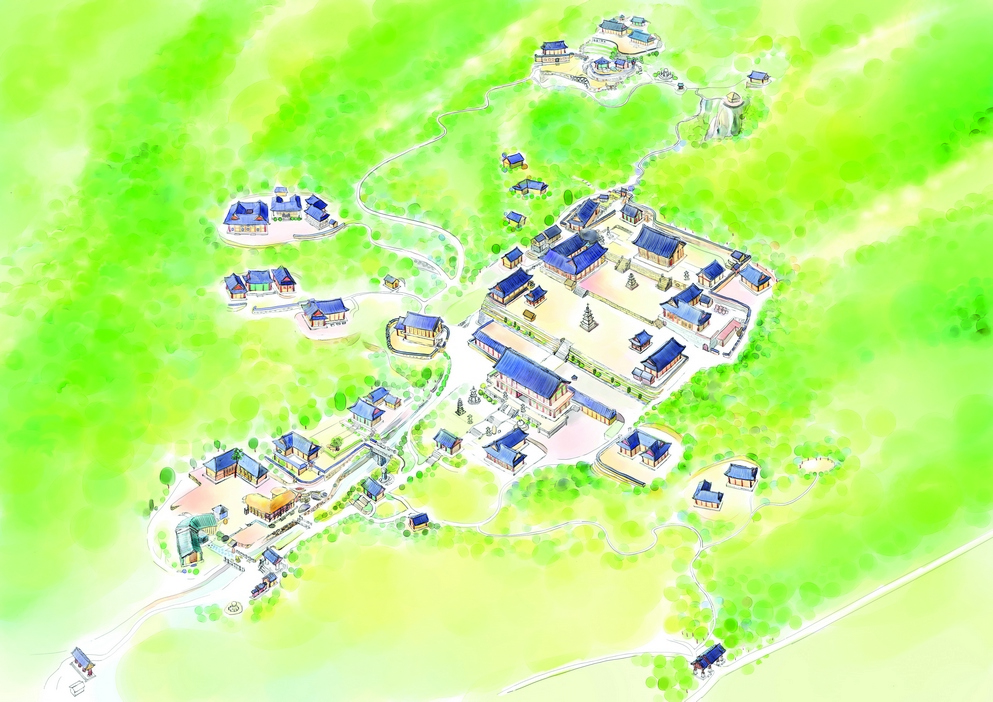

== See also ==
- Korean Buddhist temples
- Korean Buddhism
- Korean architecture
