= Jeongang =

Korean Zen master

Jeongang 전강 田岡
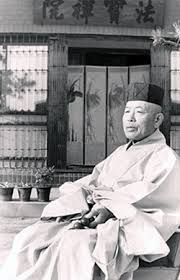
- Title: Zen Master

Personal life
- Born: Korea

Religious life
- Religion: Buddhism
- School: Seon Buddhism

The Great Zen Master Jeongang Yeongshin (Korean: 전강영신대선사, Chinese: 田岡永信大禪師); 1898 – 1975) was a Zen Master of the Jogye Order of Korean Buddhism. He used the principle of Kong-an (Korean: 공안) as a way to lead his disciples to Enlightenment.

== Career ==
Zen Master Jeongang entered the Hae In Temple monastery (해인사) to become a monk when he was 16 years old and after 7 years of intense self-training he attained Enlightenment.

At age 25, he received Dharma Transmission from Zen Master Mangong. Zen Master Jeongang later became the ‘Josil’, or supreme patriarch, of Tongdo Temple when he was 33, the youngest in the history of Korean Buddhism. These achievements at such a young age are legendary in Korean Buddhism. Later he acted as Josil in the mediation halls of many famous temples within Korea including; Beobjusa, Mangwolsa, Donghwasa, Beomeosa, Cheonchuksa, Yongjusa and Jeonggaksa.

== Dharma Transmission (Inga) ==
After receiving Dharma Transmission from Zen Master Mangong, Zen Master Jeongang’s Enlightenment was confirmed and recognized by 6 Zen Masters of the time in Korea: Masters Hyebong, Hyewol, Hanam, Geumbong, Bowol and Yongseong.

== Death (Nirvana) ==
On January 13, 1975, while giving a Dharma Lecture in the meditation hall at Yonghwa Temple, Beopbo, Zen Master Jeongang asked the audience, "What is the purpose of life and death?". When nobody answered, he said, "Hak! Even backwards, 9 times 9 is 81.At that very moment he is said to have attained Nirvana"
