= Sunim =

- Hangul: 스님
- RR: seunim
- MR: sŭnim

Seunim is the Korean title for a Buddhist monk or Buddhist nun. It is considered respectful to refer to senior monks or nuns in Korea as Kun seunim. In most Korean temples, a middle-aged monk assumes the role of a juji seunim, who serves administrative functions. The eldest seunim is typically seen as a symbolic leader of the younger seunims.

== See also ==
- Ajari
- Acharya
