= Zen =

Meditation-based school of Mahāyāna Buddhism

Chan/Seon/Zen

Chinese name
- Traditional Chinese: 禪
- Simplified Chinese: 禅
Transcriptions
Standard Mandarin
- Hanyu Pinyin: Chán
- Wade–Giles: Ch'an^{2}
- IPA: [ʈʂʰǎn]
Hakka
- Pha̍k-fa-sṳ: Sàm
Yue: Cantonese
- Jyutping: Sim^{4}
Southern Min
- Hokkien POJ: Siân
- Tâi-lô: Siân
Middle Chinese
- Middle Chinese: dʑjen

Vietnamese name
- Vietnamese alphabet: Thiền
- Chữ Hán: 禪

Korean name
- Hangul: 선
- Hanja: 禪
Transcriptions
- Revised Romanization: Seon

Japanese name
- Kanji: 禅
- Kana: ぜん
Transcriptions
- Romanization: Zen

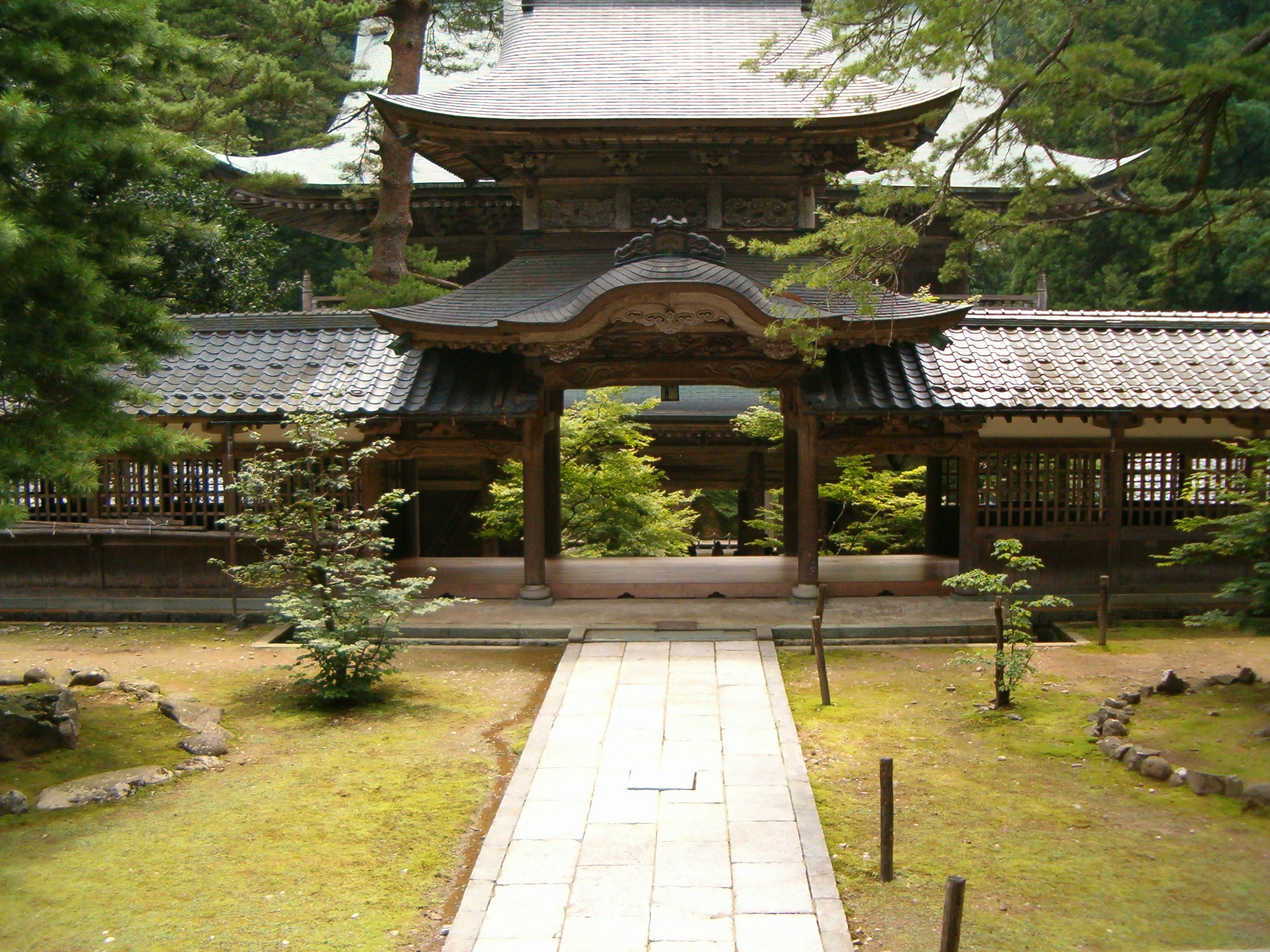
Eiheiji gate

Zen (Japanese pronunciation: [dzeꜜɴ, dzeɴ]; (Note: In this article, the English term Zen, while derived from Japanese, is used to refer to the school of Buddhism as a whole. There is a separate article specifically on Japanese Zen.) from Chinese: Chan; in Korean: Seon, and Vietnamese: Thiền) is a Mahayana Buddhist tradition that developed in China during the Tang dynasty by blending Indian Mahayana Buddhism, particularly Yogachara and Madhyamaka philosophies, with Chinese Taoist thought, especially Neo-Daoist. Zen originated as the Chan school (禪宗, Chanzōng, 'meditation school') or the Buddha-mind school (佛心宗, fóxīnzōng), and later developed into various sub-schools and branches.

Chan is traditionally believed to have been brought to China by the semi-legendary figure Bodhidharma, who was an Indian (or Central Asian) monk. From China, Chan spread south to Vietnam and became Vietnamese Thiền, northeast to Korea to become Seon Buddhism, and east to Japan, becoming Japanese Zen.

Zen emphasizes meditation practice, direct insight into one's own Buddha nature (見性, Ch. jiànxìng, Jp. kenshō), and the personal expression of this insight in daily life for the benefit of others. Some Zen sources de-emphasize doctrinal study and traditional practices, favoring direct understanding through zazen and interaction with a master (Jp: rōshi, Ch: shīfu) who may be depicted as an iconoclastic and unconventional figure. In spite of this, most Zen schools also promote traditional Buddhist practices like chanting, precepts, walking meditation, rituals, monasticism and scriptural study.

With an emphasis on Buddha-nature thought, intrinsic enlightenment and sudden awakening, Zen teaching draws from numerous Buddhist sources, including Sarvāstivāda meditation, the Mahayana teachings on the bodhisattva, Yogachara and Tathāgatagarbha texts (like the Laṅkāvatāra), and the Huayan school. The Prajñāpāramitā literature, as well as Madhyamaka thought, have also been influential in the shaping of the apophatic and sometimes iconoclastic nature of Zen rhetoric.

== Etymology ==
The word Zen is derived from the Japanese pronunciation of the Middle Chinese word 禪 (Middle Chinese: [dʑian]; pinyin: chán), which in turn is derived from the Sanskrit word dhyāna (ध्यान), which can be approximately translated as 'contemplation', 'absorption', or 'meditative state'. (Note: Dumoulin writes in his preface to Zen. A History. Part One: India and China: "Zen (Chin. Ch'an, an abbreviation of ch'an-na, which transliterates the Sanskrit Dhyāna (Devanagari: धध्यान) or its Pali cognate Jhāna (Sanskrit; Pāli धझान), terms meaning 'meditation') is the name of a Mahāyāna Buddhist school of meditation originating in China. It is characterized by the practice of meditation in the lotus position (Jpn., zazen; Chin., tso-ch'an and the use of the koan (Chin., kung-an) as well as by the enlightenment experience of satori.")

The actual Chinese term for the "Zen school" is 禪宗 (chánzōng), while "chan" just refers to the practice of meditation itself (習禪; xíchán) or the study of meditation (禪學; chánxué) though it is often used as an abbreviated form of Chanzong.

Zen is also called 佛心宗 (pinyin: fóxīnzōng, Japanese: busshin-shū), the "Buddha-mind school", from fó-xīn, 'Buddha-mind'; "this term can refer either to the (or a) Buddha's compassionate and enlightened mind, or to the originally clear and pure mind inherent in all beings to which they must awaken." (Note: Harold Stewart, "Awakening to One's True Personality": "In Buddhist terminology this all-decisive moment is known as the Awakening of the Buddha-Mind, or Bodaishin, when the third, or frontal, eye of prajna, the intellectual intuition, first opens. There are three practically synonymous terms in the Mahayana for this: Bodaishin (Sanskrit: Bodhicitta); Busshin, literally 'Buddha-Heart' of Great Compassion (Sanskrit: Tathagatagarbha, or the latent possibility of Buddhahood inherent in all beings); and Bussho (Sanskrit: Buddhata), or the Buddha-nature. Compare "Buddha's compassion, Buddha's heart", and "The term buddha-mind also functions in certain cases as a synonym for Buddhadatū (foxing) or tathagatagarbha.") Busshin may also refer to Buddhakaya, the Buddha-body, "an embodiment of awakened activity".

"Zen" is traditionally a proper noun as it usually describes a particular Buddhist sect. In more recent times, the lowercase "zen" is used when discussing a worldview or attitude that is "peaceful and calm". It was officially added to the Merriam-Webster dictionary in 2018.

== Practice ==
=== Meditation ===
The practice of meditation (Chan in Chinese and dhyāna in Sanskrit), especially sitting meditation (坐禪, pinyin: zuòchán; zazen in Japanese) is a central part of Zen Buddhism.

==== Meditation in Chinese Buddhism ====
The practice of Buddhist meditation originated in India and first entered China through the translations of An Shigao (fl. c. 148–180 CE), and Kumārajīva (334–413 CE). Both of these figures translated various Dhyāna sutras. These were influential meditation texts which were mostly based on the meditation teachings of the Kashmiri Sarvāstivāda school (c. 1st–4th centuries CE). Among the most influential early Chinese meditation texts are the Anban Shouyi Jing (安般守意經, a sutra on ānāpānasmṛti), the Zuochan Sanmei Jing (坐禪三昧經, a sutra on sitting dhyāna-samādhi) and the Damoduoluo Chan Jing (達摩多羅禪經, Dharmatrāta dhyāna sutra).

These early Chinese meditation works continued to exert influence on Zen practice well into the modern era. For example, the 18th-century Rinzai Zen master Tōrei Enji wrote a commentary on the Damoduoluo Chan Jing and used the Zuochan Sanmei Jing as a source in the writing of this commentary. Tōrei Enji believed that the Damoduoluo Chan Jing had been authored by Bodhidharma.

While dhyāna in a strict sense refers to the classic four dhyānas, in Chinese Buddhism, Chan may refer to various kinds of meditation techniques and their preparatory practices, which are necessary to practice dhyāna. The five main types of meditation in the Dhyāna sutras are ānāpānasmṛti (mindfulness of breathing); paṭikūlamanasikāra meditation (mindfulness of the impurities of the body); maitrī (loving-kindness) meditation; the contemplation on the twelve links of pratītyasamutpāda; and contemplation on the Buddha. According to the modern Chan master Sheng-yen, these practices are termed the "five methods for stilling or pacifying the mind" and serve to focus and purify the mind, and support the development of the stages of dhyana. Chan Buddhists may also use other classic Buddhist practices like the four foundations of mindfulness and the Three Gates of Liberation (śūnyatā or emptiness, signlessness or animitta, and wishlessness or apraṇihita).

Early Chan texts also teach forms of meditation that are unique to Mahāyāna Buddhism. For example, the Treatise on the Essentials of Cultivating the Mind, which depicts the teachings of the 7th-century East Mountain Teaching, teaches a visualization of a sun disk, similar to that taught in the Contemplation Sutra.

According to Charles Luk, there was no single fixed method in early Chan (Zen). All the various Buddhist meditation methods were simply skillful means that could lead a meditator to the Buddha-mind within.

==== Zen's sudden approach ====
Modern scholars like Robert Sharf argue that early Chan, while having unique teachings and myths, also drew on classic Buddhist meditation methods, which is why it is hard to find many uniquely "Chan" meditation instructions in some of the earliest sources. However, Sharf also notes there was a unique kind of Chan meditation taught in some early sources, which also tends to deprecate the traditional Buddhist meditations. This uniquely Zen approach goes by various names like "maintaining mind" (shouxin 守心), "maintaining unity" (shouyi 守一), "discerning the mind" (guanxin 觀心), "viewing the mind" (kanxin 看心), and "pacifying the mind" (anxin 安心). (Note: An early Chan critique of the notion of "pacifying the mind" can be found in the Oxhead School text, the Jueguan lun: "What is the mind? What is it to pacify the mind (an-hsin 安心)?" [The master] answered: "You should not posit a mind, nor should you attempt to pacify it—this may be called 'pacified.'") A traditional phrase that describes this practice states that "Chan points directly to the human mind, to enable people to see their true nature and become Buddhas."

According to McRae the "first explicit statement of the sudden and direct approach that was to become the hallmark of Ch'an religious practice" is associated with the East Mountain School. It is a method named "maintaining the one without wavering" (守一不移, shǒu yī bù yí), the one being the true nature of mind or Suchness, which is equated with Buddha-nature. (Note: Sharf observes that "maintaining the one" or "guarding the one" (shou yi, 守一) fell out of favor with the eclipse of the Northern School. Evidence of this can be seen in the Xinxin Ming, for example: "If there is even a trace of 'is' or 'is not,' the mind will be lost in confusion. Although the two comes from the One, do not guard even this One." Other sources explicitly reject the notion of "maintaining" or "preserving" (shou 守). See for example the Xin Ming (not to be confused with the Xinxin Ming): "Bodhi exists originally It has no need of being preserved Afflictions have no intrinsic existence They do not need to be eradicated Numinous knowing is self-illuminated The myriad dharmas return to Thusness There is no return, no receiving Cut off contemplation, forget preservation") Sharf writes that in this practice, one turns the attention from the objects of experience to "the nature of conscious awareness itself", the innately pure Buddha-nature, which was compared to a clear mirror or to the sun (which is always shining but may be covered by clouds). This type of meditation is based on classic Mahāyāna ideas, which are not uniquely "Chan", but according to McRae, it differs from traditional practice in that "no preparatory requirements, no moral prerequisites or preliminary exercises are given," and is "without steps or gradations. One concentrates, understands, and is enlightened, all in one undifferentiated practice." (Note: It first appears in a Chinese text named the Ju-tao an-hsin yao-fang-pien fa-men (JTFM, Instructions on essential expedients for calming the mind and accessing the path), itself a part of the Leng Ch'ieh Shih Tzu Chi (Records of the Masters of the Lankavatara). The Records of the Masters of the Lankavatara is associated with the early Chan tradition known as the "East Mountain School" and has been dated to around 713.)

Zen sources also use the term "tracing back the radiance" or "turning one's light around" (Ch. fǎn zhào, 返照) to describe seeing the inherent radiant source of the mind itself, the "numinous awareness", luminosity, or Buddha-nature. The Platform Sutra mentions this term and connects it with seeing one's "original face". The Record of Linji states that all that is needed to obtain the Dharma is to "turn your own light in upon yourselves and never seek elsewhere". The Japanese Zen master Dōgen describes it as follows: "You should stop the intellectual practice of pursuing words and learn the 'stepping back' of 'turning the light around and shining back' (Jp: ekō henshō); mind and body will naturally 'drop off,' and the 'original face' will appear." Similarly, the Korean Seon master Yŏndam Yuil states: "to use one's own mind to trace the radiance back to the numinous awareness of one's own mind...It is like seeing the radiance of the sun's rays and following it back until you see the orb of the sun itself."

Sharf also notes that the early notion of contemplating a pure Buddha "Mind" was tempered and balanced by other Zen sources with terms like "no-mind" (wuxin), and "no-mindfulness" (wunian), to avoid any metaphysical reification of mind, and any clinging to mind or language. This kind of negative Madhyamaka style dialectic is found in early Zen sources like the Treatise on No Mind (Wuxin lun 無心論) of the Oxhead School and the Platform Sutra. These sources tend to emphasize emptiness, negation, and absence (wusuo 無所) as the main theme of contemplation. These two contemplative themes (the Buddha mind and no-mind, positive and negative rhetoric) continued to shape the development of Zen theory and practice throughout its history.

Later Chinese Chan Buddhists developed their own meditation ("chan") manuals, which taught their unique method of direct and sudden contemplation. The earliest of these is the widely imitated and influential Zuochan Yí (c. turn of the 12th century), which recommends a simple contemplative practice that is said to lead to the discovery of inherent wisdom already present in the mind. This work also shows the influence of the earlier meditation manuals composed by Tiantai patriarch Zhiyi.

However, other Zen sources de-emphasize traditional practices like sitting meditation, and instead focus on effortlessness and on ordinary daily activities. One example of this is found in the Record of Linji which states: "Followers of the Way, as to Buddhadharma, no effort is necessary. You have only to be ordinary, with nothing to do—defecating, urinating, wearing clothes, eating food, and lying down when tired." Having no concerns or nothing-to-do (wushi 無事) also appears in other Zen sources as well. For example, Chan master Huangbo states that nothing compares with non-seeking, describing the Zen adept as follows: "the person of the Way is the one who has nothing to do [wu-shih], who has no mind at all and no doctrine to preach. Having nothing to do, such a person lives at ease."

John McRae notes that a major development in early Ch'an was the rejection of traditional meditation techniques in favor of a uniquely Zen direct approach. Early Chan sources like the Long Scroll (dubbed the Bodhidharma Anthology by Jeffrey Broughton), (Note: The original title of the Long Scroll, the earliest extant Chan text, is unknown. Although it has been called the Long Scroll of the Treatise on the Two Entrances and Four Practices, John Jorgensen writes in his thesis on this text, "I have titled it the Long Scroll rather than the Erh-ju ssu-hsing lun [Treatise on the Two Entrances and Four Practices] or Ta-mo lun because these latter titles are confusing and ill-defined.") the Platform Sutra and the works of Shenhui question such things as mindfulness and concentration, and instead state that insight can be attained directly and suddenly. For example, Record I of the Long Scroll states: "The man of sharp abilities hears of the path without producing a covetous mind. He does not even produce right mindfulness and right reflection," and the iconoclastic Master Yüan states in Record III of the same text, "If mind is not produced, what need is there for cross-legged sitting dhyana?" Similarly, the Platform Sutra criticizes the practice of sitting samādhi: "One is enlightened to the Way through the mind. How could it depend on sitting?", while Shenhui's four pronouncements criticize the "freezing", "stopping", "activating", and "concentrating" of the mind.

Zen sources that focus on the sudden teaching can sometimes be quite radical in their rejection of the importance of traditional Buddhist ideas and practices. The Record of the Dharma-Jewel Through the Ages (Lidai Fabao Ji), for example, states, "better that one should destroy śīla [ethics], and not destroy true seeing. Śīla [causes] rebirth in Heaven, adding more [karmic] bonds, while true seeing attains nirvāṇa." Similarly the Bloodstream Sermon states that it doesn't matter whether one is a butcher or not, if one sees one's true nature, then one will not be affected by karma. The Bloodstream Sermon also rejects the worship of Buddhas and bodhisattvas, stating that "Those who hold onto appearances are devils. They fall from the Path. Why worship illusions born of the mind? Those who worship don't know, and those who know don't worship." Similarly, in the Lidai Fabao Ji, Wuzhu states that "No-thought is none other than seeing the Buddha" and rejects the practice of worship and recitation. Most famously, the Record of Linji has the master state that "if you meet a Buddha, kill the Buddha" (as well as patriarchs, arhats, parents, and kinfolk), further claiming that through this "you will gain emancipation, will not be entangled with things."

=== Common contemporary meditation forms ===
Robert Sharf argues that seated meditation was not nearly as important to historical Zen monastery life as people often think today. For many Zen priests in Japan, everyday religious life does not include regular practice of zazen and consists mostly of rituals, religious services, funerals, and the practical running of temples. Robert Sharf also argues that there is little evidence that early Chan communities had a special set of meditation techniques of their own. Their practices mostly matched those found elsewhere in Buddhism. More clearly unique practices emerged later, particularly with the development of kanhua, or koan contemplation, during the Song dynasty.

==== Mindfulness of breathing ====
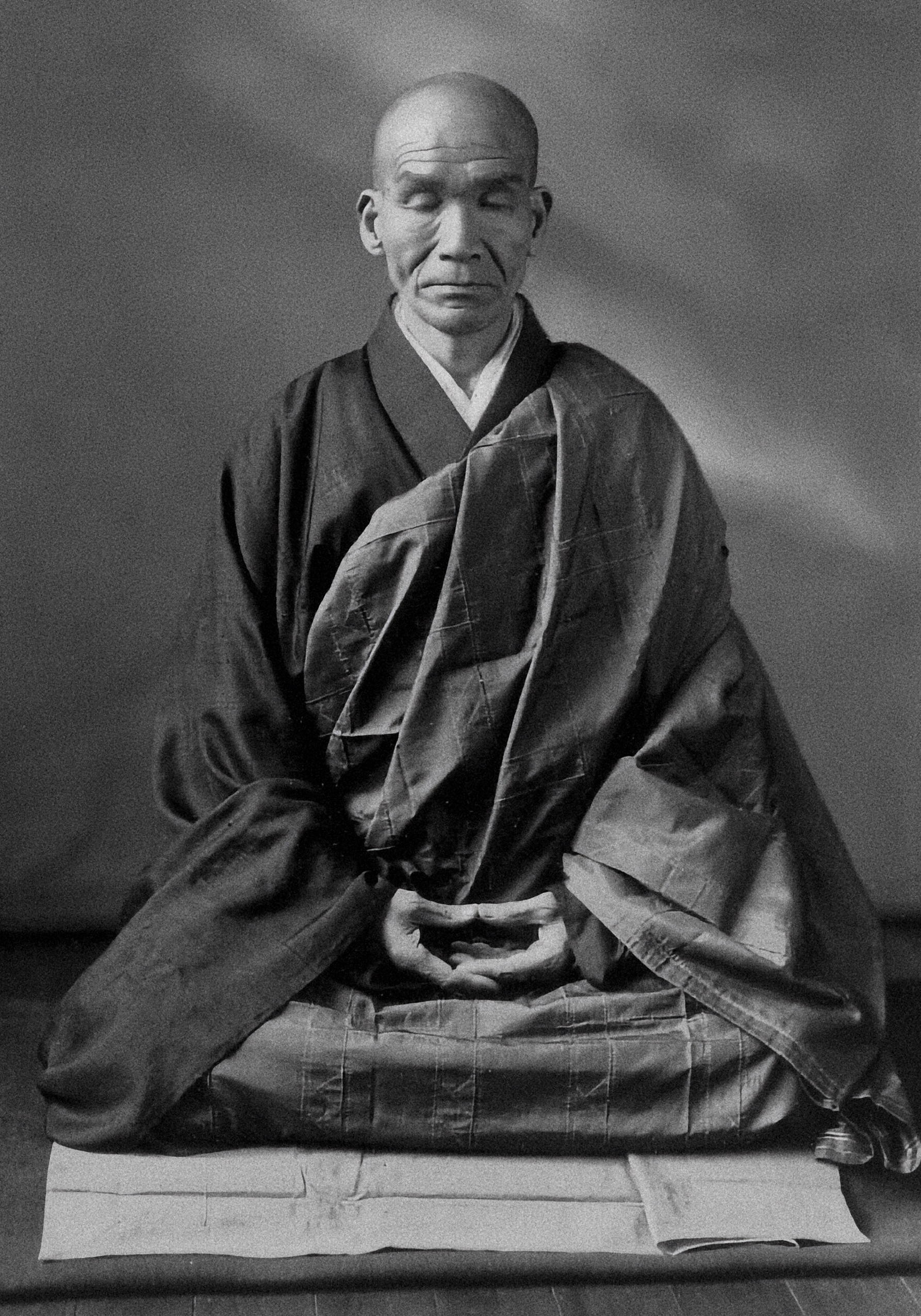
Kodo Sawaki practicing zazen, his hands make the "cosmic mudra" (Jp: hokkai jōin 法界定印), which is common in Japanese Soto Zen

During sitting meditation (坐禅, Ch. zuochan, Jp. zazen, Ko. jwaseon), practitioners usually assume a sitting position such as the lotus position, half-lotus, Burmese, or seiza. Their hands are often placed in a specific gesture or mudrā. Often, a square or round cushion placed on a padded mat is used to sit on; in some other cases, a chair may be used.

To regulate the mind, Zen students are often directed towards counting breaths. Either both exhalations and inhalations are counted, or only one of them. The count can be up to ten, and then this process is repeated until the mind is calmed. Zen teachers like Omori Sogen teach a series of long and deep exhalations and inhalations as a way to prepare for regular breath meditation. Attention is often placed on the energy center (dantian) below the navel. (Note: The Japanese Rinzai master Takuan Sōhō was critical of the practice of placing the mind below the navel (at the hara/tanden) in concentration. He said, "...viewed from the highest standpoint of Buddhism, putting the mind just below the navel and not allowing it to wander is a low level of understanding, not a high one. [...] If you consider putting your mind below your navel and not letting it wander, your mind will be taken by the mind that thinks of this plan. You will have no ability to move ahead and will be exceptionally unfree.") Zen teachers often promote diaphragmatic breathing, stating that the breath must come from the lower abdomen (known as hara or tanden in Japanese), and that this part of the body should expand forward slightly as one breathes. Over time, the breathing should become smoother, deeper, and slower. When the counting becomes an encumbrance, the practice of simply following the natural rhythm of breathing with concentrated attention is recommended. While some teachers such as Dainin Katagiri Roshi taught watching the breath, and Shunryū Suzuki taught counting the breath, others such as Kōshō Uchiyama and Shohaku Okumura taught neither counting nor watching the breath. (Note: Similarly, according to the famous East Asian śāstra, the Awakening of Faith, one does not concentrate on the breath: "Should there be a person who desires to practice 'cessation', he should stay in a quiet place and sit erect in an even temper. [His attention should be focused] neither on breathing nor on any form or color, nor on empty space, earth, water, fire, wind, nor even on what has been seen, heard, remembered, or conceived.")

==== Silent illumination and Shikantaza ====
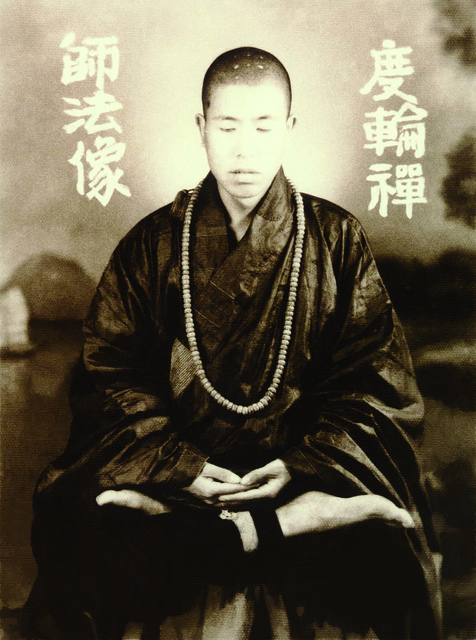
Venerable Hsuan Hua meditating in the lotus position, Hong Kong, 1953

A common form of sitting meditation is called "Silent illumination" (Ch. mòzhào 默照, Jp. mokushō). This practice was traditionally promoted by the Caodong school of Chinese Chan and is associated with Hongzhi Zhengjue (1091–1157), who wrote various works on the practice. This method derives from the Indian Buddhist practice of the union (Skt. yuganaddha) of śamatha and vipaśyanā.

Hongzhi's practice of silent illumination does not depend on concentration on particular objects, "such as visual images, sounds, breathing, concepts, stories, or deities." Instead, it is a non-dual "objectless" meditation, involving "withdrawal from exclusive focus on a particular sensory or mental object." This practice allows the meditator to be aware of "all phenomena as a unified totality," without any conceptualizing, grasping, goal seeking, or subject-object duality. According to Leighton, this method "rests on the faith, verified in experience, that the field of vast brightness is ours from the outset." This "vast luminous Buddha field" is our immanent "inalienable endowment of wisdom" which cannot be cultivated or enhanced. Instead, one just has to recognize this radiant clarity without any interference.

A similar practice is taught in the major schools of Japanese Zen, but is especially emphasized by Sōtō, where it is more widely known as shikantaza (Ch. zhǐguǎn dǎzuò, "just sitting"). For instance, the modern Sōtō Zen teacher Shohaku Okumura says: "We don’t set our mind on any particular object, visualization, mantra, or even our breath itself. When we just sit, our mind is nowhere and everywhere." This method is discussed in the works of the Japanese Sōtō Zen thinker Dōgen, especially in his Shōbōgenzō and his Fukanzazengi. For Dōgen, shikantaza is characterized by hishiryō ("non-thinking", "without thinking", "beyond thinking"), which according to Kasulis is "a state of no-mind in which one is simply aware of things as they are, beyond thinking and not-thinking".

While the Japanese and the Chinese forms of these simple methods are similar, they are considered distinct approaches.

==== Huatou and Kōan Contemplation ====
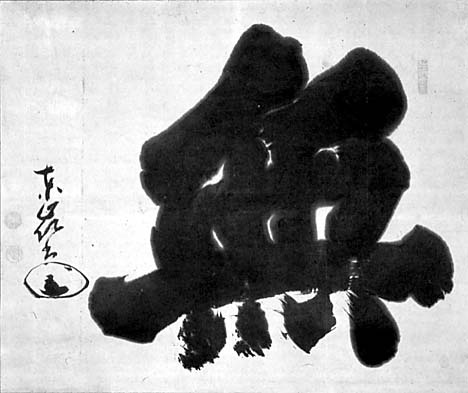
Calligraphy of "Mu" (Hanyu Pinyin: wú) by Torei Enji. It figures in the famous Zhaozhou's dog kōan

During the Song dynasty, gōng'àn (Jp. kōan) literature became popular. Literally meaning "public case", they were stories or dialogues describing teachings and interactions between Zen masters and their students. Kōans are meant to illustrate Zen's non-conceptual insight (prajña). During the Song, a new meditation method was developed by Linji school figures such as Dahui (1089–1163) called kanhua chan ("observing the phrase" meditation), which referred to contemplation on a single word or phrase (called the huatou, "critical phrase") of a gōng'àn. Dahui famously criticised Caodong's "silent illumination." While the two methods of Caodong and Linji are sometimes seen as competing with each other, Schlütter writes that Dahui himself "did not completely condemn quiet-sitting; in fact, he seems to have recommended it, at least to his monastic disciples."

In Chinese Chan and Korean Seon, the practice of "observing the huatou" (hwadu in Korean) is widely practiced. It was taught by Seon masters like Chinul (1158–1210) and Seongcheol (1912–1993), and modern Chinese masters like Sheng Yen and Xuyun.

In the Japanese Rinzai school, kōan introspection developed its own formalized style, with a standardized curriculum of kōans that must be studied, meditated on, and "passed" in sequence. Monks are instructed to "become one" with their koan by repeating the koan's key phrase constantly. They are also advised not to attempt to answer it intellectually, since the goal of the practice is a non-conceptual insight into non-duality. The Zen student's mastery of a given kōan is presented to the teacher in a private interview (referred to in Japanese as dokusan, daisan, or sanzen). The process includes standardized answers, "checking questions" (sassho 拶所), and common sets of "capping phrase" (jakugo) for poetry, all of which must be memorized by students. While there are standardized answers to a kōan, practitioners are also expected to demonstrate their spiritual understanding through their responses. The teacher may approve or disapprove of the answer based on the student's behavior and guide the student in the right direction. According to Hori, the traditional Japanese Rinzai koan curriculum can take 15 years to complete for a full-time monk. The interaction with a teacher is often presented as central in Zen, but the asymmetry of that relationship also makes Zen practice vulnerable to misunderstanding and exploitation.

Kōan-inquiry may be practiced during zazen (sitting meditation), kinhin (walking meditation), and throughout all the activities of daily life. The goal of the practice is often termed kensho (seeing one's true nature), and is to be followed by further practice to attain a natural, effortless, down-to-earth state of being, the "ultimate liberation", "knowing without any kind of defilement". This style of kōan practice is particularly emphasized in modern Rinzai, but it also occurs in other schools or branches of Zen depending on the teaching line.

In the Caodong and Sōtō traditions, koans were studied and commented on; for example, Hongzhi published a collection of koans, and Dogen discussed koans extensively. However, they were not traditionally used in sitting meditation. Some Zen masters have also critiqued the practice of using koans for meditation. According to Haskel, Bankei called kōans "old wastepaper" and saw the kōan method as hopelessly contrived. Similarly, the Song era master Foyan Qingyuan (1067–1120) was critical of the use of koans (public cases) and similar stories, arguing that they did not exist during the time of Bodhidharma. He said, "In other places they like to have people look at model case stories, but here we have the model case story of what is presently coming into being; you should look at it, but no one can make you see all the way through such an immense affair."

==== Nianfo Chan ====
Nianfo (Jp. nembutsu, from Skt. buddhānusmṛti "recollection of the Buddha") refers to the recitation of the Buddha's name, in most cases the Buddha Amitabha. In Chinese Chan, the Pure Land practice of nianfo based on the phrase Nāmó Āmítuófó (Homage to Amitabha) is a widely practiced form of Zen meditation which came to be known as "Nianfo Chan" (念佛禪). Nianfo was practiced and taught by early Chan masters, like Daoxin (580-651), who taught that one should "bind the mind to one Buddha and exclusively invoke his name". The practice is also taught in Shenxiu's Guanxin lun (觀心論). Likewise, the Chuan fabao qi (傳法寶紀, Taisho # 2838, ca. 713), one of the earliest Chan histories, shows this practice was widespread in the early Chan generation of Hongren, Faru and Dadong who are said to have "invoked the name of the Buddha so as to purify the mind."

Evidence for the practice of nianfo chan can also be found in Changlu Zongze's (died c. 1107) Chanyuan qinggui (The Rules of Purity in the Chan Monastery), perhaps the most influential Chan monastic code in East Asia. Nianfo continued to be taught as a form of Chan meditation by later Chinese figures such as Yongming Yanshou, Zhongfen Mingben, and Tianru Weize. During the late Ming, the tradition of Nianfo Chan meditation was continued by figures such as Yunqi Zhuhong and Hanshan Deqing. Chan figures like Yongming Yanshou generally advocated a view called "mind-only Pure Land" (wei-hsin ching-t’u), which held that the Buddha and the Pure Land are just the mind.

The practice of nianfo, as well as its adaptation into the "nembutsu kōan" ('who is reciting?') is a major practice in the Japanese Ōbaku school of Zen. The recitation of a Buddha's name was also practiced in the Soto school at different times throughout its history. During the Meiji period, for example, both Shaka nembutsu (reciting the name of Shakyamuni Buddha: namu Shakamuni Butsu) and Amida nembutsu were promoted by Soto school priests as easy practices for laypersons.

Nianfo Chan is also widely practiced in Vietnamese Thien.

=== Bodhisattva virtues and vows ===
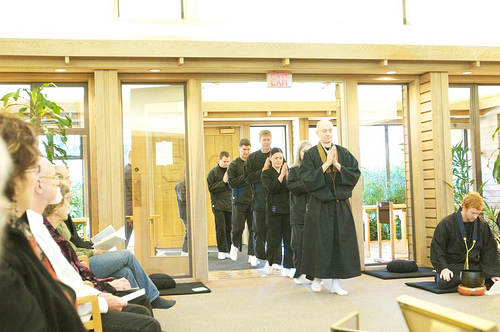
Victoria Zen Centre Jukai ceremony, January 2009

Since Zen is a form of Mahayana Buddhism, it is grounded on the schema of the bodhisattva path, which is based on the practice of the "transcendent virtues" or "perfections" (Skt. pāramitā, Ch. bōluómì, Jp. baramitsu) as well as the taking of the bodhisattva vows. The most widely used list of six virtues is: generosity, moral training (incl. five precepts), patient endurance, energy or effort, meditation (dhyana), wisdom. An important source for these teachings is the Avatamsaka sutra, which also outlines the grounds (bhumis) or levels of the bodhisattva path. The pāramitās are mentioned in early Chan works such as Bodhidharma's Two entrances and four practices and are seen as an important part of gradual cultivation (jianxiu) by later Chan figures like Zongmi.

An important element of this practice is the formal and ceremonial taking of refuge in the three jewels, bodhisattva vows, and precepts. Various sets of precepts are taken in Zen, including the five precepts, "ten essential precepts", and the sixteen bodhisattva precepts. This is commonly done in an initiation ritual (Ch. shòu jiè 受戒, Jp. Jukai, Ko. sugye, "receiving the precepts"), which is also undertaken by lay followers and marks a layperson as a formal Buddhist.

The Chinese Buddhist practice of fasting (zhai), especially during the uposatha days (Ch. zhairi, "days of fasting"), can also be an element of Chan training. Chan masters may go on extended absolute fasts, as exemplified by master Hsuan Hua's 35-day fast, which he undertook during the Cuban Missile Crisis for the generation of merit.

=== Monasticism ===
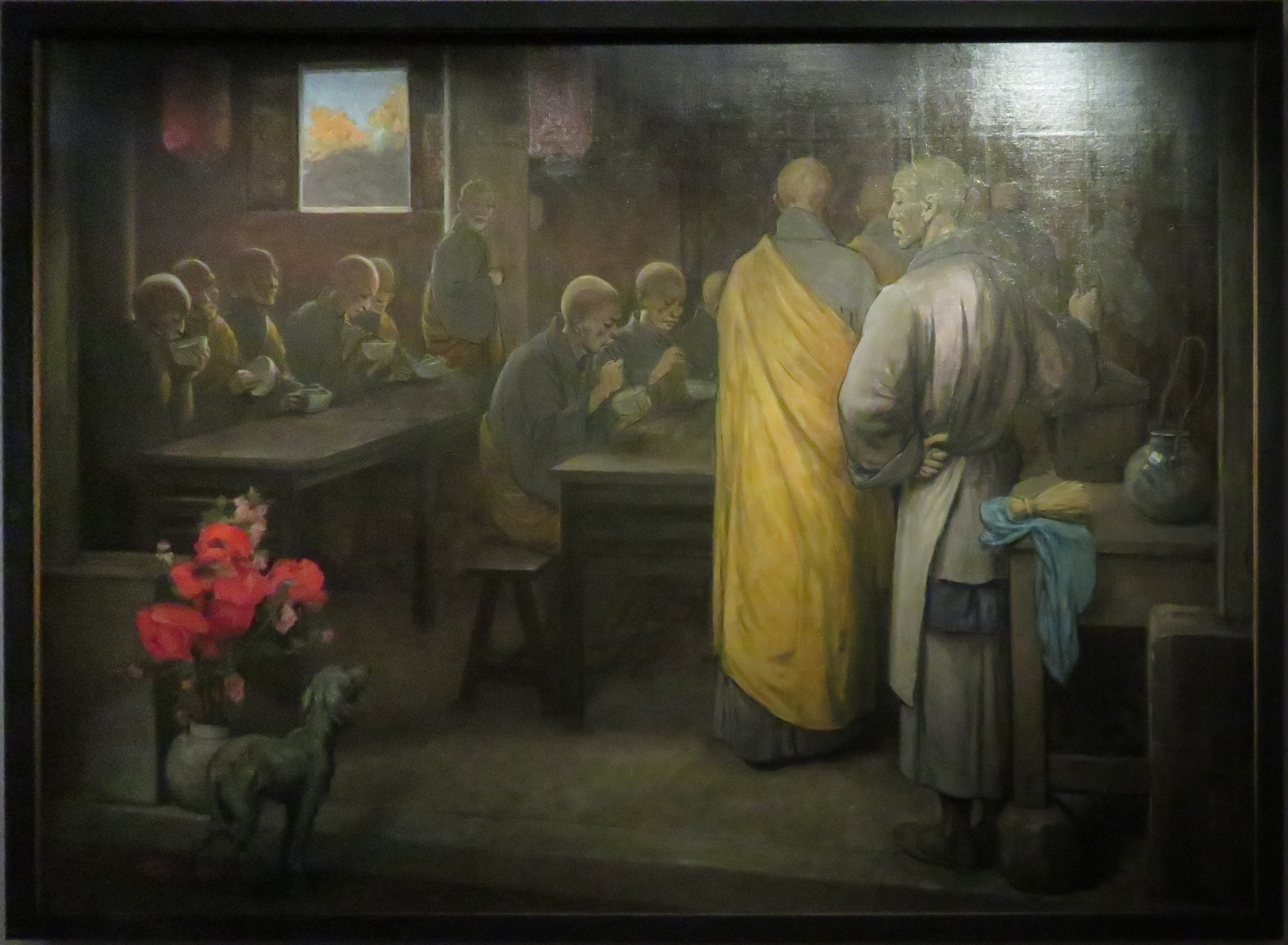
Bonzes dans un réfectoire à Canton (Monastics in a Cantonese dining hall), Félix Régamey, c. before 1888

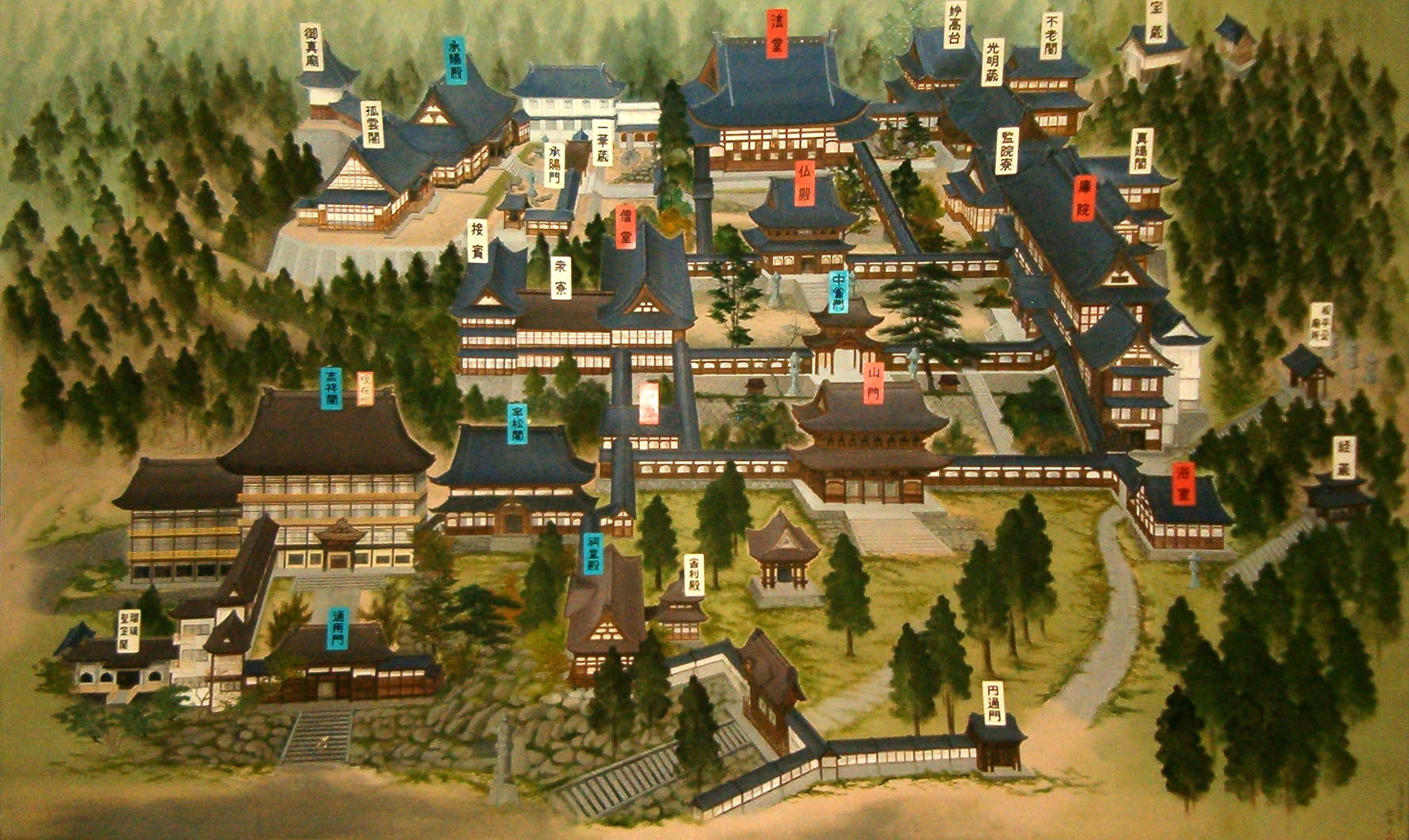
Traditional map of Soto head temple Eihei-ji

Zen developed in a Buddhist monastic context and throughout its history, most Zen masters have been Buddhist monastics (bhiksus) ordained in the Buddhist monastic code (Vinaya) living in Buddhist monasteries. East Asian Buddhist monasticism differs in various respects from traditional Buddhist monasticism, however, emphasizing self-sufficiency. For example, Zen monks do not live by begging; they store and cook their own food in the monastery and may even farm and grow their own.

Zen Monastics in Japan are particularly exceptional in the Buddhist tradition because the monks and nuns can marry after receiving their ordination. This is because they follow the practice of ordaining under the bodhisattva vows instead of the traditional monastic Vinaya.

Zen monasteries (伽藍, pinyin: qiélán, Jp: garan, Skt. saṃghārāma) will often rely on Zen monastic codes like the Rules of Purity in the Chan Monastery and Dogen's Pure Standards for the Zen Community (Eihei Shingi) which regulate life and behavior in the monastery. Zen monasteries often have a specific building or hall for meditation, the zendō (禅堂, Chinese: Chantáng), as well as a "Buddha hall" (佛殿, Ch:, Jp: butsuden) used for ritual purposes which houses the "main object of veneration" (本尊, Ch: běnzūn, Jp: honzon), usually a Buddha image. Life in a Zen monastery is often guided by a daily schedule which includes periods of work, group meditation, rituals, and formal meals.

=== Intensive group practice ===
Serious Zen practitioners may practice intensive group meditation. In Japanese, this practice is called sesshin. While the daily routine may require monks to meditate for several hours, during the intensive period, they devote themselves almost exclusively to Zen practice. The numerous 30–50 minute long sitting meditation (zazen) periods are interwoven with rest breaks, ritualized formal meals (Jp. oryoki), and short periods of work (Jp. samu) that are to be performed with the same state of mindfulness. In modern Buddhist practice in Japan, Taiwan, and the West, lay students often attend these intensive practice sessions or retreats. These are held at many Zen centers or temples.

=== Chanting and rituals ===
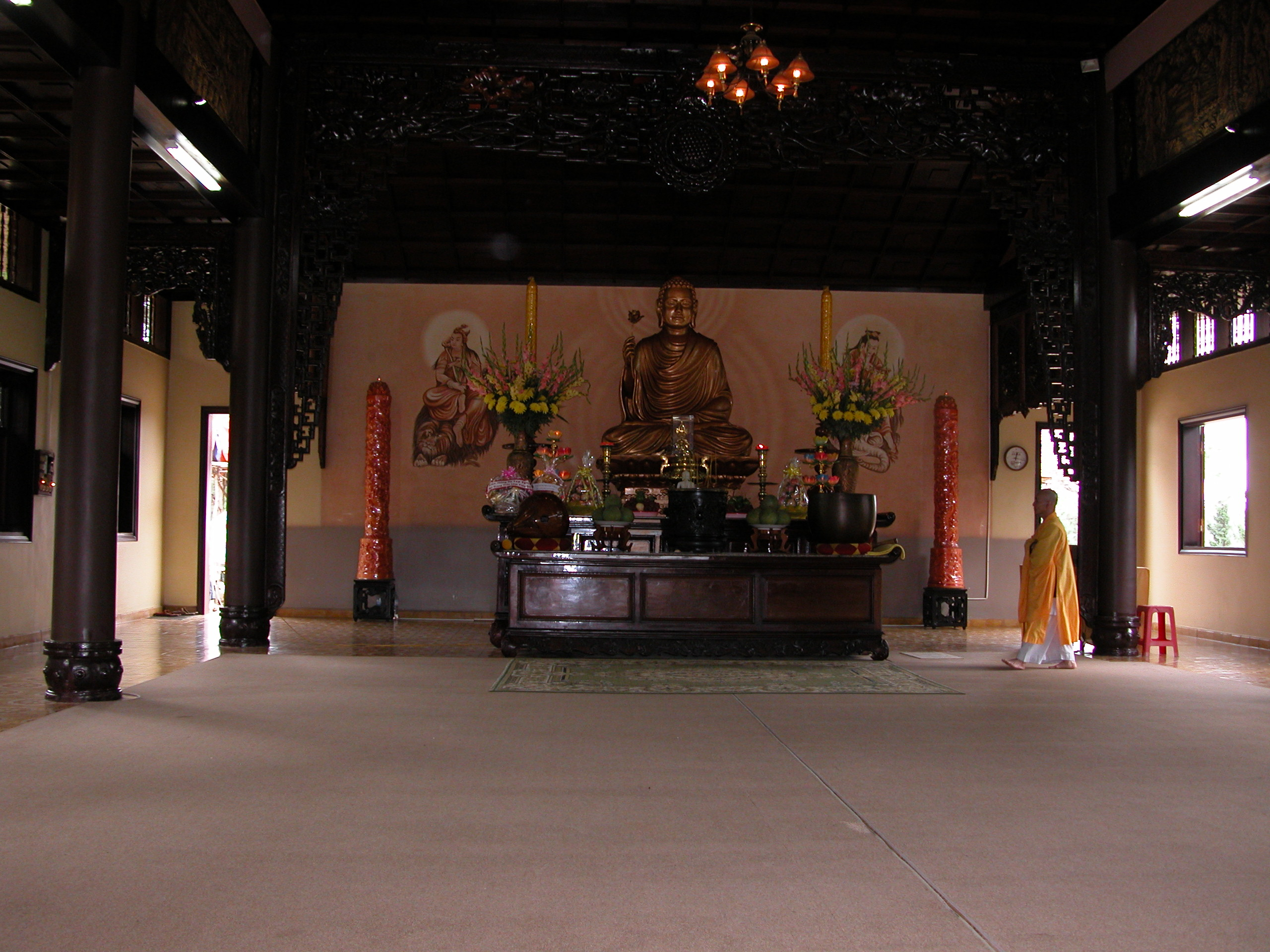
Buddha hall at Trúc Lâm Monastery of Da Lat

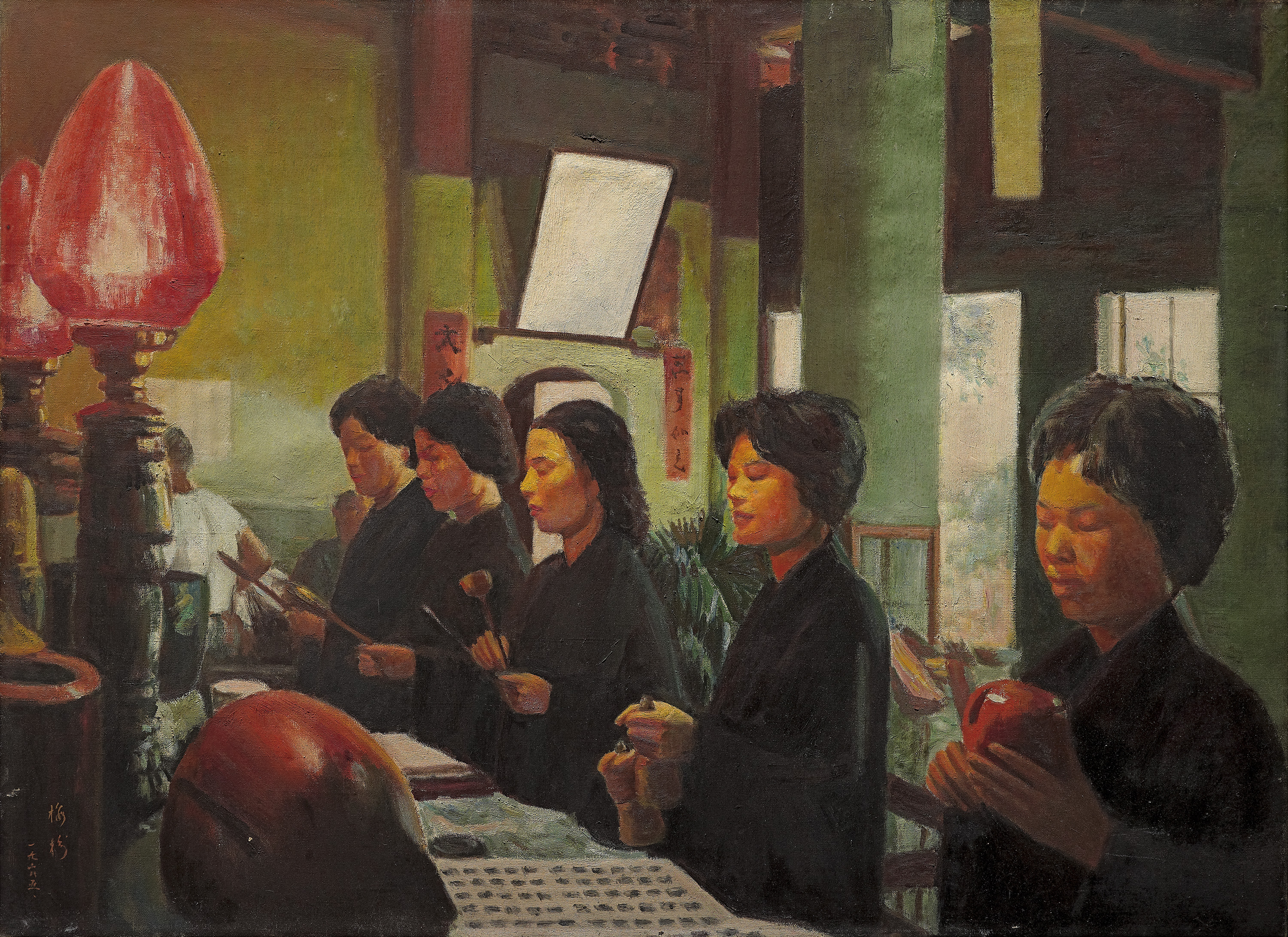
Chanting the Buddhist Scriptures, by Taiwanese painter Li Mei-shu

Monks chanting the "Heart Sutra" in Sōji-ji Temple in Yokohama, Japan

Most Zen monasteries, temples, and centers perform various rituals, services, and ceremonies (such as initiation ceremonies and funerals), which are always accompanied by the chanting of verses, poems, or sutras. There are also ceremonies that are specifically for the purpose of sutra recitation (Ch. niansong, Jp. nenju) itself. Zen schools may have an official sutra book that collects these writings (in Japanese, these are called kyohon). Practitioners may chant major Mahayana sutras such as the Heart Sutra and chapter 25 of the Lotus Sutra (often called the "Avalokiteśvara Sutra"). Dhāraṇīs and Zen poems may also be part of a Zen temple liturgy, including texts like the Song of the Precious Mirror Samadhi, the Cantongqi/Sandokai, the Nīlakaṇṭha Dhāraṇī, and the Uṣṇīṣa Vijaya Dhāraṇī Sūtra.

The butsudan is the altar in a monastery, temple, or a lay person's home, where offerings are made to the images of the Buddha, bodhisattvas, and deceased family members and ancestors. Rituals usually center on major Buddhas or bodhisattvas like Avalokiteśvara (see Guanyin), Kṣitigarbha and Manjushri. An important element in Zen ritual practice is the performance of ritual prostrations (Jp. raihai) or bows, usually done in front of a butsudan.

A widely practiced ritual in Chan Buddhism is the tantric Yujia Yankou rite, aimed at facilitating the spiritual nourishment of all sentient beings. The Chinese holiday of the Ghost Festival might also be celebrated with similar rituals for the dead. Funerals are also an important ritual and are a common point of contact between Zen monastics and the laity. Statistics published by the Sōtō school state that 80 percent of Sōtō laypeople visit their temple only for funerals and other death-related matters. Seventeen percent visit for spiritual reasons, and 3 percent visit a Zen priest at a time of personal trouble or crisis.

Another important type of ritual practiced in Zen is various repentance or confession rituals (懺悔, Ch. Chànhǔi, Jp. Zange) that were widely practiced in all forms of Chinese Mahayana Buddhism. Some popular examples of such a ritual in Chan Buddhism is the Dabei Chan, composed by the Tiantai Patriarch Siming Zhili, and the Jewelled Repentance of the Emperor of Liang, composed by the Chan master Baozhi. Dogen also wrote a treatise on repentance, which is included in the modern compilation known as the Shushogi.

Other rituals could include rites to local deities (kami in Japan) and ceremonies on Buddhist holidays such as Buddha's Birthday. Another popular form of ritual in Japanese Zen is Mizuko kuyō (Water child) ceremonies, which are performed for those who have had a miscarriage, stillbirth, or abortion. These ceremonies are also performed in American Zen Buddhism.

=== Esoteric practices ===
Depending on the tradition, esoteric methods such as mantra and dhāraṇī may also be used for different purposes, including meditation practice, protection from evil, invoking great compassion, invoking the power of certain bodhisattvas, and are chanted during ceremonies and rituals. In the Kwan Um school of Zen for example, a mantra of Guanyin ("Kwanseum Bosal") may be used during sitting meditation. The Heart Sutra Mantra is also another mantra that is used in Zen during various rituals. Another example is the Mantra of Light, which is common in both the Chinese Chan tradition (where it is mostly used during the Shuilu Fahui ceremony) as well as the Japanese Soto Zen and (where its usage derives from the Shingon sect).

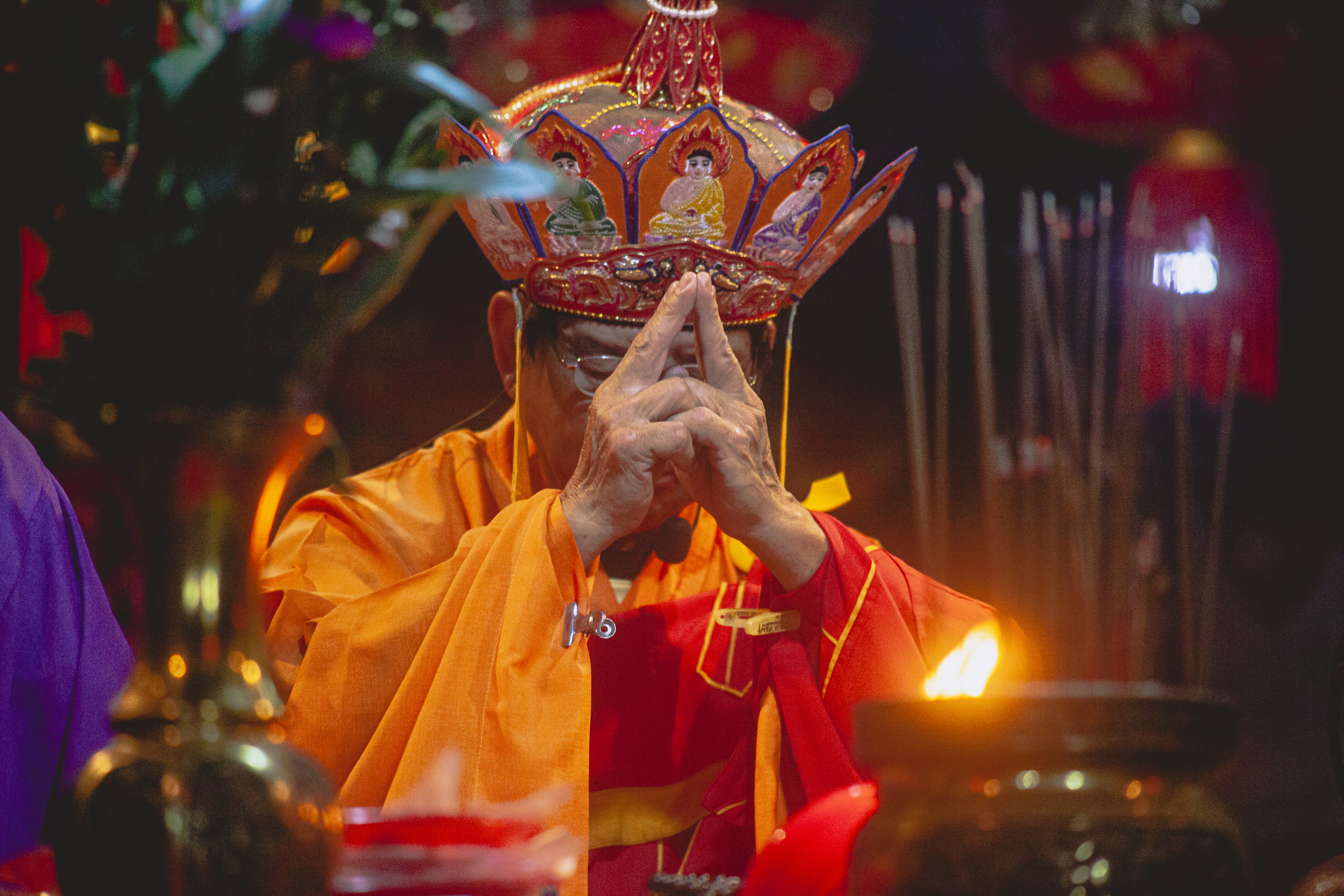
A Chinese Chan monk taking on the role of a tantric vajrācārya during a Yujia Yankou ritual

In Chinese Chan, the usage of esoteric mantras goes back to the Tang dynasty. There is evidence that Chan Buddhists adopted practices from Chinese Esoteric Buddhism in findings from Dunhuang. According to Henrik Sørensen, several successors of Shenxiu (such as Jingxian and Yixing) were also students of the Zhenyan (Mantra) school. Influential esoteric dhāraṇī, such as the Uṣṇīṣa Vijaya Dhāraṇī Sūtra and the Nīlakaṇṭha Dhāraṇī, also begin to be cited in the literature of the Baotang school during the Tang dynasty. The eighth-century Chan monks of Shaolin temple also practiced esoteric practices, such as mantras and dharanis. Many mantras have been preserved since the Tang period and continue to be practiced in modern monasteries. One common example is the Śūraṅgama Mantra, which is commonly chanted by monastics as part of the morning liturgy (朝誦 Chaosong) and evening liturgy (暮誦 Musong) in temples. Various rituals that continue to be practiced by Chan monastics, such as the tantric Yujia Yankou rite and the extensive Shuilu Fahui ceremony, also involve esoteric aspects, including maṇḍala offerings, deity yoga and the invocation of esoteric deities such as the Five Wisdom Buddhas and the Ten Wisdom Kings.

In Japan, Zen schools also adopted esoteric rites and continue to perform them. These include the ambrosia gate (甘露門 kanro mon) ghost festival ritual which includes esoteric elements, the secret Dharma transmission (嗣法 shihō) rituals and in some cases the goma ritual.

During the Joseon Dynasty, the Korean Zen (Seon) was highly inclusive and ecumenical. This extended to Esoteric Buddhist lore and rituals (that appear in Seon literature from the 15th century onwards). According to Sørensen, the writings of several Seon masters (such as Hyujeong) reveal they were esoteric adepts. In Japanese Zen, the use of esoteric practices within Zen is sometimes termed "mixed Zen" (兼修禪 kenshū zen), and the influential Soto monk Keizan Jōkin (1264–1325) was a major promoter of esoteric methods. Keizan was heavily influenced by Shingon and Shugendo, and is known for introducing numerous esoteric ritual forms into the Soto school. Another influential Soto figure, Menzan Zuihō (1683-1769), was also a practitioner of Shingon, having received esoteric initiation under a Shingon figure named Kisan Biku (義燦比丘). Similarly, numerous Rinzai figures were also esoteric practitioners, such as the Rinzai founder Myōan Eisai (1141–1215) and Enni Ben'en (1202–1280). Under Enni Ben'en's abbotship, Fumon-in (the future Tōfuku-ji) held Shingon and Tendai rituals. He also lectured on the esoteric Mahavairocana sutra.

=== The arts ===
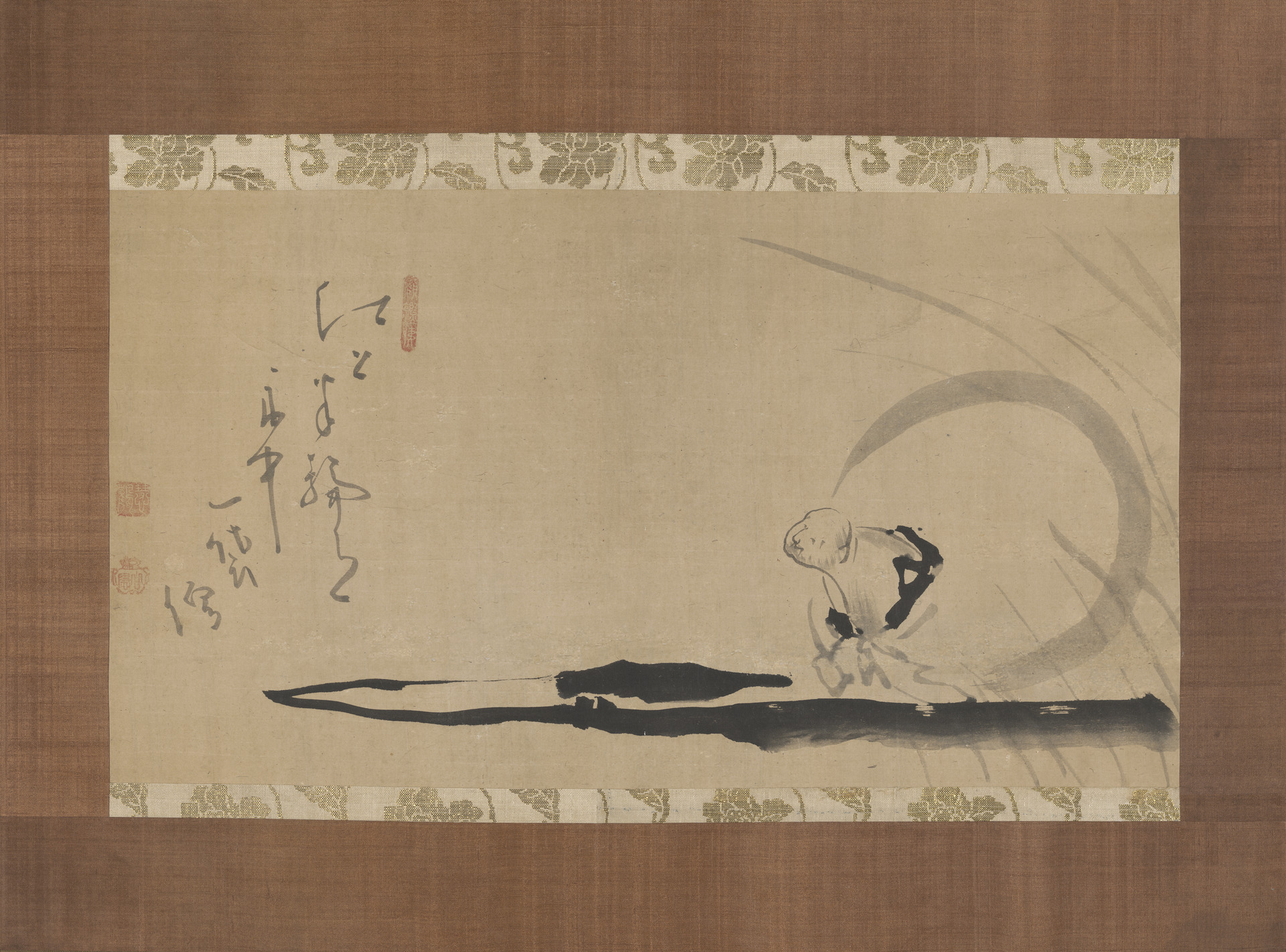
Hakuin Ekaku, Hotei in a Boat, Yale University Art Gallery

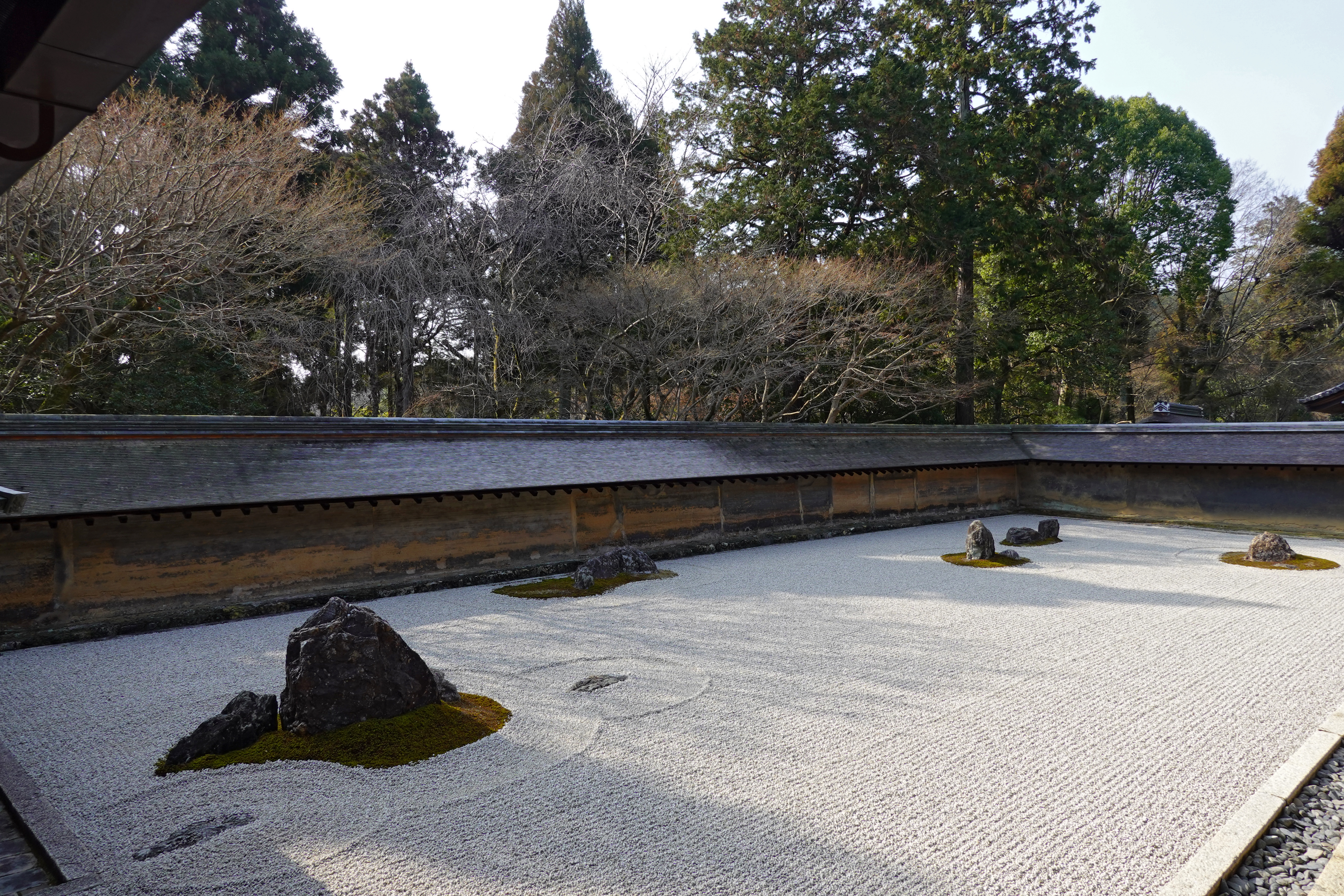
The kare-sansui (dry landscape) zen garden at Ryōan-ji

Certain arts such as painting, calligraphy, poetry, gardening, flower arrangement, tea ceremony and others have also been used as part of zen training and practice. Classical Chinese arts like brush painting and calligraphy were used by Chan monk painters such as Guanxiu and Muqi Fachang to communicate their spiritual understanding in unique ways to their students. Some Zen writers even argued that "devotion to an art" (Japanese: suki) could be a spiritual practice that leads to enlightenment, as the Japanese monk poet Chōmei writes in his Hosshinshū.

Zen paintings are sometimes termed zenga in Japanese. Hakuin is one Japanese Zen master who was known to create a large corpus of unique sumi-e (ink and wash paintings) and Japanese calligraphy to communicate zen in a visual way. His work and that of his disciples were widely influential in Japanese Zen. Another example of Zen arts can be seen in the short-lived Fuke sect of Japanese Zen, which practiced a unique form of "blowing zen" (suizen 吹禅) by playing the shakuhachi bamboo flute.

=== Physical cultivation ===
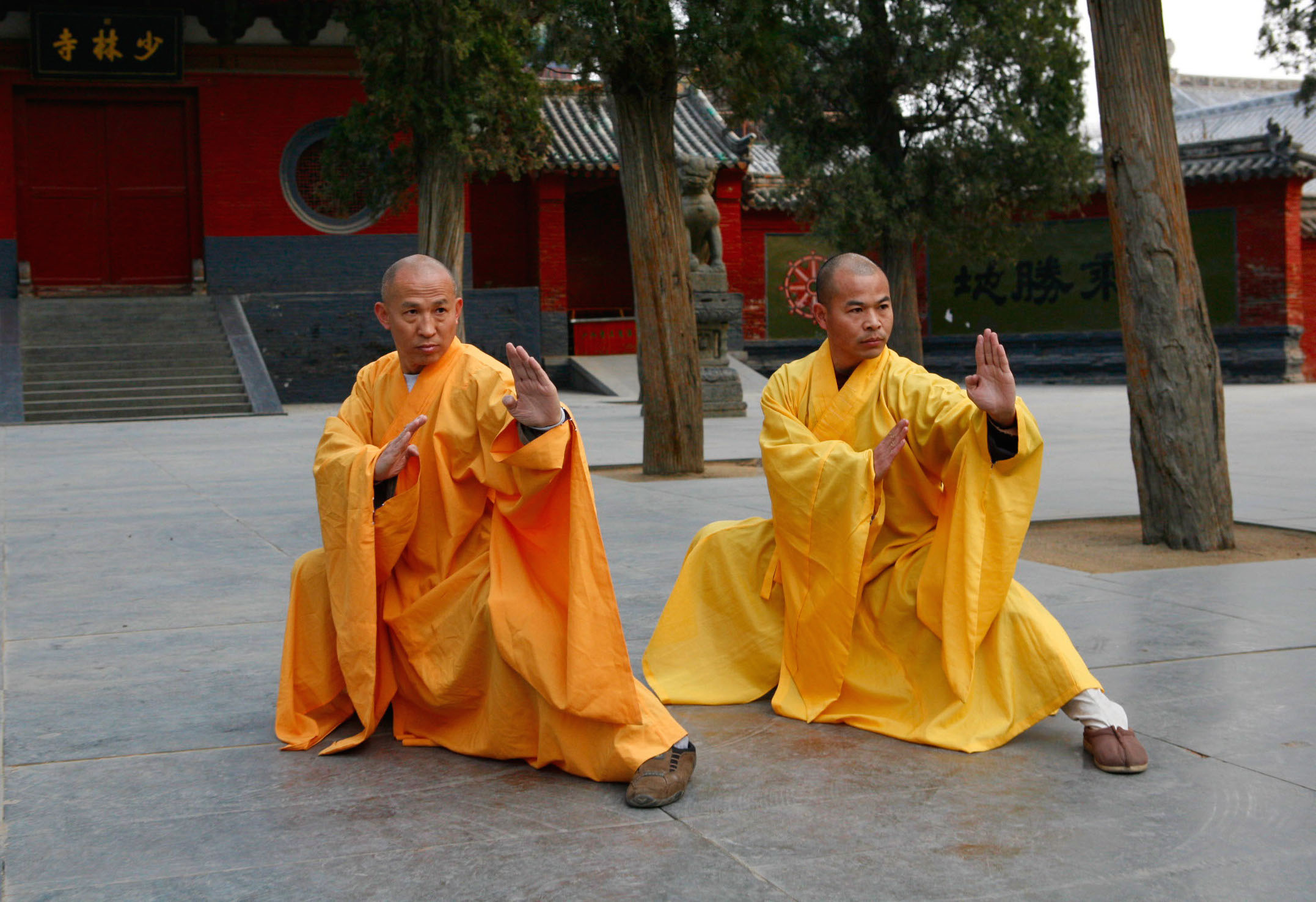
Two grandmasters of the Shaolin Temple of Chinese Chan, Shi DeRu and Shi DeYang

Traditional martial arts, like Chinese martial arts, Japanese archery, other forms of Japanese budō have also been seen as forms of zen praxis by some Zen schools. In China, this trend goes back to the influential Shaolin Monastery in Henan, which developed the first institutionalized form of gōngfu. By the late Ming, Shaolin gōngfu was very popular and widespread, as evidenced by mentions in various forms of Ming literature (featuring staff wielding fighting monks like Sun Wukong) and historical sources, which also speak of Shaolin's impressive monastic army that rendered military service to the state in return for patronage.

These Shaolin practices, which began to develop around the 12th century, were also traditionally seen as a form of Chan Buddhist inner cultivation (today called wuchan, "martial chan"). The Shaolin arts also made use of Taoist physical exercises (daoyin), breathing, and qi cultivation (qigong) practices. They were seen as therapeutic practices, which improved "internal strength" (neili), health and longevity (lit. "nourishing life" yangsheng), as well as means to spiritual liberation. The influence of these Taoist practices can be seen in the work of Wang Zuyuan (ca. 1820–after 1882), whose Illustrated Exposition of Internal Techniques (Neigong tushuo) shows how Shaolin monks drew on Taoist methods like those of the Yijin Jing and Eight pieces of brocade. According to the modern Chan master Sheng Yen, Chinese Buddhism has adopted internal cultivation exercises from the Shaolin tradition as ways to "harmonize the body and develop concentration in the midst of activity." This is because, "techniques for harmonizing the vital energy are powerful assistants to the cultivation of samadhi and spiritual insight." Korean Seon also has developed a similar form of active physical training, termed Sunmudo.

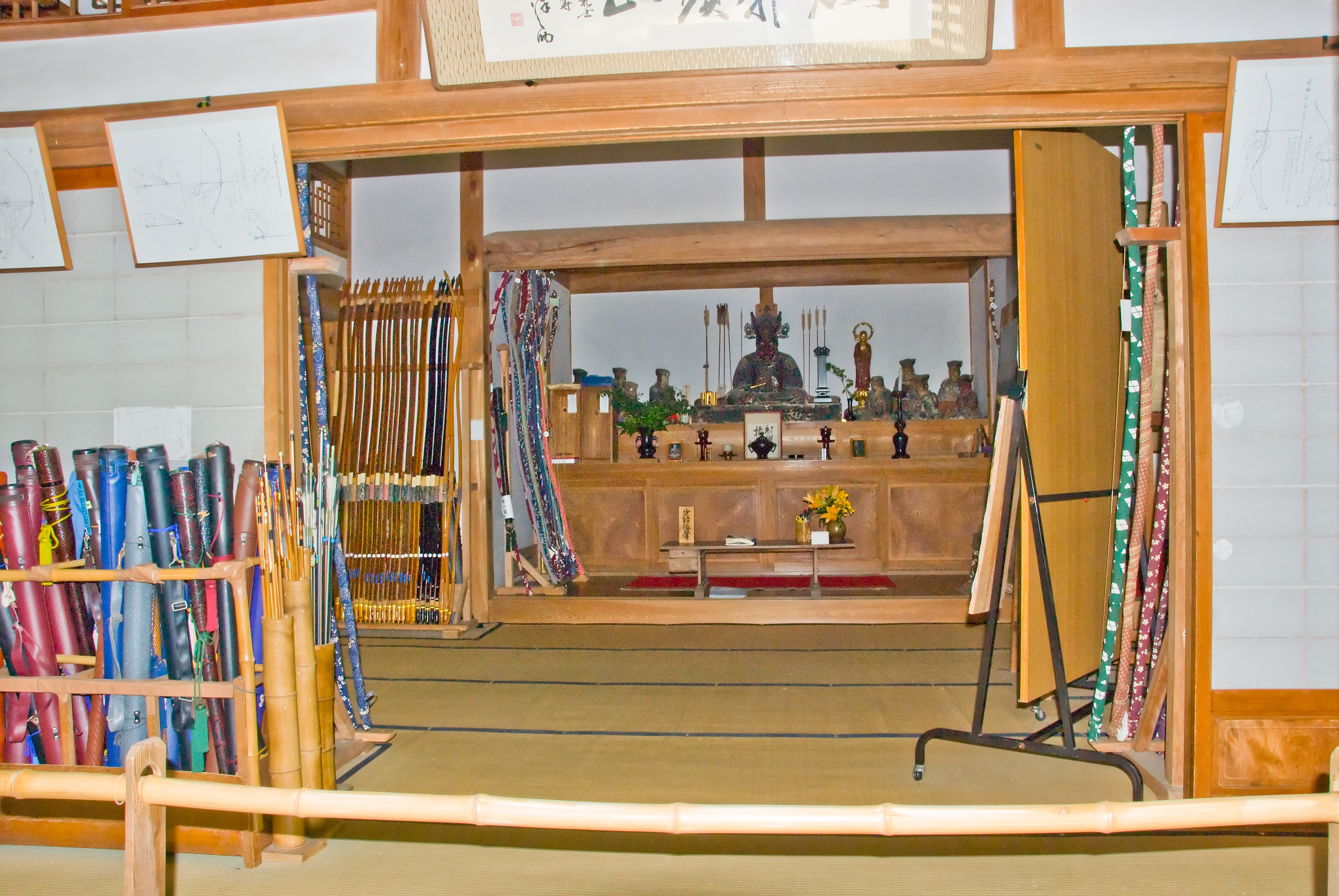
Bows and quivers at Engaku-ji temple, the temple also has a Dōjō for the practice of Kyūdō and the Zen priests practice this art here.

In Japan, the classic combat arts (budō) and zen practice have been in contact since the embrace of Rinzai Zen by the Hōjō clan in the 13th century, who applied zen discipline to their martial practice. One influential figure in this relationship was the Rinzai priest Takuan Sōhō who was well known for his writings on zen and budō addressed to the samurai class (especially his The Unfettered Mind) .

The Rinzai school also adopted certain Chinese practices involving qi (which are also common in Taoism). They were introduced by Hakuin (1686–1769), who learned various techniques from a hermit named Hakuyu, who helped Hakuin cure his "Zen sickness" (a condition of physical and mental exhaustion). These energetic practices, known as naikan, are based on focusing the mind, and one's vital energy (ki) on the tanden (a spot slightly below the navel).

== Doctrine ==
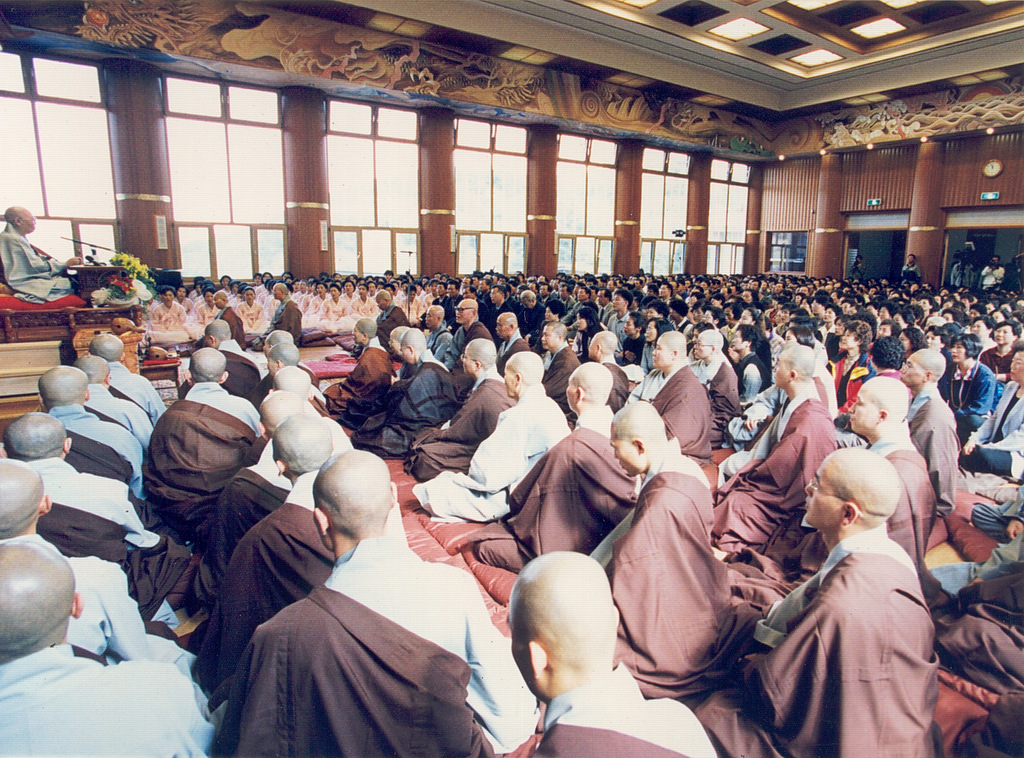
A Dharma talk by Seon nun Daehaeng Kun Sunim, Hanmaum Seon Center, South Korea

Zen is grounded in the doctrinal background of East Asian Buddhism. Zen doctrinal teaching is thoroughly influenced by Mahayana teachings on the bodhisattva path, Chinese Madhyamaka (Sānlùn), Yogachara (Wéishí), the Prajñaparamita literature, and Buddha-nature texts like the Laṅkāvatāra Sūtra and the Nirvana sutra.

Some Zen traditions (especially Linji- and Rinzai-focused traditions) stress a narrative which sees Zen as a "special transmission outside scriptures", which does not "stand upon words". Nevertheless, Mahayana Buddhist doctrine and East Asian Buddhist teachings remain an essential part of Zen Buddhism. Various Zen masters throughout the history of Zen, like Guifeng Zongmi, Jinul, and Yongming Yanshou, have instead promoted the "correspondence of the teachings and Zen", which argues for the unity of Zen and the Buddhist teachings.

In Zen, doctrinal teaching is often compared to "the finger pointing at the moon". While Zen doctrines point to the moon (awakening, the Dharma-realm, the originally enlightened mind), one should not mistake fixating on the finger (the teachings) to be Zen, instead one must look at the moon (reality). As such, doctrinal teachings are just another skillful means (upaya) which can help one attain awakening. They are not the goal of Zen, nor are they held as fixed dogmas to be attached to (since ultimate reality transcends all concepts), but are nevertheless seen as useful (as long as one does not reify them or cling to them).

=== Buddha-nature and innate enlightenment ===
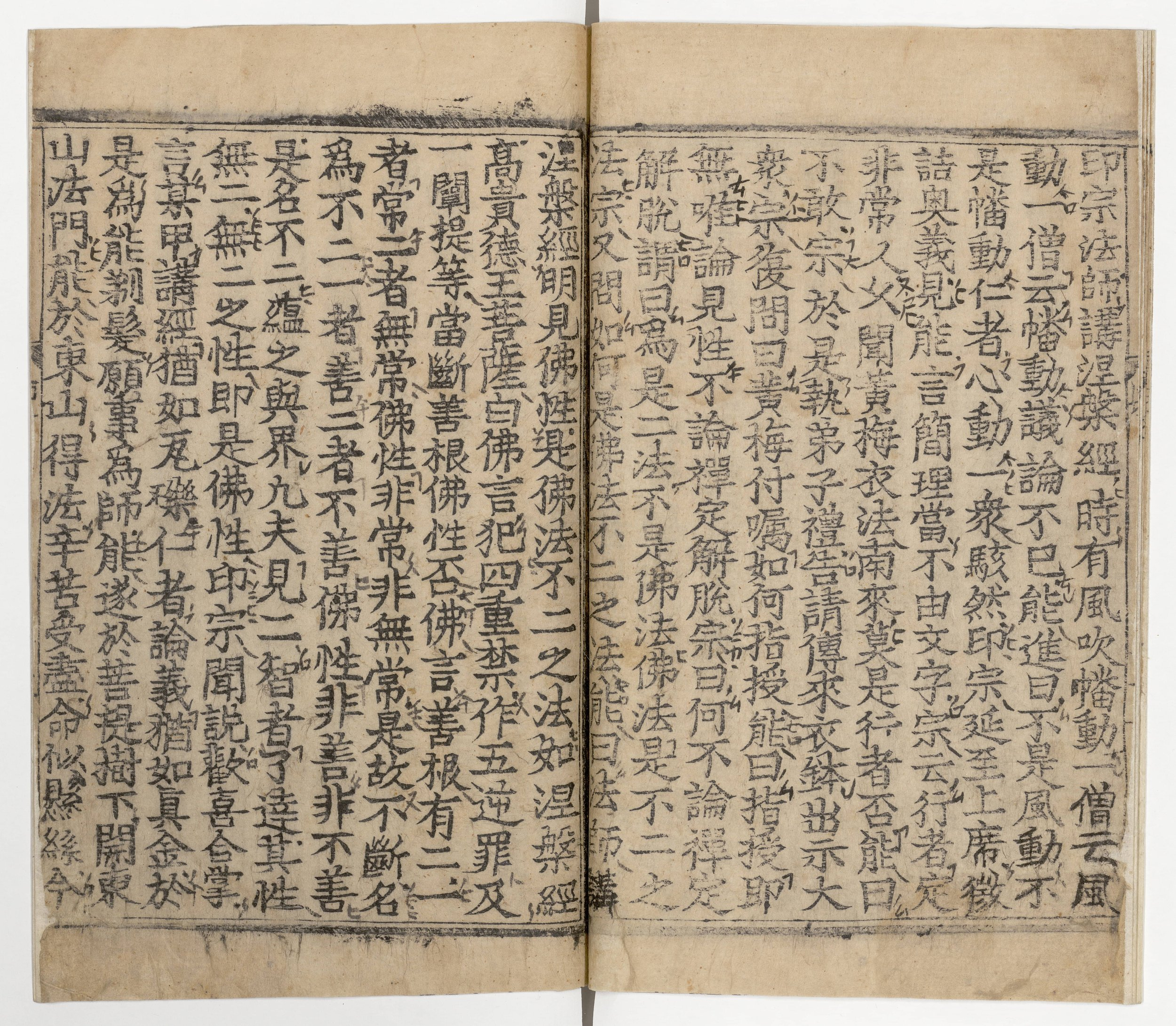
Korean woodblock print of "The Sixth Patriarch's Dharma Jewel Platform Sutra" (c. 1310), a key Zen text which contains the basic doctrines of Zen. Bibliothèque Nationale de France.

The complex Mahayana Buddhist notion of Buddha-nature (Sanskrit: Buddhadhātu; Chinese: 佛性, fóxìng; Japanese: busshō) was a key idea in the doctrinal development of Zen and remains central to Zen Buddhism. In China, this doctrine developed to encompass the related teaching of original enlightenment (Chinese: 本覺, běnjué; Japanese: hongaku), which held that the awakened mind of a Buddha is already present in each sentient being and that enlightenment is "inherent from the outset" and "accessible in the present."

Drawing on sources like the Laṅkāvatāra Sūtra, the Buddha-nature sutras, the Awakening of Faith, and the Sutra of Perfect Enlightenment, Chan masters championed the view that the innately awakened Buddha-mind was immanently present within all beings. Following the view of the Awakening of Faith, this awakened Buddha-nature is seen in Zen as the empty source of all things, the ultimate principle (li) out of which all phenomena (Chinese: shi; i.e. all dharmas) arise.

Thus, the Zen path is one of recognizing the inherently enlightened source that is already here. Indeed, the Zen insight and path are based on that innate awakening. By the time of the codification of the Platform Sutra (c. 8th to 13th centuries), the Zen scripture par excellence, original enlightenment had become a central teaching of the Zen tradition.

Historically influential Chan schools like the East Mountain Teaching and Hongzhou drew on the Awakening of Faith in their teachings on the Buddha-mind, "the true mind as Suchness", which Hongzhou compared to a clear mirror. Similarly, the Tang master Guifeng Zongmi draws on the Sutra of Perfect Enlightenment when he writes that "all sentient beings without exception have the intrinsically enlightened true mind", which is a "clear and bright ever-present awareness" that gets covered over by deluded thoughts. The importance of the concept of the innately awakened mind for Zen is such that it even became an alternative name for Zen, the "Buddha-mind school".

=== Emptiness and negative dialectic ===
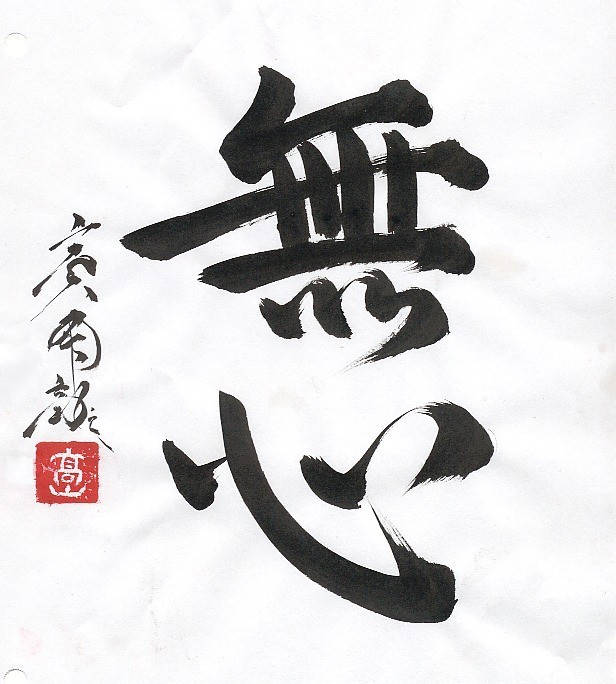
Calligraphy of no-mind 無心

The influence of Madhyamaka and Prajñaparamita on Zen can be discerned in the Zen stress on emptiness (空, kōng), non-conceptual wisdom (Sanskrit: nirvikalpa-jñana), the teaching of no-mind, and the apophatic and sometimes paradoxical language of Zen literature. (Note: According to Kalupahana, the influence of Yogacara is stronger in the ts'ao-tung school and the tradition of silent meditation, while the influence of Madhyamaka is clear in the koan-tradition and its stress on insight and the use of paradoxical language.)

Zen masters and texts took great pains to avoid the reification of doctrinal concepts and terms, including important terms like Buddha-nature and enlightenment. This is because Zen affirms the Mahayana view of emptiness, which states that all phenomena lack a fixed and independent essence (svabhava). To avoid any reification which grasps at essences, Zen sources often make use of a negative dialectic influenced by Madhyamaka philosophy. As Kasulis writes, since all things are empty, "the Zen student must learn not to think of linguistic distinctions as always referring to ontically distinct realities." Indeed, all doctrines, distinctions, and words are relative and deceptive in some way, and thus they must be transcended. This apophatic element of Zen teaching is sometimes described as Mu (Chinese: 無, romanized: wú, lit. 'no'), which appears in the famous Zhaozhou's Dog koan: A monk asked, "Does a dog have a Buddha-nature or not?"; The master said, "Not (wú)!".

Zen teachings also often include a seemingly paradoxical use of both negation and affirmation. (Note: Compare Mazu's "Mind is Buddha" versus "No mind, no Buddha": "When Ch'an Master Fa-ch'ang of Ta-mei Mountain went to see the Patriarch for the first time, he asked, "What is Buddha?" The Patriarch replied, "Mind is Buddha." [On hearing this] Fa-ch'ang had great awakening. Later, he went to live on Ta-mei Mountain. When the Patriarch heard that he was residing on the mountain, he sent one of his monks to go there and ask Fa-ch'ang, "What did the Venerable obtain when he saw Ma-tsu, so that he has come to live on this mountain?" Fach'ang said, "Ma-tsu told me that mind is Buddha; so I came to live here." The monk said, "Ma-tsu's teaching has changed recently." Fa-ch'ang asked, "What is the difference?" The monk said, "Nowadays he also says, 'Neither mind nor Buddha."' Fa-ch'ang said, "That old man still hasn't stopped confusing people. You can have 'neither mind nor Buddha,' I only care for 'mind is Buddha."' The monk returned to the Patriarch and reported what had happened. "The plum is ripe," said the Patriarch.") For example, the teachings of the influential Tang dynasty master Mazu Daoyi, founder of the Hongzhou school, could include affirmative phrases like "Mind is Buddha" as well as negative ones like "it is neither mind nor Buddha". Since no concepts or differentiations can capture the true nature of things, Zen affirms the importance of the non-conceptual and non-differentiating perfection of wisdom (prajñaparamita), which transcends all relative and conventional language (even the language of negation itself). According to Kasulis, this is the basis of much apophatic rhetoric in Zen, which often seems paradoxical or contradictory.

The importance of negation is also seen in the key Zen teaching of no-mind (無心, wuxin), which is considered to be a state of meditative clarity, free of concepts, defilements, and clinging, which is also associated with wisdom and a direct experience of the ultimate truth.

=== Non-duality ===
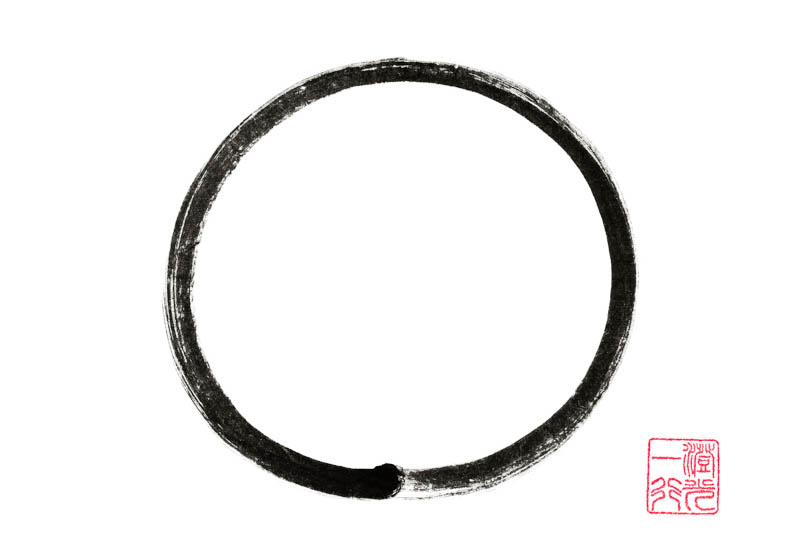
Ensō calligraphy by Thích Nhất Hạnh. Hạnh's teaching of interbeing is one modern attempt to describe Zen non-duality.

Zen texts also stress the concept of non-duality (Skt: advaya, Ch: bùèr 不二, Jp: funi), which is an important theme in Zen literature and is explained in various different ways. One set of themes is the non-dual unity of the absolute and the relative truths (which derives from the classic Buddhist theme of the two truths). This can be found in Zen sources like the Five Ranks of Tozan, Faith in Mind, and the Harmony of Difference and Sameness. It is also an important theme in Mahayana sutras which are important to Zen, like the Vimalakīrtinirdeśa and the Laṅkāvatāra Sūtra.

A related explanation of non-duality, which is influential in Zen, makes use of the Chinese Buddhist discourse of essence-function (Ch: tiyong), which is most famously taught in the influential Awakening of Faith. In this type of discourse, the essence refers to the inner nature of things, the absolute reality, while the functions refer to the more external, relative, and secondary characteristics of things. The Platform Sutra compares the essence to a lamp, while the function is its light.

Another application of non-duality in Zen discourse is the idea that mundane reality (which includes the natural world), i.e., samsara (the world of suffering) and nirvana (the ultimate, enlightened reality) are not separate. This is a view found in Indian Mahayana sources like Nagarjuna's Root Verses on Madhyamaka. As such, Buddhas and sentient beings as well as Buddhahood and the natural world, are also considered to be non-dual in Zen. This idea influenced Zen attitudes on social harmony and harmony (he, 和) with the natural world.

A further meaning of non-duality in Zen is the absence of a duality between the perceiving subject and the perceived object. This understanding of non-duality is derived from the Indian Yogachara school. The philosophy of the Huayan school also had an influence on Chinese Chan's conception of the non-dual ultimate truth and its understanding of essence-function. One example is the Huayan doctrine of the interpenetration of phenomena or "perfect interfusion" (yuanrong, 圓融), which also makes use of native Chinese philosophical concepts such as principle (li) and phenomena (shi). The influence of the related Huayan theory of the Fourfold Dharmadhatu can be seen in the Five Ranks of Dongshan Liangjie (806–869), the founder of the Caodong lineage of Chan.

=== Sudden enlightenment and seeing the nature ===
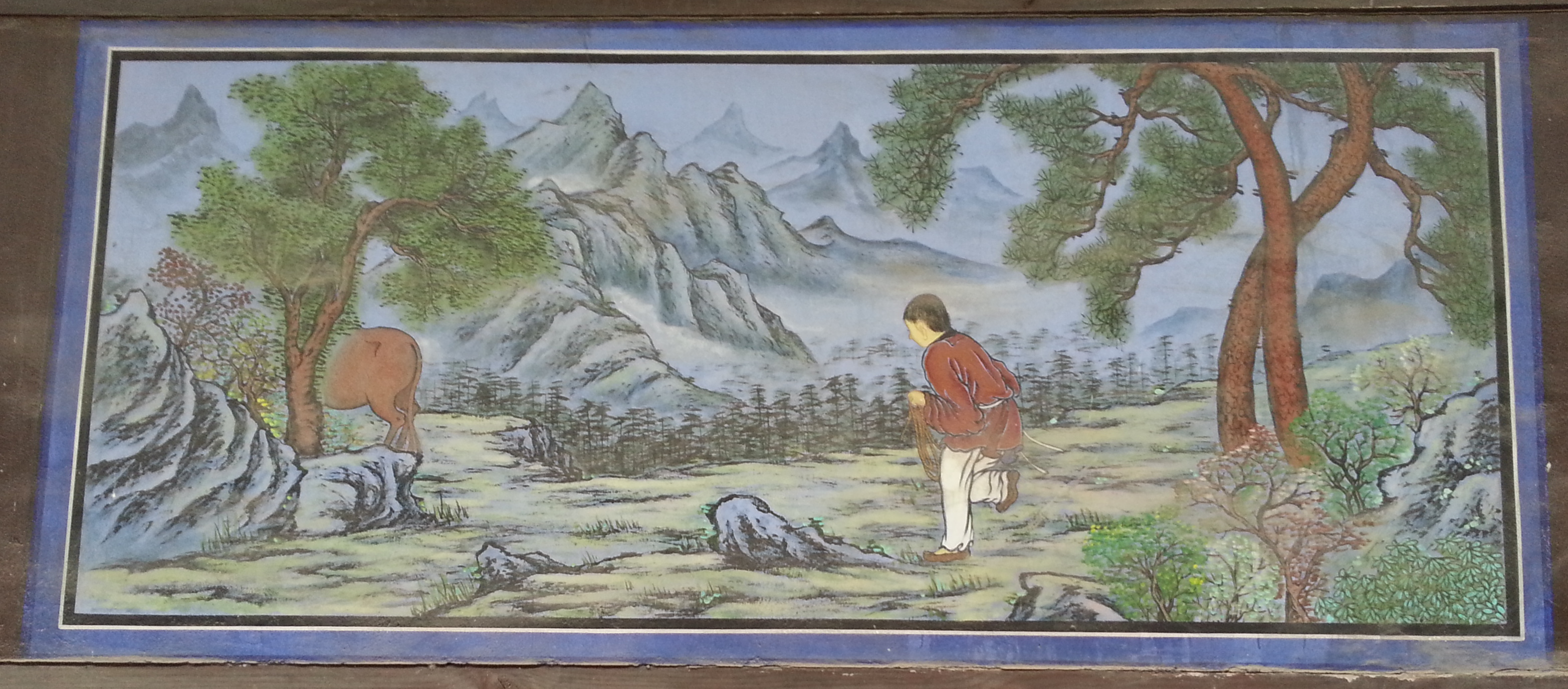
Seeing the ox, a metaphor for an initial stage in the practice of Zen. Ox-herding picture on an outdoor wall in Bongeunsa, South Korea.

The idea of the immanent character of Buddha-nature influenced Zen's characteristic emphasis on direct insight. As such, a central topic of discussion in Zen is "seeing the nature" (見性, pinyin: jiànxìng, Jp: kenshō). Zen teachings use this term to refer to an insight which can occur to a Zen practitioner suddenly, and often equate it with a kind of enlightenment. The "nature" here is the Buddha-nature, the originally enlightened mind. As such, this experience gives one a glimpse of the ultimate truth. The term jiànxìng occurs in the classic Zen phrase "seeing one's nature, becoming Buddha", which is held to encapsulate the meaning of Zen. Zen schools have disagreed with each other on how to achieve "seeing nature" (the Linji school's huatou practice vs Caodong's silent illumination) as well as how to relate to, cultivate, express, and deepen one's relationship with the experience. This remains a major topic of debate and discussion among contemporary Zen traditions.

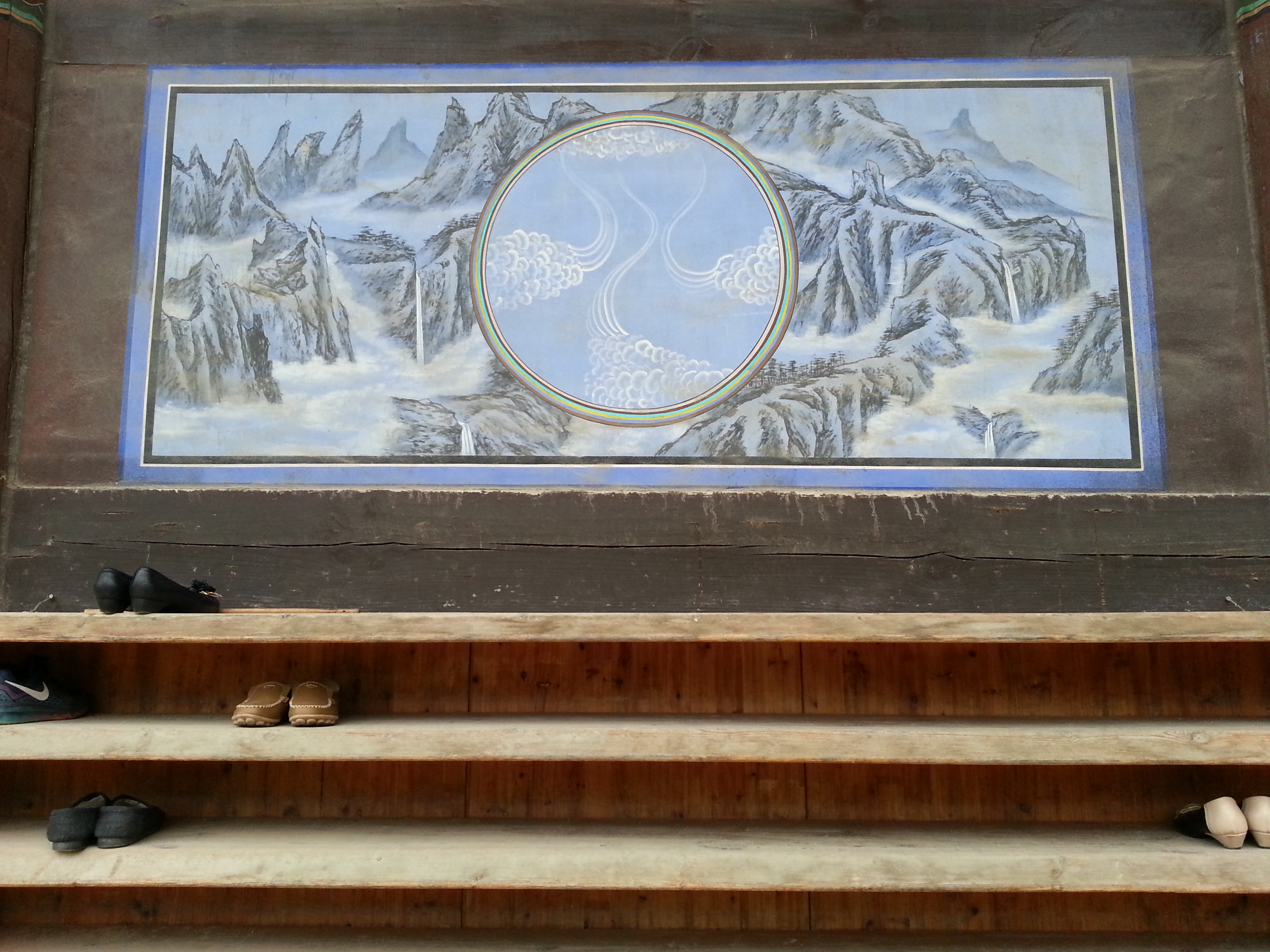
Oxherding picture depicting the insight into the ultimate truth, Bongeunsa.

Traditionally, Zen considers that its practices aim at a sudden insight into the true nature of things. This idea of sudden enlightenment or instant awakening (頓悟; dùnwù), which is closely related to "seeing the nature", is another important theme in Zen. Zen sources often argue that its "sudden" method is more direct and superior to the "gradual" paths, which take place step by step. Such methods can be found in some of the earliest Zen traditions, like the East Mountain school's teaching of "maintaining the one," a direct contemplation on Buddha-nature that was not dependent on preliminary practices or step by step instructions.

The sudden teaching was further emphasized by patriarch Shenhui and it became canonized as a key Zen teaching in the Platform Sutra. Despite the rhetorical emphasis on sudden awakening and the critique of "gradual" methods found in various Zen sources, Zen traditions accept gradual practices (such as taking precepts, scriptural study, ritual practice and the six paramitas). Instead, Zen schools generally incorporate these practices within a schema grounded in sudden enlightenment thought. (Note: For example, the Platform Sutra attempts to reconcile Shenhui's rhetoric of sudden awakening and rejection of gradualism with actual Buddhist practices and training methods, just like later Chan writers like Zongmi did.) As such, many Zen sources which emphasize sudden awakening, like the Platform Sutra, also refer to traditional Mahayana practices.

This means that the Zen path does not end at "seeing the nature", since further practice and cultivation is considered necessary to deepen one's insight, remove the traces of the defilements (attachments, aversions, etc.), and to learn to express Buddha-nature in daily life. Zen masters like Zongmi described this method as "sudden enlightenment followed by gradual cultivation", holding that the sudden and gradual teachings point to the same truth. Zongmi argued that even though sudden awakening reveals the truth directly and instantly, the Zen practitioner still has deeply rooted defilements (Skt: kleśa, Ch: fánnǎo) which cloud the mind and can only be removed through further training.

This sudden-gradual schema became a standard view of Zen practice in China after the time of Zongmi. It is found in Zen sources like Dongshan's Five Ranks, the works of Jinul, the Four Ways of Knowing of Hakuin, Torei's Undying Lamp of Zen, and the Ten Ox-Herding Pictures, which depict a gradual set of steps on the Zen path while also including the idea of a sudden awakening to an immanent innate pure nature.

== Traditions ==
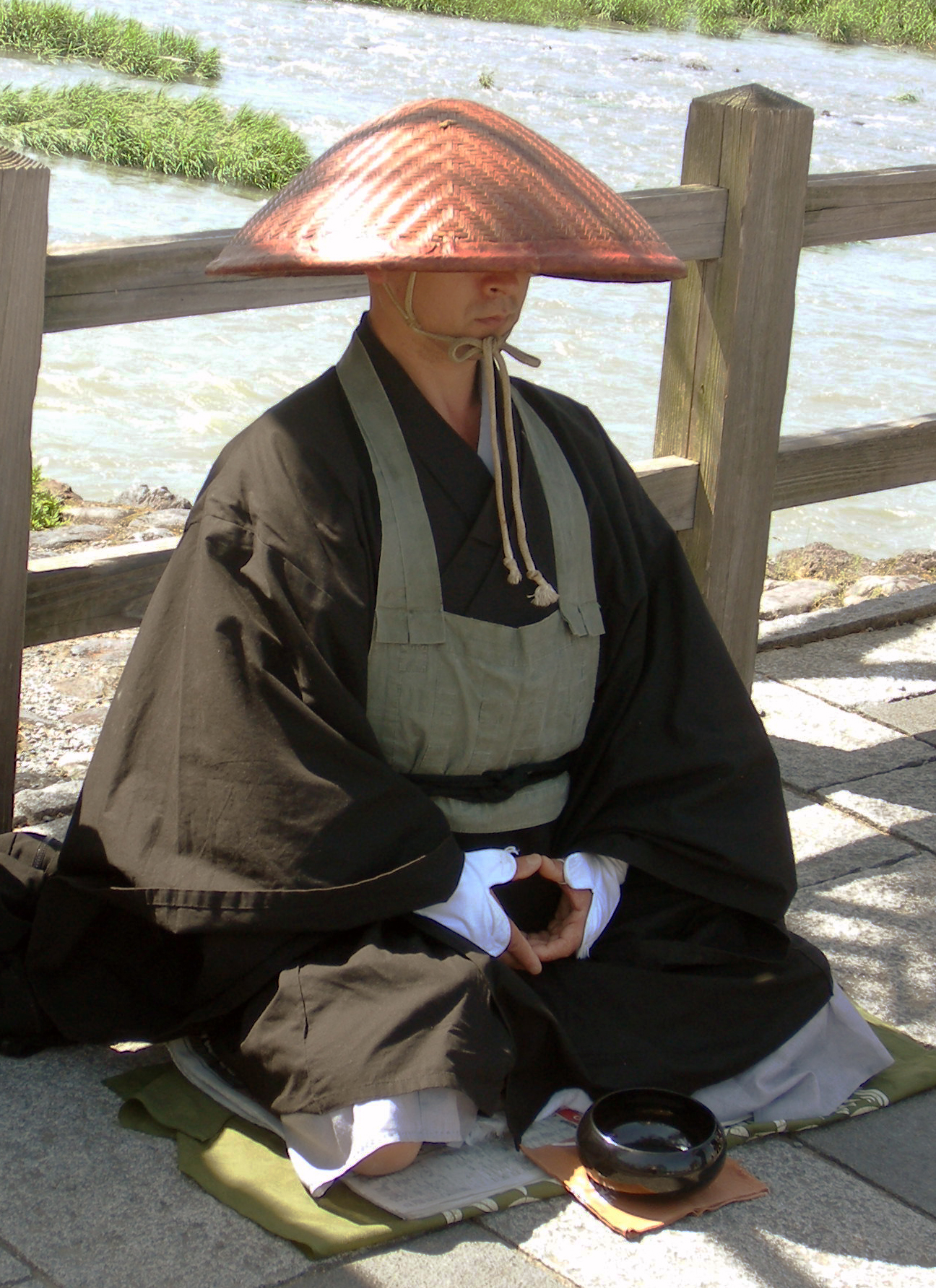
Japanese Sōtō monk on an alms round (takuhatsu) sitting zazen.

Today, there are two major traditions or groupings of Zen schools, along with numerous other smaller lineages, orders and schools. The two main lineages are the Caodong tradition traced back to Dongshan Liangjie (807–869) and the Linji school which is traced to Linji Yixuan (died 866 CE). During the Song dynasty, the Caodong lineage became closely associated with the teaching of "silent illumination" (Ch: mozhao) as formulated by Hongzhi Zhengjue (1091—1157). The competing Linji school meanwhile became associated with the contemplation method of Dahui Zonggao (1089–1163) which focuses on meditating on the huatou (critical phrase) of a koan. Some traditions and organizations include both lineages, so these categories should not be seen as mutually exclusive.

Both the Linji school and the Caodong school were transmitted outside of China to Japan, Korea and Vietnam. Sōtō is the Japanese line of Caodong and it was founded by Dōgen (1200–1253), who emphasized the practice of shikantaza (nothing but just sitting). The Sōtō school has de-emphasized kōans since Gentō Sokuchū (circa 1800). A Vietnamese Caodong lineage (Tào Động) was founded by 17th-century Chan master Thông Giác Đạo Nam. Recently, the Caodong silent illumination method was revived in the Sinosphere by Sheng Yen and his Dharma Drum Mountain association.

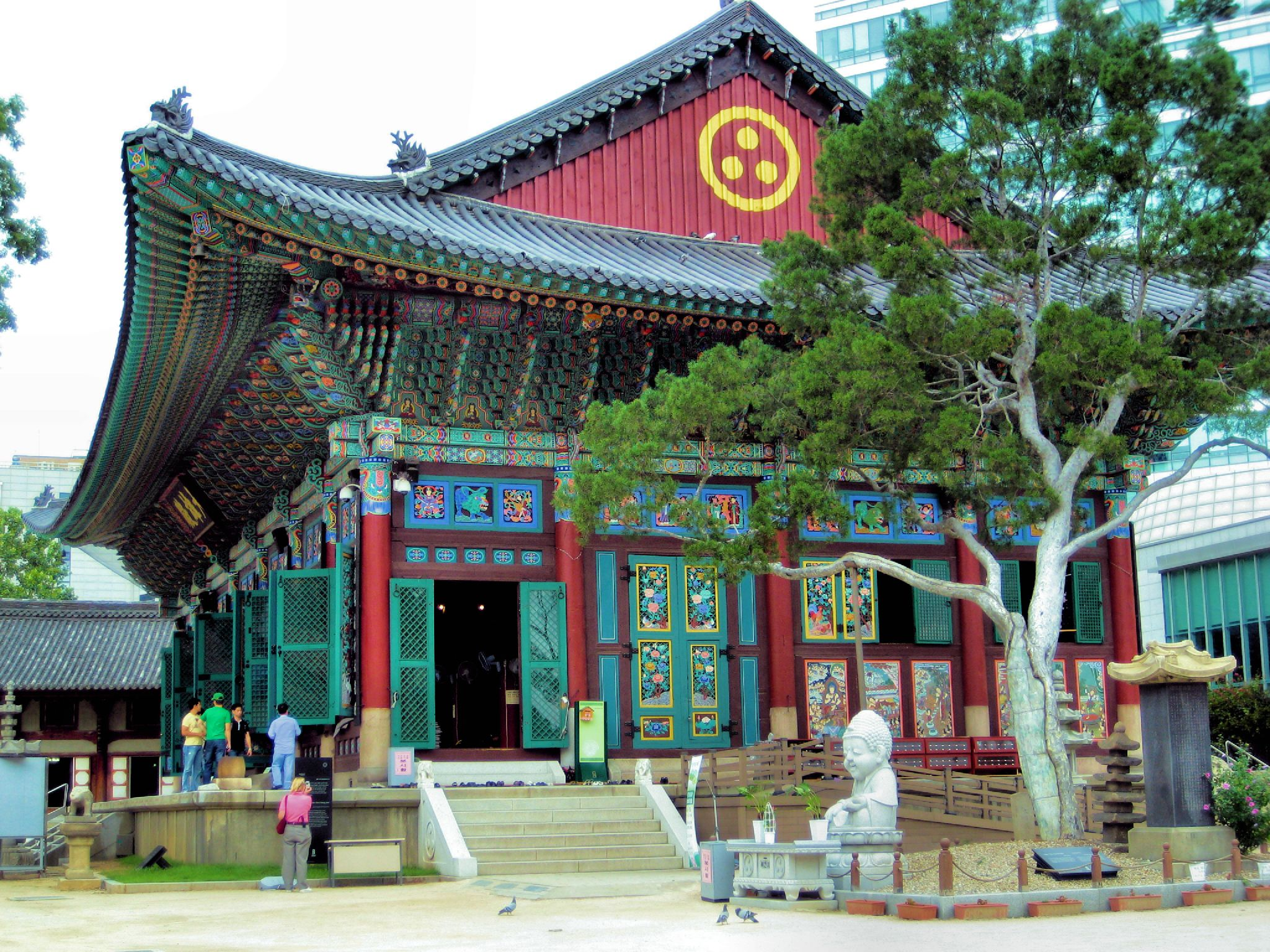
Jogyesa Temple Seon temple in Seoul

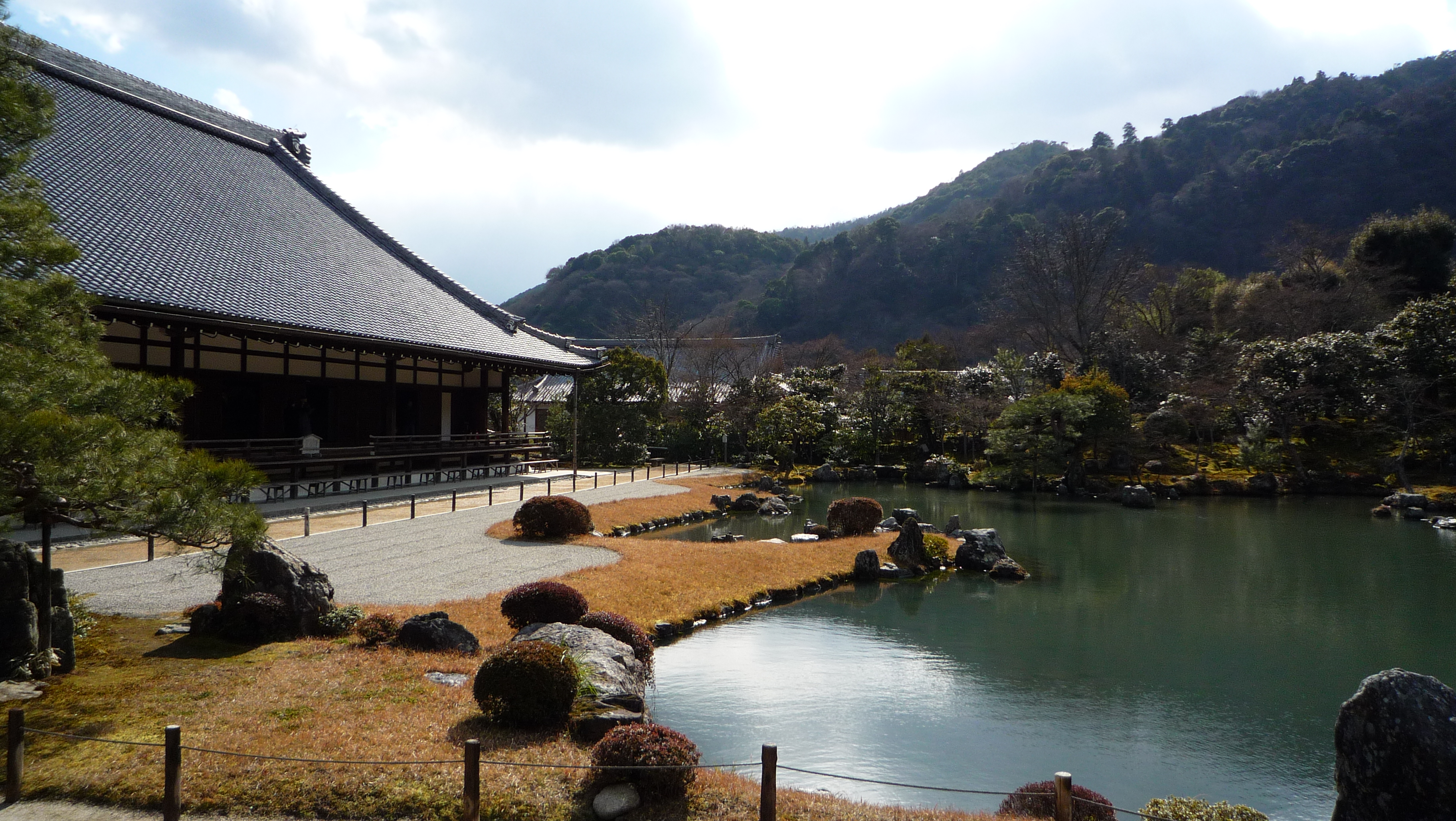
Tenryū-ji, the head temple of the Tenryū-ji branch of Rinzai.

Regarding Linji, it is known in Japan as the Rinzai school. This tradition emphasizes meditation on kōans mediated through master disciple meetings (sanzen) as the essential method to attain kenshō (seeing one's true nature). Most traditions in Korean Seon are also generally in the Linji lineage, and focus on huatou practice, though the exact methods and teachings on this differ. There are also Vietnamese lineages of Linji, such as the Lâm Tế and the Liễu Quán schools. These lineages also mix Zen practice with Pure Land elements.

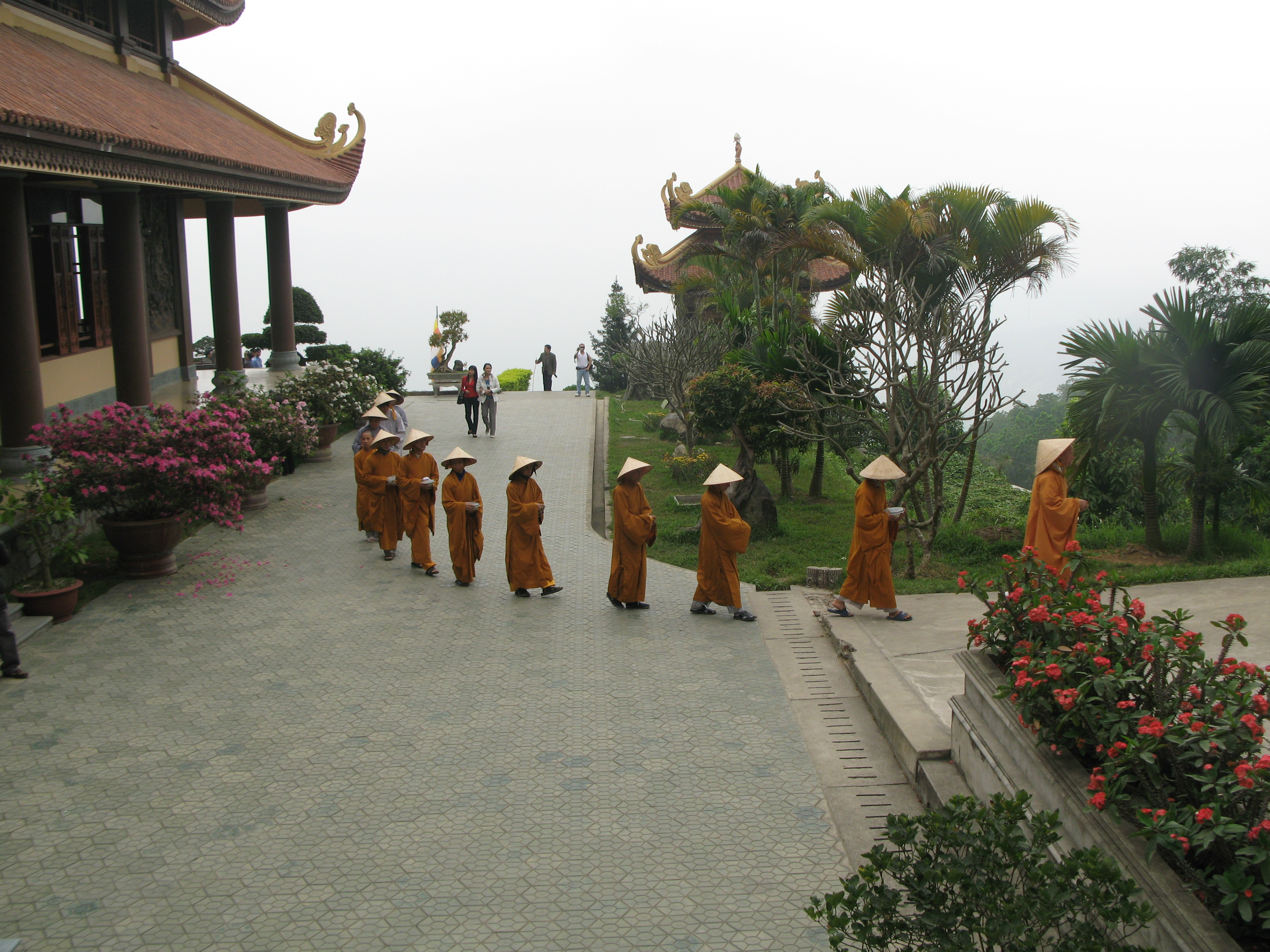
Monks of the Trúc Lâm school, Tây Thiên Monastery

Besides the two major families or traditions of Zen, there are several smaller schools. These include:

- Ōbaku-shū (黄檗宗), a school established in the 17th century. It includes classic Chan teachings and also Pure Land methods.
- Fuke-shū (普化宗), a small Japanese sect. A unique feature of this sect is the use of flute music as a meditation.
- Sanbo Kyodan, a modern Japanese school which draws on both Rinzai and Sōtō methods.
- Trúc Lâm, a unique native sect of Vietnamese Zen which is known for attempting to harmonize the "Three teachings" of Buddhism, Confucianism and Taoism.
- The Plum Village (Làng Mai) Tradition, a new modern tradition founded by the influential Vietnamese teacher and activist Thích Nhất Hạnh (1926–2022)
- The Kwan Um School of Zen, a new modern tradition founded by Zen Master Seung Sahn
- Schools of Zen recently founded in America, such as Ordinary Mind Zen School and White Plum Asanga.

=== Organization and institutions ===
Zen practice, like that of all religions, is supported by collective endeavors. Though some Zen sources sometimes emphasize individual experience and antinomianism, Zen traditions are maintained and transferred by mostly hierarchical temple based institutions focused around a core of ordained clergy. These Zen masters or teachers (Ch: shīfu 師父; Jp: rōshi or oshō) may or may not be celibate monastics (bhiksus who follow the Vinaya, the traditional Buddhist monastic code) depending on the tradition.

Some important Zen organizations include the Japanese Sōtō school, the Soto Zen Buddhist Association of America, the various independent branches of Japanese Rinzai, the Korean Jogye and Taego orders, and the Chinese Dharma Drum Mountain and Fo Guang Shan organizations. In Japan, modernity led to criticism of traditional Zen institutions and new lay-oriented Zen-schools such as the Sanbo Kyodan and the Ningen Zen Kyodan emerged in response. Some modern challenges for contemporary Zen include how to organize the continuity of the Zen-tradition, constraining charismatic authority (with the risk of abuse of power it brings) on the one hand, and maintaining the legitimacy of traditional authorities by limiting the number of authorized teachers on the other hand.

Stuart Lachs has argued that the presentation of the roshi in Western Zen draws on hagiographical conventions which, combined with the dharma transmission, insulate teachers from ordinary accountability.

=== Dharma transmission ===
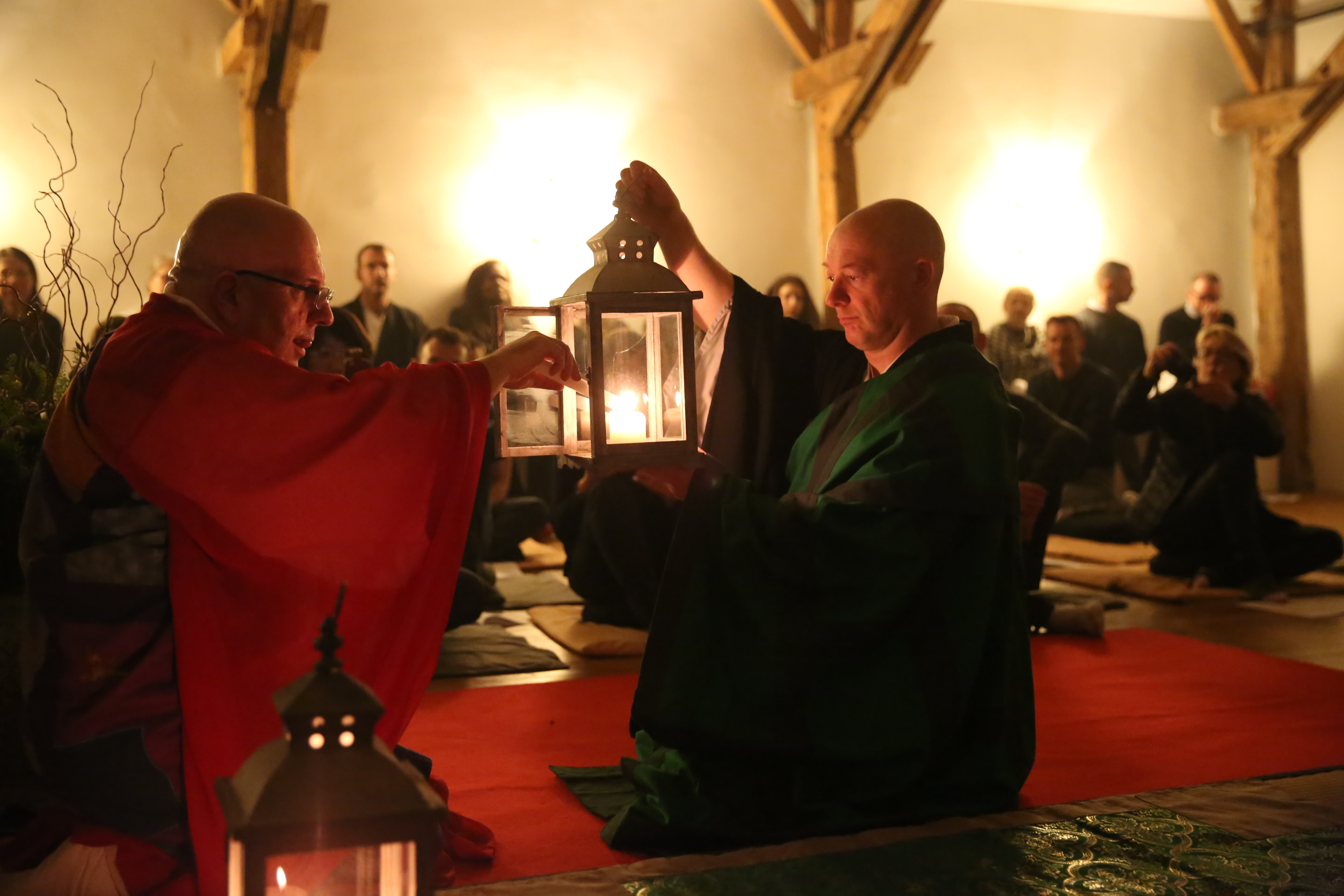
Soto Zen priest Myozan Kodo, right, receives Dharma Transmission from his teacher Taigu Turlur, Paris, 2014.

An important feature of traditional Zen institutions is the use of dharma transmission (Chinese: 傳法 chuán fǎ) from master to disciple to pass on Zen lineages to the next generation. The procedure of dharma transmission, particularly the act of "authorization" or "confirmation" (印可, Ch: yìn kě, Jp: inka, K: inga), is considered to establish a Zen teacher as a direct successor of their master and to link them to a lineage which is traditionally believed to go back to the ancient Chinese patriarchs and to the Buddha himself. These transmissions are sometimes seen esoterically as the "mind to mind" transmission of the light of awakening from master to disciple. Scholars like William Bodiford and John Jorgensen have argued that this "ancestral" dimension of Zen which sees the school as an extended family is influenced by Confucian values, and that it is part of what allowed Zen to become such an influential form of Buddhism in East Asia.

Zen lineages often maintain Zen lineage charts which list all the teachers in their transmission lineage, establishing institutional legitimacy by claiming a direct link from the Buddha to the present. Indeed, according to Michel Mohr, the traditional view is that "it is through the transmission process that the identity and integrity of the lineage is preserved." Zen lineage narratives were further supported by "transmission of the lamp" texts (e.g. Jǐngdé Chuándēnglù), which contained stories of the past masters and legitimized Zen lineages. These texts could often be sectarian, favoring a specific lineage or school and they sometimes even led to conflict among the Zen schools. Furthermore, these Zen transmission narratives were often not historically accurate and contain mythological material developed over centuries in China. Their historicity has been recently critiqued by modern scholars.

The formal practice of dharma transmission is generally understood in two main ways by Zen traditions. It can be seen as a formal recognition of a disciple's deep spiritual realization, which is separate from clerical ordination. It could also be understood as an institutional procedure which ensures the transmission of a temple lineage.

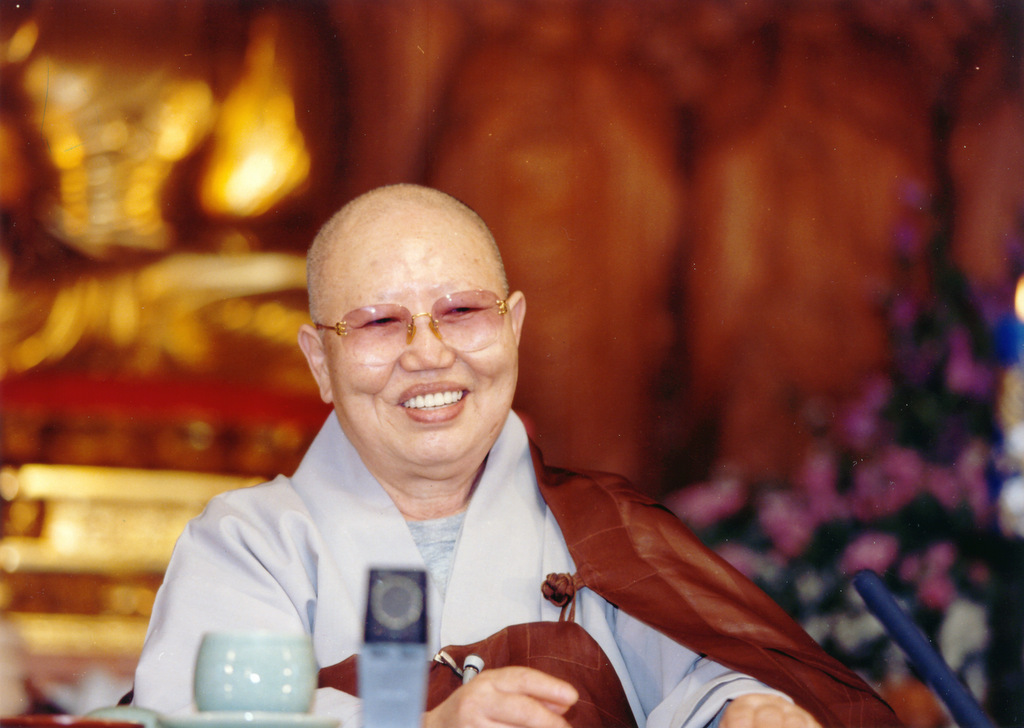
Daehaeng, a modern Korean Sŏn nun who was said to have "awakened herself through many years of ascetic practices rather than through teachers or going through formal Buddhist training." See the phenomenon known as "wisdom without a teacher."

The institutions of Dharma transmission have come under criticism in various times throughout Zen history. According to Jørn Borup, Zen masters like Linji and Ikkyū "were said to have refused to receive transmission certificates," rejecting the circus associated with such things. During the Ming dynasty, important masters like Hanshan Deqing, Zibo Zhenke, and Yunqi Zhuhong did not belong to any formal lineage. According to Jiang Wu, these eminent Ming Chan monks emphasized self-cultivation while criticizing formulaic instructions and nominal recognition. Wu writes that at this time "eminent monks, who practiced meditation and asceticism but without proper dharma transmission, were acclaimed as acquiring 'wisdom without teachers' (wushizhi)." Hanshan's writings indicate that he seriously questioned the value of dharma transmission, seeing personal enlightenment as what truly mattered in Zen.

In a similar fashion, several important medieval Japanese masters like Takuan Sōhō eschewed formal transmission and did not believe it was necessary since the Dharma was always available to be discovered within. Suzuki Shōsan, an example of the phenomenon known as "self-enlightened and self-certified" (jigo jishō 自悟自証), or "enlightened independently without a teacher" (mushi-dokugo 無師独悟), did not receive transmission in any particular school of Zen. Modern Chinese Buddhists like Tanxu, Taixu and Yinshun criticized dharma transmission, seeing it as a Chinese invention that was not taught by the Buddha. Taixu held that the practice led to sectarianism, and Tanxu wrote that it contributed to the decline of Zen. Yinshun believed that the Dharma was not something that could belong to anyone and thus it could not be "transmitted" in a lineage.

== Scripture ==
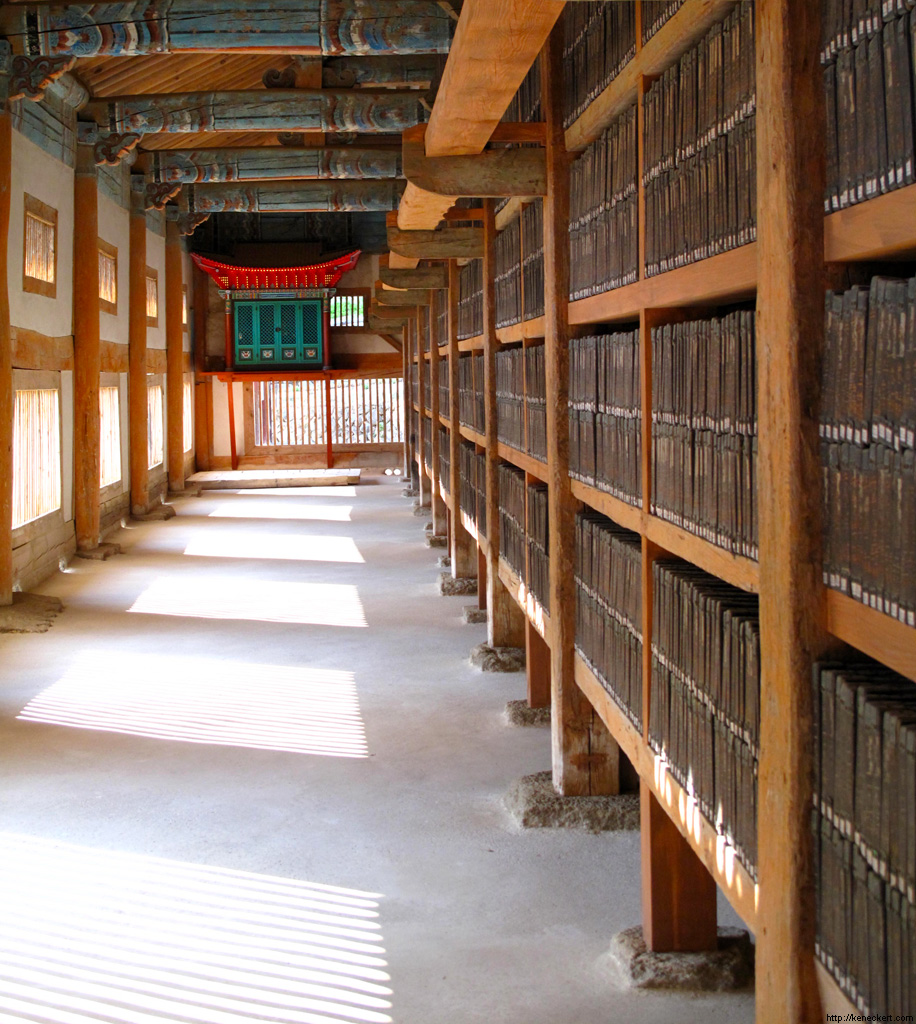
Tablets of the Tripiṭaka Koreana, an early edition of the Chinese Buddhist canon, in Haeinsa, the head temple of the Seon Jogye order, South Korea

=== The role of scripture in Zen ===
Zen is deeply rooted in the teachings and doctrines of Mahāyāna Buddhism. Classic Zen texts, such as the Platform sutra, contain numerous references to Mahāyāna sutras. According to Sharf, Zen monastics "are expected to become familiar with the classics of the Zen canon". A review of the early historical literature of early Zen clearly reveals that their authors were well versed in numerous Mahāyāna sūtras, as well as Mahayana Buddhist philosophy such as Madhyamaka.

Nevertheless, Zen masters are sometimes pictured as iconoclastically anti-intellectual and dismissive of scriptural study, or at least as weary of scripture. Early Chan sources contain numerous statements which see scriptural study as unnecessary. The Bodhidharma Anthology for example states "don't use knowledge of the sutras and treatises" and instead states one should return to the ultimate principle, "firmly abiding without shifting, in no way following after the written teachings". The Bloodstream Sermon states: "The true Way is sublime. It can't be expressed in language. Of what use are scriptures? But someone who sees his own nature finds the Way, even if he can't read a word."

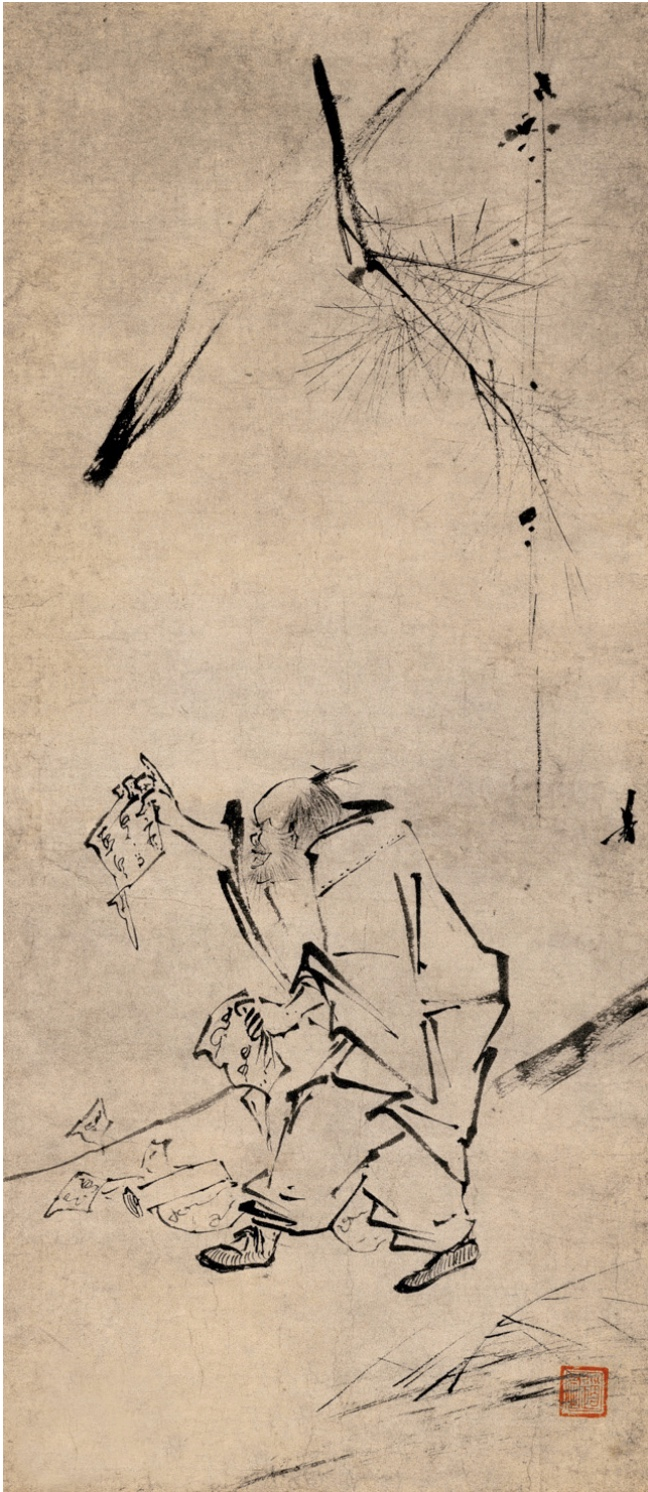
Liang Kai, The Sixth Patriarch Tearing a Sutra, Song dynasty (960–1279 AD)

This radical antinomian view of Zen became more pronounced during a period between the late Tang and the Song Dynasty (960–1297), when Chan (especially the Hongzhou school) became the dominant in China, and gained great popularity among the literary classes who were attracted to the idea that true sages did not depend on texts and language. Several famous phrases from this period defined Zen as "not established on words and letters" and as "a special transmission outside the scriptures" (statements which were anachronistically attributed to Bodhidharma). The Record of Linji is even more radical, stating that the Buddhist scriptures are "all so much old toilet paper to wipe away filth". Another example of this attitude is found in the story of Deshan Xuanjian, who is known for having burned all his scriptural commentaries.

However, scholars like Welter and Hori write that these rhetorical statements were not a complete denial of the importance of study and scripture, but a warning to those who mistake the teachings for the direct insight into truth itself. Indeed, Chan masters of this period continue to cite and refer to Buddhist sutra passages. (Note: Sasaki's translation of the Linji yulu contains an extensive biography of 62 pages, listing influential Chinese Buddhist texts that played a role in Song dynasty Chán.) (Note: Albert Low: "It is evident that the masters were well versed in the sutras. Zen master Tokusan, for example, knew the Diamond Sutra well and, before meeting with his own Zen master, lectured upon it extensively; the founder of the Zen sect, Bodhidharma, the very one who preached selfrealization outside the scriptures, nevertheless advocated the Lankavatara Sutra; Zen master Hogen knew the Avatamsaka Sutra well, and koan twenty-six in the Mumonkan, in which Hogen is involved, comes out of the teaching of that sutra. Other koans, too, make reference directly or indirectly to the sutras. The autobiography of yet another Zen master, Hui Neng, subsequently became the Platform Sutra, one of those sutras so condemned by those who reject intellectual and sutra studies") (Note: Poceski: "Direct references to specific scriptures are relatively rare in the records of Mazu and his disciples, but that does not mean that they rejected the canon or repudiated its authority. On the contrary, one of the striking features of their records is that they are filled with scriptural quotations and allusions, even though the full extent of their usage of canonical sources is not immediately obvious and its discernment requires familiarity with Buddhist literature." See source for a full-length example from "one of Mazu's sermons", in which can be found references to the Vimalakīrti Scripture, the Huayan Scripture, the Mahāsamnipata-sūtra, the Foshuo Foming Scripture 佛說佛名經, the Lankāvatāra scripture and the Faju jing.) Furthermore, not all masters made use of this kind of "rhetorical" Chan which was popular in the Chinese Linji school and emphasized a direct "mind to mind" transmission of the truth from master to disciple while de-emphasizing sutra study. Another contrasting style of Chinese Chan was a more moderate "literary Chan" (wenzi chan, 文字禪) associated with figures like Nanyang Huizhong, Zongmi, and Yongming Yanshou. This type of Chan continued to actively promote doctrinal study as a part of Chan practice with the slogan of "the correspondence of the teachings and Chan" (chiao-ch'an i-chih). Even Mazu Daoyi, often depicted as a great iconoclast, alludes to and quotes numerous Mahayana sutras (as do other Hongzhou school masters). He also stated in his sermons that Bodhidharma "used the Lankāvatāra Scripture to seal the sentient beings' mind-ground".

Zongmi's perspective was that "the scriptures are like a marking line to be used as a standard to determine true and false....those who transmit Ch'an must use the scriptures and treatises as a standard." Juefan Huihong (1071–1128) coined the term "literary chan" and wrote on the importance of studying the sutras in his Zhizheng zhuan (Commentary on wisdom and enlightenment). Later figures like Zibo Zhenke and Hanyue Fazang (1573–1635) promoted the view of Chan practice which makes use of the sutras based on the Zhizheng zhuan. Similarly, the Japanese Rinzai master Hakuin writes that the Zen path begins with studying all the classic Buddhist sutras and commentaries, citing one of the four vows which states: "the Dharma teachings are infinite, I vow to study them all." (Note: "[A] person [...] must first gain wide-ranging knowledge, accumulate a treasure-store of wisdom by studying all the Buddhist sutras and commentaries, reading through all the classic works Buddhist and non-Buddhist and perusing the writings of the wise men of other traditions. It is for that reason the vow states 'the Dharma teachings are infinite, I vow to study them all.'")

As such, while the various Zen traditions today emphasize that enlightenment arises from a direct non-conceptual insight, they also generally accept that study and understanding of the Buddhist teachings support and guide one's practice. (Note: Hakuin goes as far as to state that the buddhat path even starts with study: "[A] person [...] must first gain wide-ranging knowledge, accumulate a treasure-store of wisdom by studying all the Buddhist sutras and commentaries, reading through all the classic works Buddhist and nonBuddhist and perusing the writings of the wise men of other traditions. It is for that reason the vow states 'the Dharma teachings are infinite, I vow to study them all.'") Hori writes that modern Rinzai Zen teachers "do not teach that intellectual understanding has nothing to do with Zen; instead they teach the quite opposite lesson that Zen requires intellectual understanding and literary study". Since the emphasis is generally on a balanced approach to study and practice, the extremes which reject either pole are seen as problematic by most Zen traditions. As Hori writes (referring to the attitude of the modern Rinzai school): "the intellectual understanding of Zen and the experience itself are presented as standing in a complementary, both/and relationship." As such, it is said that the master of Zen uses two swords, the study of the teaching (kyoso) and the experience of the way (doriki).

=== Important scriptures ===
Reading a Sutra by Moonlight, by Ōbaku Zen monk Sokuhi Nyoitsu (1616–1671).

The early Buddhist schools in China were each based on a specific sutra. At the beginning of the Tang dynasty, by the time of the Fifth Patriarch Hongren (601–674), the Zen school became established as a separate school of Buddhism and began to develop its doctrinal position based on the scriptures. Various sutras were used by the early Zen tradition, even before the time of Hongren. They include the Śrīmālādevī Sūtra (Huike), Awakening of Faith (Daoxin), the Lankavatara Sutra (East Mountain School), the Diamond Sutra (Shenhui), and the Platform Sutra (a Chinese composition).

The Chan tradition drew inspiration from a variety of scriptural sources and did not follow any single scripture over the others. Subsequently, the Zen tradition produced a rich corpus of written literature, which has become a part of its practice and teaching. Other influential sutras in Zen are the Vimalakirti Sutra, Avatamsaka Sutra, the Shurangama Sutra, and the Mahaparinirvana Sutra. Important apocryphal sutras composed in China include the Sutra of Perfect Enlightenment and the Vajrasamadhi sutra.

In his analysis of the works of the influential Tang dynasty Hongzhou school, Mario Poceski notes that they cite the following Mahayana sutras often: the Lotus Sutra, the Huayan, the Nirvana, the Laṅkāvatāra, the Prajñāpāramitā sutras, the Mahāratnakūta, the Mahāsamnipāta, and the Vimalakīrti.

=== Literature ===
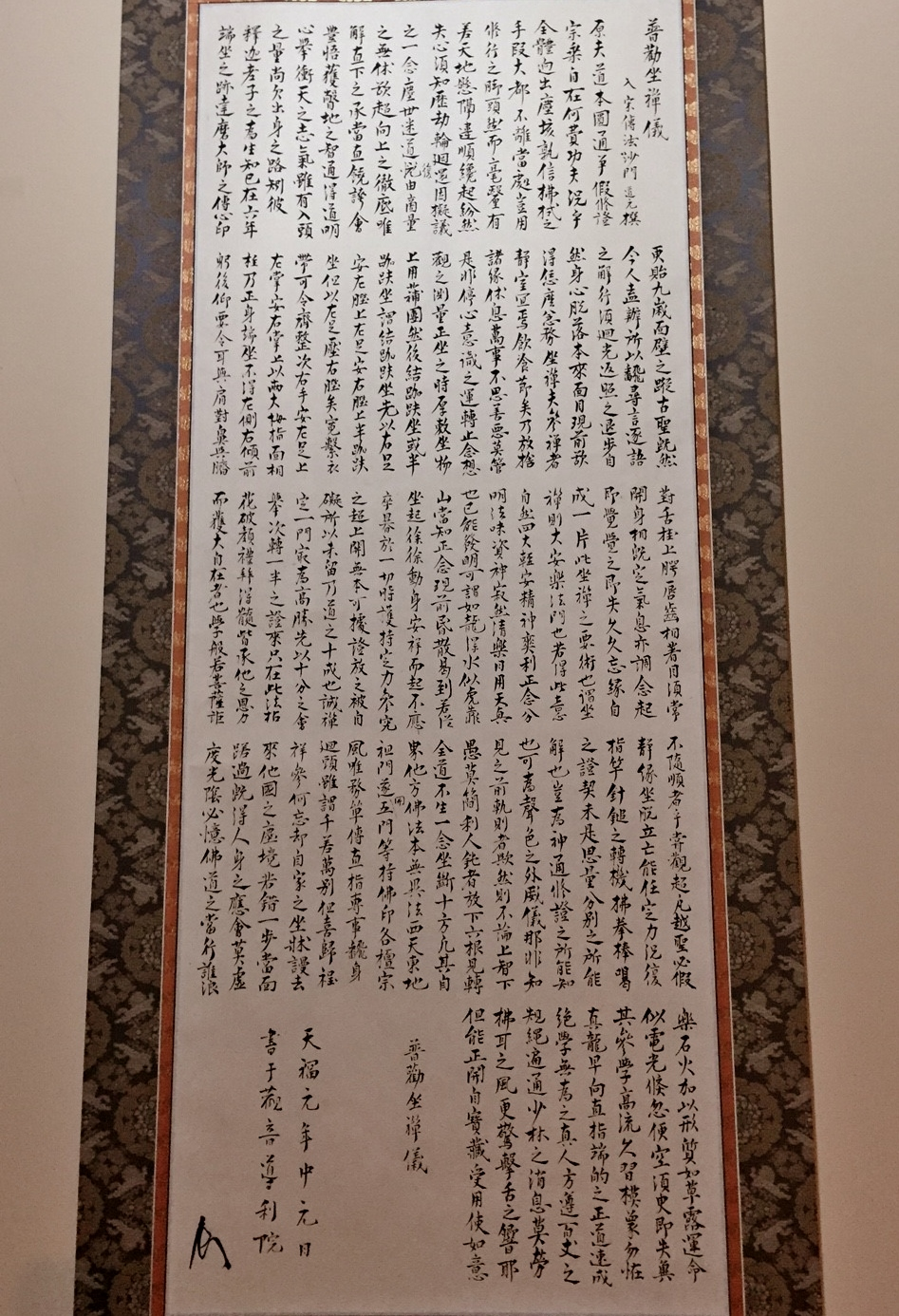
Reproduction of the Tenpuku version of Dogen's Fukanzazengi, originally produced in 1233

Zen developed a rich textual tradition, based on original Zen writings, such as poems, dialogues, histories, and the recorded sayings of Zen masters. Important Zen texts and genres include:

- Zen "sutras" or "scriptures" (Ch: jīng) such as the Platform Sutra, a key work in the development and history of Zen. The Korean Vajrasamadhi sutra is another apocryphal Zen work which calls itself a "sutra".
- Poems or songs, like Faith in Mind, Song of the Precious Mirror Samadhi and Song of Awakening
- Records of Zen transmission and teachings (tenglu), and "encounter dialogues" (ch: jiyuan wenda, jp: kien mondō) such as Masters of the Lankavatara (c. 683-750), Transmission of the Lamp (c. 1004), and Anthology of the Patriarchal Hall (952).
- Recorded sayings of the masters (yulu) like the Record of Mazu, Huangbo's Essential of Mind Transmission, the Linji Yulu and the Yunmen yulu.
- Collections of Zen koans (Ch: gongan), such as the Gateless Barrier, the Book of Equanimity and the Blue Cliff Record.
- Meditation manuals like the Zuochan Yi and the Fukanzazengi .

== History ==
=== Chinese Chan ===
Huike Offering His Arm to Bodhidharma, Sesshū Tōyō (1496).

The history of Chan in China is divided into various periods by different scholars, who generally distinguish a classical phase and a post-classical period. Each period had different schools of Zen, some of which remained influential while others vanished.

Ferguson distinguishes three periods from the 5th century into the 13th century: the Legendary period of the six patriarchs (5th century to the 760s CE); the Classical period of the Hongzhou masters (760s to 950); and the Literary period (950-1250) of Song dynasty Chan which saw the compilation of the gongan-collections and the rise of Linji and Caodong.

McRae distinguishes four rough phases in the history of Chan (though he notes this is only an expedient device and the reality was much more complicated):

1. Proto-Chan (c. 500–600) (Southern and Northern dynasties (420 to 589) and Sui dynasty (589–618 CE)). In this phase, Chan developed in multiple locations in northern China. It was based on the practice of meditation as taught by figures like Bodhidharma and Huike. A key source from this period is the Two Entrances and Four Practices, attributed to Bodhidharma. According to McRae, no known lineage theory existed in Proto-Chan, and the connection between it and the Early Chan tradition (consisting of the East Mountain Teaching, Heze School, and Oxhead school) is unclear.
2. Early Chan (c. 600–900, Tang dynasty c. 618–907 CE). In this phase Chan took its first clear contours. Prime figures are the fifth patriarch Daman Hongren (601–674), his dharma-heir Yuquan Shenxiu (606?–706), the sixth patriarch Huineng (638–713), protagonist of the quintessential Platform Sutra, and Shenhui (670–762), whose propaganda elevated Huineng to the status of sixth patriarch. Major schools are the Northern School, Southern School and Oxhead school.
3. Middle Chan (c. 750–1000, from An Lushan Rebellion c. 755–763 to the Five Dynasties and Ten Kingdoms period (907–960/979)). Major schools include the Hongzhou school, the Heze school, and the Hubei faction (Note: McRae gives no further information on this "Hubei faction". It may be the continuation of Shenxiu's "Northern School". See Nadeau 2012 p.89. Hebei was also the place where the Linji branch of chán arose.) Some key figures include Mazu, Shitou, Huangbo, Linji, Xuefeng Yicun, Zongmi and Yongming Yanshou. A key text from this period is the Anthology of the Patriarchal Hall (952), which includes many "encounter stories", as well as the traditional genealogy of the Chan-school.
4. Song Dynasty Chan (c. 950–1300). This period saw the development of the traditional Zen narrative as well as the rise of the Linji school and the Caodong school. The key figures are Dahui Zonggao (1089–1163), who introduced the Hua Tou practice, and Hongzhi Zhengjue (1091–1157) who emphasized Shikantaza. This era saw the composition of the classic koan-collections (e.g. Blue Cliff Record) which reflect the influence of the literati class on the development of Chan. In this phase Chan is transported to Japan, and exerts a great influence on Korean Seon via Jinul (1158–1210).

Neither Ferguson nor McRae give a periodisation for Chinese Chan following the Song-dynasty, though McRae mentions "at least a post-classical phase or perhaps multiple phases". David McMahan discusses the later Ming (1368–1644) and Qing (1644–1912) era of Chan, which saw increasing syncretism with other traditions, and a later modern phase (19th century onwards) during which Chan adapted western ideas and attempted to modernize in response to the pressure of foreign imperialism.

==== Origins ====
Before the arrival of the "founder" of Chan, Bodhidharma, various Buddhist masters of meditation or dhyana (Ch: channa) had taught in China, including An Shigao and Buddhabhadra. These figures also brought with them various meditation texts, called the Dhyāna sutras which mainly drew from the teachings of the Sarvāstivāda. These early meditation texts laid the groundwork for the practices of Chan Buddhism. The translation work of Kumārajīva (especially his Prajñāpāramitā translations and his Vimalakirti Sutra), Buddhabhadra (Avatamsaka Sutra) and Gunabhadra (Lankāvatāra sūtra) were also key formative influences on Chan and remained key sources for later Chan masters. Indeed, in some early Chan texts (like the Masters of the Lankāvatāra), it is Gunabhadra, not Bodhidharma, which is seen as the first patriarch who transmits the Chan lineage (here seen as synonymous with the Lankāvatāra tradition) from India. The meditation works of the fourth Tiantai patriarch Zhiyi, such as his monumental Mohezhiguan, were also influential on later Chan meditation manuals, like the Tso-chan-i.

A further influence on the origin of Chan Buddhism is Taoism. Some of the earliest Chinese Buddhists were influenced by Daoist thought and terminology and this has led some scholars to see a Taoist influence on Chan. Two Chinese disciples of Kumārajīva, Sengzhao and Daosheng were influenced by Taoist works like the Laozi and Zhuangzi. These figures in turn had an influence on some early Chan masters. Liebenthal notes the undeniable influence Sengzhao had on Chan, observing that allusions to Sengzhao are a common appearance in Chan writings.

When Buddhism came to China from Gandhara (now Afghanistan) and India, it was initially adapted to the Chinese culture and understanding. Buddhism was exposed to Confucianist and Taoistinfluences. (Note: See also The Tao of Zen which argues that Zen is almost entirely grounded in Taoist philosophy, though this fact is well covered by Mahayana Buddhism.) Buddhism was first identified to be "a barbarian variant of Taoism":

Judging from the reception by the Han of the Hinayana works and from the early commentaries, it appears that Buddhism was being perceived and digested through the medium of religious Taoism. Buddha was seen as a foreign immortal who had achieved some form of Daoist nondeath. The Buddhists' mindfulness of the breath was regarded as an extension of Daoist breathing exercises.

Taoist terminology was used to express Buddhist doctrines in the oldest translations of Buddhist texts, a practice termed ko-i, "matching the concepts."The first Buddhist recruits in China were Taoists. They developed high esteem for the newly introduced Buddhist meditational techniques, and blended them with Taoist meditation. It was against this background that the Taoist concept of naturalness was inherited by the early Chan disciples: they equated – to some extent – the ineffable Tao and Buddha-nature, and thus, rather than feeling bound to the abstract "wisdom of the sūtras," emphasized Buddha-nature to be found in "everyday" human life, just like the Tao.

==== Proto-Chan ====
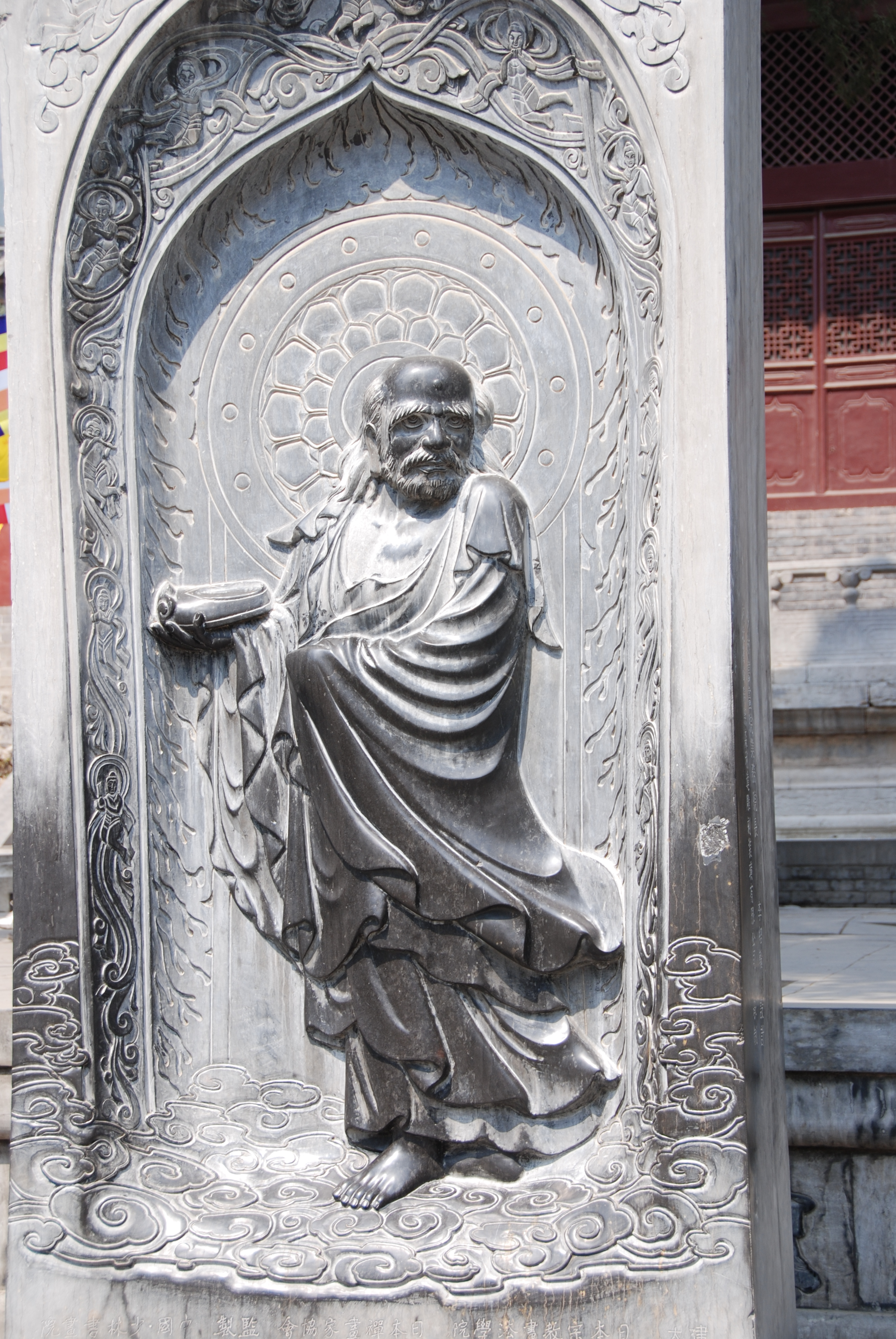
Bodhidharma, stone carving in Shaolin Temple.

Proto-Chan (c. 500–600) encompasses the Southern and Northern dynasties period (420 to 589) and Sui dynasty (589–618 CE). This is the time of the first "patriarchs" of Chan, like Bodhidharma, Seng-fu and Huike. There is little actual historical information about these early figures and most legendary stories about their life come from later, mostly Tang sources. What is known is that they were considered Mahayana meditation masters (chanshi).

An important text from this period is the Two Entrances and Four Practices, found in Dunhuang, and attributed to Bodhidharma. Later sources mention that these figures taught using the Laṅkāvatāra Sūtra though there is no direct evidence of this from the earliest sources. According to John McRae, the earliest Chan sources on these masters show considerable influence from Madhyamaka thought, while the influence from the Laṅkāvatāra is actually much less pronounced. As such, it is questionable if it was there at all with regards to the earliest figures like Bodhidharma and Huike.

==== Early Chan ====
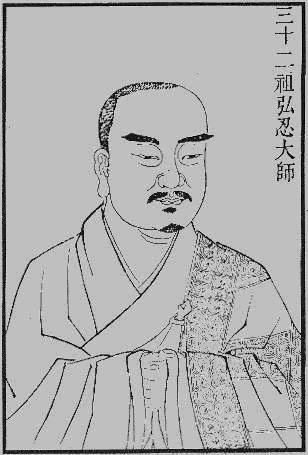
Hóngrěn, the fifth patriarch of Zen

Early Chan refers to early Tang dynasty (618–750) Chan. The fifth patriarch Daman Hongren (601–674), and his dharma-heir Yuquan Shenxiu (606?–706) were influential in founding the first Chan institution in Chinese history, known as the "East Mountain school". Hongren emphasized the meditation practice of "maintaining (guarding) the mind," which focuses on "an awareness of True Mind or Buddha-nature within". Shenxiu was the most influential and charismatic student of Hongren and was considered to be the sixth patriarch by his followers. He was even invited to the Imperial Court by Empress Wu.

Shenxiu also became the target of much criticism by Shenhui (670–762), for his supposedly "gradualist" teachings. Shenhui instead promoted the "sudden" teachings attributed to his teacher Huineng (638–713). Shenhui's propaganda campaign eventually succeeded when he became a key figure in the royal court, elevating Huineng to the status of sixth patriarch of Chinese Chan.

This sudden vs. gradual debate came to define later forms of Chan discourse. This early period also saw the composition of the Platform Sutra, which would become one of the most influential Chan texts of all time. The sutra purports to contain the teachings of the sixth Patriarch Huineng, but modern scholars like Yanagida Seizan now believe that it was redacted over a period of time within the Oxhead school. According to McRae, the text attempts to reconcile the so called "sudden" teachings with the "gradual" teachings of the Northern school.

==== Middle Chan ====
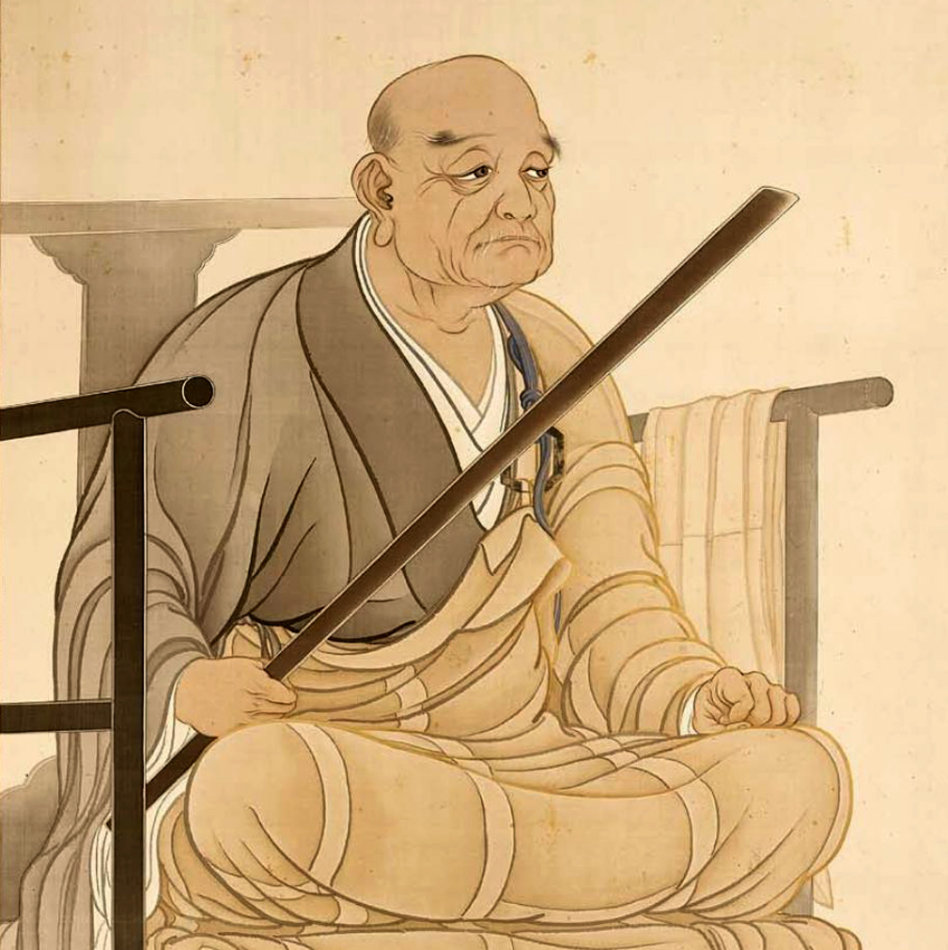
Mazu Daoyi

The Middle Chan (c. 750–1000) phase runs from the An Lushan Rebellion (755–763) to the Five Dynasties and Ten Kingdoms period (907–960/979). This period saw the rise of Chan schools in rural southern China. The most prominent among them was the Hongzhou school of Mazu Daoyi (709–788), which arose in Hunan and Jiangxi.

Other important Hongzhou masters include Dazhu Huihai, Baizhang Huaihai, and Huangbo Xiyun. This school is sometimes seen as the archetypal expression of Chan, with its emphasis on the personal expression of the Buddha-mind in everyday life activities, its use of slang and Chinese vernacular as opposed to classical Chinese, as well as the importance it placed on spontaneous and unconventional "questions and answers during an encounter" (linji wenda) between master and disciple. This period also sees the first Chan monastic code, the Pure Rules of Baizhang.

Some sources depict these masters as highly antinomian and iconoclastic people, who make paradoxical or nonsensical statements, shout at and beat their students to shock them into realization. However, modern scholars have seen much of the literature that presents these "iconoclastic" encounters as being later revisions during the Song era. The Hongzhou masters may not have been as radical as the Song sources depict them to be and they seem to have promoted traditional Buddhist practices like keeping precepts, accumulating good karma and practicing meditation.

There were other important schools of Zen in this period as well, such as the Jìngzhòng school of Zhishen (609–702) and Kim Hwasang which was based in Sichuan, the Baotang school (also in Sichuan), and the more moderate and intellectual Heze lineage of Guifeng Zongmi (780–841). Zongmi, who was also a Huayan patriarch, is known for his critique of the Hongzhou tradition, his sutra commentaries, and for his extensive writings on Chan.

The Great Anti-Buddhist Persecution in 845 was devastating for all schools of metropolitan Chinese Buddhism, but the Chan tradition survived in the rural areas and in the outlying regions. Chan was thus in a position to take a leading role in the later eras of Chinese Buddhism.

During the subsequent Five Dynasties and Ten Kingdoms era, the Hongzhou school gradually split into several regional traditions led by various masters. These eventually became known as the Five Houses of Chan: Guiyang, Caodong, Linji, Fayan and Yunmen. Some schools of this period, particularly that of Linji Yixuan (d. 866), promoted an iconoclastic and often absurd style, with masters often hitting and shouting at students. This period also saw the development of encounter dialogue literature, some of which were retroactively attributed to past Chan masters. An important encounter dialogue text from this period is the Anthology of the Patriarchal Hall (952), which also establishes a genealogy of the Chan school.

==== Song Dynasty Chan ====
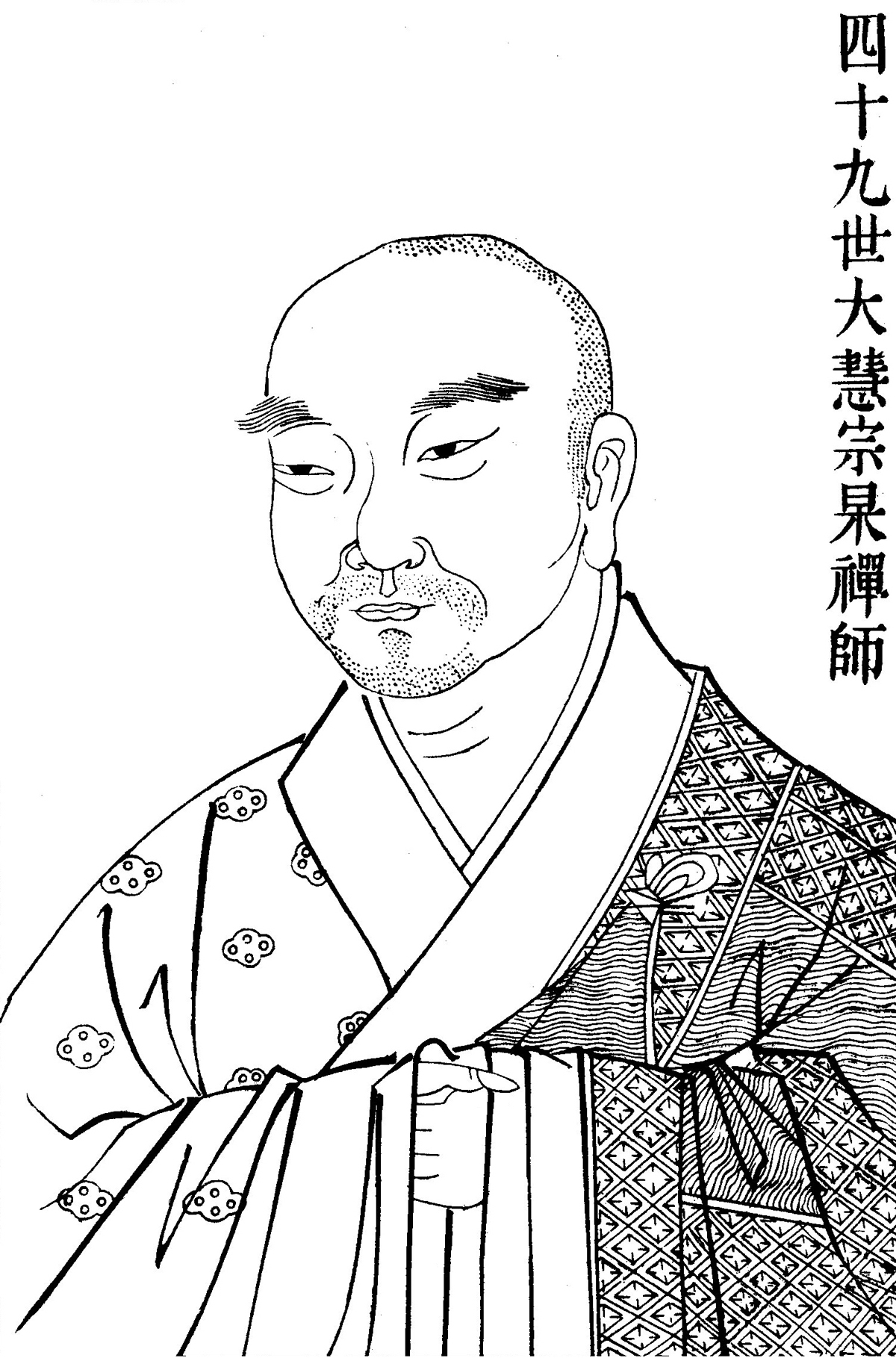
Dahui introduced the method of kan huatou, or "inspecting the critical phrase", of a kōan story. This method was called the "Chan of kōan introspection" (Kanhua Chan).

During Song Dynasty Chan (c. 950–1300), Chan Buddhism became a dominant force. Chan became the largest sect of Chinese Buddhism and had strong ties to the imperial government, which led to the development of a highly organized system of temple rank and administration. The development of printing technology advanced during this era, and Chan works were widely printed and distributed. Furthermore, during this period, Chan literati developed their own idealized history, seeing the Tang era as a "golden age" of Chan. It was also during the Song dynasty, in 1036 CE, that Chan's founding myth linking its transmission to the Flower Sermon first appeared. In spite of the popularity of Chan at this time, it faced increased attack by Neo-Confucian scholars who wrote critiques of Buddhism and dominated the imperial examination system.

The dominant form of Song Chan was the Linji school. This was due to extensive support from the scholar-officials and the imperial court. The Linji school developed the study of gong'an ("public case", Jp: kōan) literature, which depicted stories of master-student encounters that were seen as demonstrations of the awakened mind. Most kōan stories depicted the idealized encounters of past Chan masters, particularly from the Tang era, and show the influence of the Chinese literati class. Some influential kōan texts are the Blue Cliff Record, the Book of Equanimity and The Gateless Gate.

During the 12th century, a rivalry emerged between the Linji and the Caodong schools for the support of Chinese elites. Most well known Linji masters were aligned with either Huanglong Huinan (1002-1069) or Yangqi Fanghui (992-1049), both students of Shishuang Chuyan (986–1039). Yuanwu Keqin (1063-1135) called this the "five families and seven traditions", referring to the five houses and the Huanglong and Yangqi branches of the Linji tradition. Hongzhi Zhengjue (1091–1157) of the Caodong school emphasized silent illumination or serene reflection (mòzhào) as a means for solitary practice, which could be undertaken by lay-followers. The Linji school's Dahui Zonggao (1089–1163) meanwhile, introduced k'an-hua chan ("observing the word-head" chan), which involved meditation on the crucial phrase or "punch line" (hua-tou) of a gong'an.

The Song also saw the syncretism of Chan and Pure Land Buddhism by figures like Yongming Yanshou (904–975), a practice that would become very popular. Yongming also echoed Zongmi's work in indicating that the values of Taoism and Confucianism could also be embraced and integrated into Buddhism. Chan also influenced Neo-Confucianism as well as certain forms of Taoism, such as the Quanzhen school.

During the Song, Chan was also transmitted to Japan by figures Myōan Eisai and Nanpo Shōmyō who studied in China. It also exerted a great influence on Korean Seon via figures like Jinul.

==== Post-Classical Chan ====
Some scholars see the post-classical phase as an "age of syncretism." Various eminent monastics practiced or taught Chan Buddhism alongside the other Chinese Buddhist traditions, sometimes integrating them together. A notable example is the increasing popularity of the dual practice of Chan and Pure Land Buddhism (known as Nianfo Chan) during this period, as seen in the teachings of Zhongfeng Mingben (1263–1323), Hanshan Deqing (1546–1623) and Ouyi Zhixu (1599–1655). This became a widespread phenomenon and in time much of the distinction between them was lost, with many monasteries teaching both Chan meditation and the Pure Land practice of nianfo. Another prominent example is Ouyi Zhixu, who was a Patriarch of both the Chinese Pure Land and the Tiantai traditions in addition to being a Chan practitioner; he also wrote works expounding on the Weishi teachings. As another example, Hanshan Deqing was also a famed Chan master whose teachings drew heavily upon Huayan, Tiantai and Weishi thoughts. The Ming dynasty also saw the efforts of figures such as Yunqi Zhuhong (1535–1615) and Daguan Zhenke (1543–1603) to revive and reconcile Chan Buddhism with the practice of Buddhist scriptural study and writing. This non-sectarian and syncretic style of Chan Buddhism which drew on all facets of Chinese Buddhism was so dominant at this time, that all Chinese monks were affiliated a Chan school during the Ming.

In the beginning of the Qing dynasty, the highly influential teacher Miyun Yuanwu (1566–1642) began a revival of the Linji school style. Miyun's students had a broad impact on Chinese Chan, as well as on Japanese Zen and Vietnamese Thiền.

==== Modern era ====
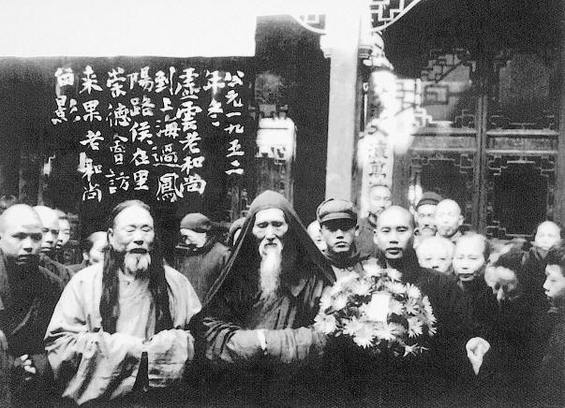
Chan masters Xuyun and Laiguo. Xuyun was one of the most influential Chan Buddhists of the 19th and 20th centuries.

After having experienced a decline by the end of the Qing dynasty (1644–1912), Chan activity was reinvigorated again in the 19th and 20th centuries by a flurry of modernist activity. This period saw the rise of worldly Chan activism, what is sometimes called Humanistic Buddhism (or more literally "Buddhism for human life", rensheng fojiao), promoted by figures like Jing'an (1851–1912), Yuanying (1878–1953), Taixu (1890–1947), Xuyun (1840–1959) and Yinshun (1906–2005). These figures promoted social activism to address issues such as poverty and social injustice, as well as participation in political movements. They also promoted modern science and scholarship, including the use of the methods of modern critical scholarship to study the history of Chan.

Many Chan teachers today trace their lineage back to Xuyun, including Sheng-yen and Hsuan Hua, who have propagated Chan in the West where it has grown steadily through the 20th and 21st centuries. Chan Buddhism was repressed in China during the 1960s in the Cultural Revolution, but in the subsequent reform and opening up period in the 1970s, a revival of Chinese Buddhism has been taking place on the mainland, while Buddhism has a significant following in Taiwan and Hong Kong as well as among Overseas Chinese.

=== Spread outside of China ===
==== Vietnamese Thiền ====
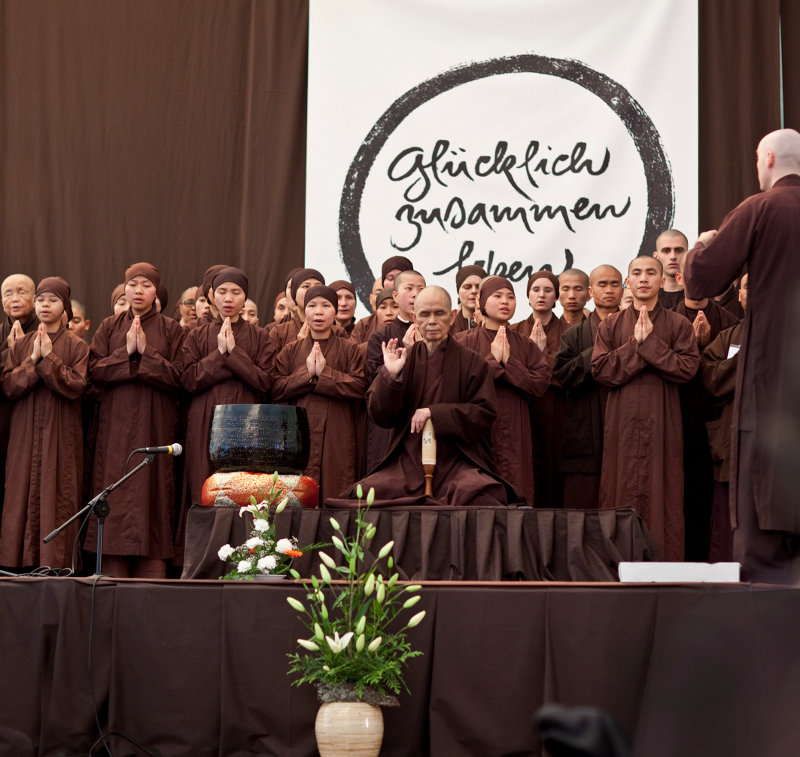
Thích Nhất Hạnh leading a namo avalokiteshvaraya chanting session with monastics from his Order of Interbeing, Germany 2010

Chan was introduced to Vietnam during the early Chinese occupation periods (111 BCE to 939 CE) as Thiền. During the Lý (1009–1225) and Trần (1225 to 1400) dynasties, Thiền rose to prominence among the elites and the royal court and a new native tradition was founded, the Trúc Lâm ("Bamboo Grove") school, which also contained Confucian and Taoist influences. In the 17th century, the Linji school was brought to Vietnam as the Lâm Tế, which also mixed Chan and Pure land. Lâm Tế remains the largest monastic order in the country today.

Modern Vietnamese Thiền is influenced by Buddhist modernism. Important figures include Thiền master Thích Thanh Từ (1924–), the activist and popularizer Thích Nhất Hạnh (1926–2022) and the philosopher Thích Thiên-Ân. Vietnamese Thiền is eclectic and inclusive, bringing in many practices such as breath meditation, nianfo, mantra, Theravada influences, chanting, sutra recitation and engaged Buddhism activism.

==== Korean Seon ====
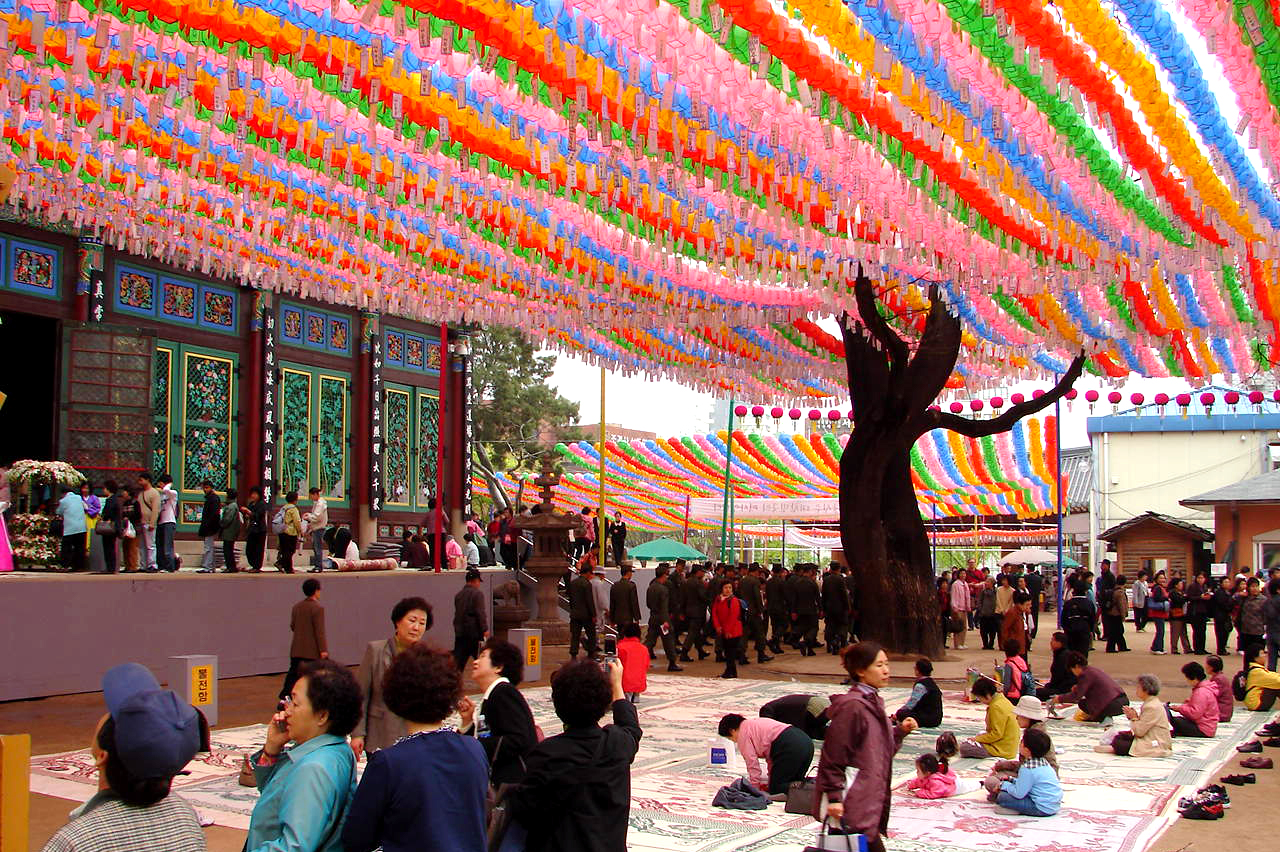
Jogyesa is the headquarters of the Jogye Order. The temple was first established in 1395, at the dawn of the Joseon dynasty.

Seon (선) was gradually transmitted into Korea during the late Silla period (7th through 9th centuries) as Korean monks travelled to China and returned home to establish the initial Seon schools of Korea, which were known as the "nine mountain schools". Seon received its most significant impetus and consolidation from the Goryeo monk Jinul (1158–1210), who is considered the most influential figure in the formation of the mature Seon school. Jinul founded the Jogye Order, which remains the largest Seon tradition in Korea today, as well as the important Songgwangsa temple. Jinul also wrote extensive works on Seon, developing a comprehensive system of thought and practice.

Buddhism was mostly suppressed during the strictly Confucian Joseon dynasty (1392–1910), and the number of monasteries and clergy sharply declined. The period of Japanese occupation also brought numerous modernist ideas and changes to Korean Seon. Some monks began to adopt the Japanese practice of marrying and having families, while others such as Yongseong, worked to resist the Japanese occupation. Today, the largest Seon school, the Jogye, enforces celibacy, while the second largest, the Taego Order, allows for married priests. Important modernist figures that influenced contemporary Seon include Seongcheol and Gyeongheo. Seon has also been transmitted to West, with new traditions such as the Kwan Um School of Zen.

==== Japanese Zen ====
Sojiji Temple, of the Soto Zen school, Tsurumi-ku, Yokohama, Japan

Zen was not introduced as a separate school until the 12th century, when Myōan Eisai traveled to China and returned to establish a Linji lineage, which eventually perished. Decades later, Nanpo Shōmyō (1235–1308) also studied Linji teachings in China before founding the Japanese Otokan lineage, the most influential and only surviving lineage of Rinzai in Japan. In 1215, Dōgen, a younger contemporary of Eisai's, journeyed to China himself, where he became a disciple of the Caodong master Tiantong Rujing. After his return, Dōgen established the Sōtō school, the Japanese branch of Caodong.

The three traditional schools of Zen in contemporary Japan are the Sōtō (曹洞), Rinzai (臨済), and Ōbaku (黃檗). The schools are further divided into subschools by head temple, with two head temples for Sōtō (Sōji-ji and Eihei-ji), fourteen head temples for Rinzai, and one head temple (Manpuku-ji) for Ōbaku. Besides these traditional organizations, there are newer modern Zen organizations that have especially attracted Western lay followers, namely the Sanbo Kyodan and the FAS Society.

==== Zen in the West ====
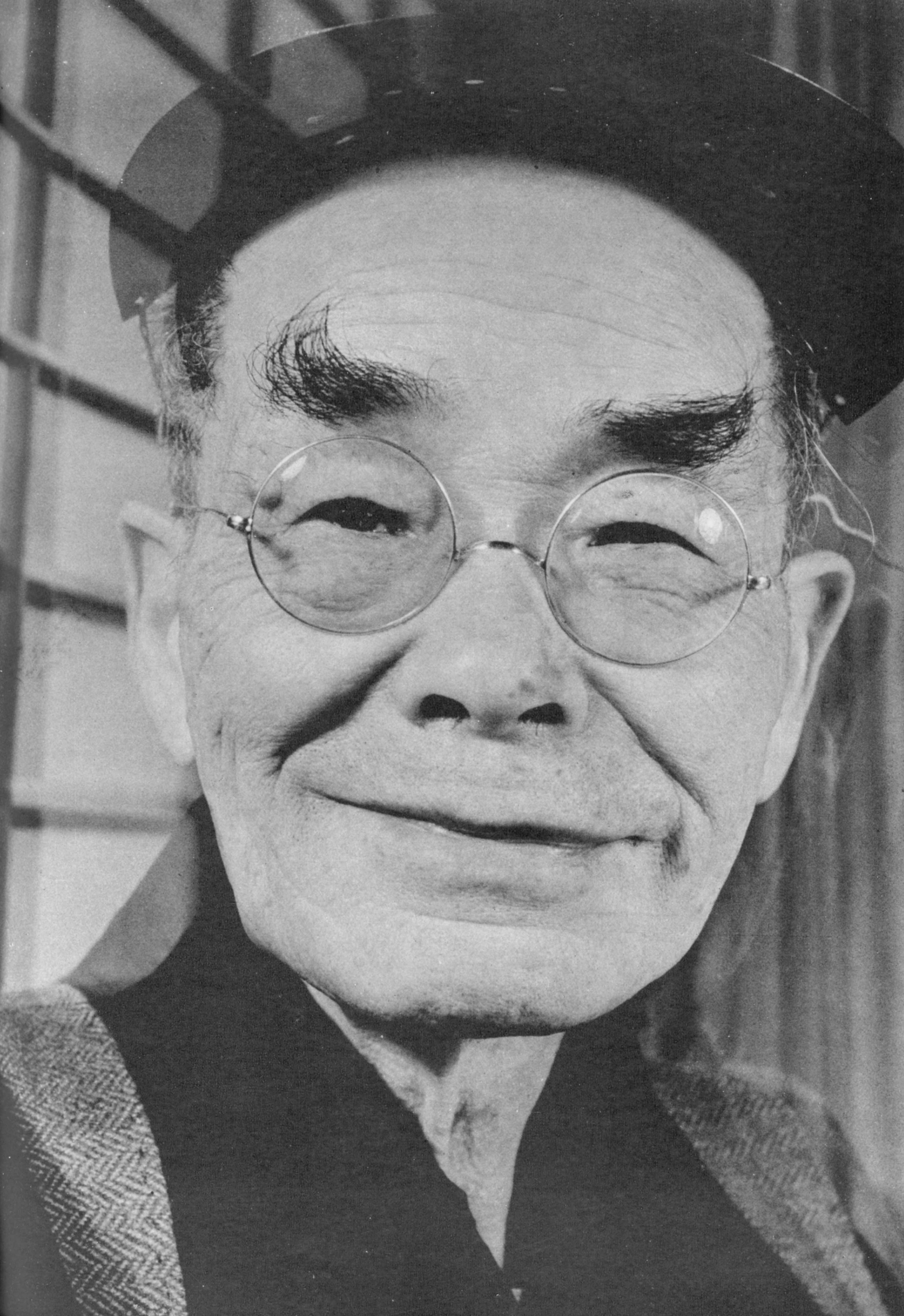
D.T. Suzuki

Various Zen traditions were transmitted to the West in the 20th century. Important Asian figures in this transmission include Soyen Shaku, D. T. Suzuki, Nyogen Senzaki, Sokei-an, Shunryu Suzuki, Taizan Maezumi, Hsuan Hua, Sheng-yen, Seung Sahn, Taisen Deshimaru, Thích Thiên-Ân and Thích Nhất Hạnh. Among the first Western Zen teachers were Ruth Fuller Sasaki, Philip Kapleau, Robert Baker Aitkin, Walter Nowick, Brigitte D'Ortschy, Hōun Jiyu-Kennett and Myokyo-ni. Zen became more popular in the West when authors including Jack Kerouac, Allen Ginsberg, Alan Watts, Gary Snyder, Erich Fromm, Robert Pirsig and Eugen Herrigel wrote on and promoted Zen. There are currently numerous Zen centers from various traditions in the Western world, including Rinzai, Sōtō, Plum Village, Chinese Chan and Kwan Um.

== Narratives ==
The Chan of the Tang dynasty, especially that of Mazu and Linji with its antinomian sayings and emphasis on "shock techniques," was retrospectively seen as a "golden age" of Chan by later Chan authors. As Mario Poceski writes, Song dynasty texts like the Record of the Transmission of the Lamp (c. 1004) depict the past masters as iconoclastic sages who embraced radical and transgressive practices like shouting, beating their students and making paradoxical statements. However, these iconoclastic stories cannot be traced back to Tang era sources, and as such, they should be seen as apocryphal lore. This traditional Zen narrative became dominant during the Song, when Chan became the dominant form of Buddhism in China, due to support from the Imperial Court and the scholar-official class.

Another important element of the traditional Zen narrative is that Zen is an unbroken lineage that has transmitted the enlightened Buddha-mind from the time of Shakyamuni Buddha to the present. This narrative is traditionally supported through Zen histories and Zen lineage charts, which developed in China throughout several centuries until they became canonized in the Song.

The traditional picture of the ancient iconoclastic Zen masters has gained great popularity in the West in the 20th century, especially due to the influence of D.T. Suzuki, and Hakuun Yasutani. This traditional narrative has been challenged, and complemented, since the 1970s by modern academic research on Zen history and pre-Song sources.

Modern scientific research on the history of Zen discerns three main narratives concerning Zen, its history and its teachings: Traditional Zen Narrative (TZN), Buddhist Modernism (BM), Historical and Cultural Criticism (HCC). An external narrative is Nondualism, which claims Zen to be a token of a universal nondualist essence of religions.

== See also ==
- List of Buddhists
- Outline of Buddhism
- Timeline of Buddhism
- Chinese Chan
- 101 Zen Stories
- Chinso
- Shussan Shaka
- Katsu

== Sources ==
=== Printed sources ===
- Abe, Masao (1989), Zen and Western Thought, translated by William R. LeFleur, University of Hawaii Press
- Abe, Masao; Heine, Steven (1996), Zen and Comparative Studies, University of Hawaii Press
- Addiss, Stephen; Loori, John Daido, The Zen Art Book: The Art of Enlightenment
- Aitken, Robert (1994), Foreword to "A Buddhist Bible", Boston, Massachusetts: Beacon Press
- Anderson, Reb (2000), Being Upright: Zen Meditation and the Bodhisattva Precepts, Rodmell Press
- Arokiasamy, Arul M. (2005), Zen: Awakening to Your Original Face, Chennai, India: Thiruvanmiyur
- Batchelor, Martine (2004), The Path Of Compassion: The Bodhisattva Precepts, Rowman Altamira
- Bell, Sandra (2002), "Scandals in emerging Western Buddhism" (PDF), Westward Dharma: Buddhism beyond Asia, Berkeley, CA: University of California Press, pp. 230–242, archived (PDF) from the original on 27 February 2021
- Benesch, Oleg (2016), Reconsidering Zen, Samurai, and the Martial Arts, The Asia Pacific Journal: Japan Focus, archived from the original on 16 September 2016
- Bodiford, William M. (1992), "Zen in the Art of Funerals: Ritual Salvation in Japanese Buddhism", History of Religions, 32 (2): 150, doi:10.1086/463322, S2CID 161648097
- Bodiford, William M. (1993), Sōtō Zen in Medieval Japan, University of Hawaii Press, ISBN 0-8248-1482-7
- Bodiford, William M. "Koan practice". In Loori (2006).
- Borup, Jørn (2008), Japanese Rinzai Zen Buddhism: Myōshinji, a Living Religion, Brill Publishers
- Braak, Andre van der. Reimagining Zen in a Secular age: Charles Taylor and Zen Buddhism in the West (Brill Rodopi, 2020) online review Archived 19 March 2022 at the Wayback Machine
- Broughton, Jeffrey L. (1999), The Bodhidharma Anthology: The Earliest Records of Zen, Berkeley: University of California Press, ISBN 0-520-21972-4
- Broughton, Jeffrey (2009), Zongmi on Chan, New York: Columbia University Press, ISBN 978-0-231-14392-9
- Brown Holt, Linda (1995), "From India to China: Transformations in Buddhist Philosophy", Qi: The Journal of Traditional Eastern Health & Fitness, archived from the original on 4 June 2012
- Buswell, Robert E. "The "Short-cut" Approach of K'an-hua Meditation: The Evolution of a Practical Subitism in Chinese Ch'an Buddhism". In Gregory (1991).
- Buswell, Robert E. "Ch'an Hermeneutics: A Korean View". In Lopez (1993).
- Buswell; Lopez (2014), The Princeton Dictionary of Buddhism, Princeton University Press
- Blyth, R. H. (1966), Zen and Zen Classics, Volume 4, Tokyo: Hokuseido Press
- Chappell, David W. "Hermeneutical Phases in Chinese Buddhism". In Lopez (1993).
- Cheng, Hsueh-Li (1981), "The Roots of zen Buddhism", Journal of Chinese Philosophy, 8 (4): 451–478, doi:10.1111/j.1540-6253.1981.tb00267.x, archived from the original on 2 June 2019
- Cheng Chien Bhikshu (1992), "Introduction", Sun-Face Buddha. The Teachings of Ma-tsu and the Hung-chou School of Ch'an, Asian Humanities Press
- Cleary, Thomas (2010), Translator's introduction. The Undying Lamp of Zen. The Testament of Zen Master Torei, Boston & London: Shambhala Publications
- Collins, Randall (2000), The Sociology of Philosophies: A Global Theory of Intellectual Change, Harvard University Press
- Dumoulin, Heinrich (2000), A History of Zen Buddhism, New Delhi: Munshiram Manoharlal Publishers Pvt. Ltd.
- Dumoulin, Heinrich (2005a), Zen Buddhism: A History. Volume 1: India and China, World Wisdom Books, ISBN 978-0-941532-89-1
- Dumoulin, Heinrich (2005b), Zen Buddhism: A History. Volume 2: Japan, World Wisdom Books, ISBN 978-0-941532-90-7
- Hori, Victor Sogen (2005), Introduction, Zen Buddhism: A History (PDF), by Dumoulin, Heinrich, vol. 2: Japan, translated by Heisig, James W.; Knitter, Paul, World Wisdom Books, p. xiii–xxi, ISBN 978-0-941532-90-7, archived (PDF) from the original on 9 March 2012
- Faure, Bernard (2000), Visions of Power. Imaging Medieval Japanese Buddhism, Princeton, New Jersey: Princeton University Press
- Ferguson, Andy (2000), Zen's Chinese Heritage, Boston, MA: Wisdom Publications, ISBN 0-86171-163-7
- Fischer-Schreiber, Ingrid; Ehrhard, Franz-Karl; Diener, Michael S. (2008), Lexicon Boeddhisme. Wijsbegeerte, religie, psychologie, mystiek, cultuur en literatuur, Asoka
- Fischer-Schreiber, Ingrid; Ehrhard, Franz-Karl; Diener, Michael S. (1991), The Shambhala dictionary of Buddhism and Zen, Translated by M. H. Kohn, Boston: Shambhala
- Ford, James Myoun, A Note On Dharma Transmission And The Institutions Of Zen, archived from the original on 20 January 2012
- Foulk, T. Griffith (n.d.), History of the Soto Zen School, archived from the original on 16 May 2012
- Fowler, Merv (2005), Zen Buddhism: Beliefs and Practices, Sussex Academic Press, ISBN 978-1-902210-42-1, archived from the original on 14 January 2023
- Gimello, Robert M. (1994), Marga and Culture: Learning, Letters, and Liberation in Northern Sung Ch'an. In: Buswell & Gimello (editors)(1994), Paths to Liberation. Pages 475–505, Delhi: Motilal Banarsidass Publishers
- Goddard, Dwight (2007), "History of Ch'an Buddhism previous to the times of Hui-neng (Wie-lang)", A Buddhist Bible, Forgotten Books, ISBN 978-1-60506-104-7, archived from the original on 14 January 2023
- Gregory, Peter N., ed. (1991). Sudden and Gradual. Approaches to Enlightenment in Chinese Thought. Delhi: Motilal Banarsidass Publishers.
- Gregory, Peter N. (1991a). "Sudden Enlightenment Followed by Gradual Cultivation: Tsung-mi's Analysis of mind". In Gregory (1991).
- Gregory, Peter N. "What Happened to the "Perfect Teaching"? Another lOok at Hua-yen Buddhist hermeneutics". In Lopez (1993).
- Gregory, Peter N. (1995), Inquiry into the Origin of Humanity: An Annotated Translation of Tsung-mi's Yüan jen lun with a Modern Commentary, Hawaii: University of Hawai’i Press, Kuroda Institute, ISBN 0-8248-1764-8
- Gregory, Peter N. (2002), Tsung-Mi and the Sinification of Buddhism, Hawaii: University of Hawai’i Press
- Grigg, Ray (1994), The Tao Of Zen, Charles E. Tuttle Company
- Harvey, Peter (1995), An introduction to Buddhism. Teachings, history and practices, Cambridge University Press
- Haskel, Peter (1984), Bankei Zen. Translations from The Record of Bankei, New York: Grove Weidenfeld
- Heine, Steven; Wright, Dale S. (2000). The Koan: Texts and Contexts in Zen Buddhism. Oxford University Press. ISBN 0-19-511748-4.
- Heine, Steven (2007), "A Critical Survey of Works on Zen since Yampolsky.", Philosophy East & West, 57 (4): 577–592, doi:10.1353/pew.2007.0047, S2CID 170450246
- Heine, Steven; Wright, Dale S., eds. (2008). Zen Ritual: Studies of Zen Buddhist Theory in Practice. USA: Oxford University Press.
- Heine, Steven (2008), Zen Skin, Zen Marrow
- Hisamatsu, Shin'ichi; Gishin Tokiwa; Christopher Ives (2002), Critical Sermons of the Zen Tradition: Hisamatsu's Talks on Linji, University of Hawaii Press
- Hori, Victor Sogen (1994), "Teaching and Learning in the Zen Rinzai Monastery" (PDF), Journal of Japanese Studies, 20 (1): 5–35, doi:10.2307/132782, JSTOR 132782, archived from the original on 7 July 2018
- Hori, Victor Sogen. "Koan and Kensho in the Rinzai Zen Curriculum". In Heine & Wright (2000).
  - Hsing, Yun (1999), Being Good: Buddhist Ethics for Everyday Life., New York: Weatherhill
- Hu Shih (1953), "Ch'an (Zen) Buddhism in China. Its History and Method", Philosophy East & West, 3 (1): 3–24, doi:10.2307/1397361, JSTOR 1397361, archived from the original on 17 February 2020
- Huaijin, Nan (1997), Basic Buddhism: Exploring Buddhism and Zen, York Beach: Samuel Weiser
- Isshū, Miura; Sasaki, Ruth F. (1993), The Zen Koan, New York: Harcourt Brace & Company, ISBN 0-15-699981-1
- Jaksch, Mary (2007), The Road to Nowhere. Koans and the Deconstruction of the Zen Saga (PDF), archived (PDF) from the original on 20 February 2012
- Jorgensen, John (1991), "Heinrich Dumoulin's Zen Buddhism: A History", Japanese Journal of Religious Studies, 18 (4), doi:10.18874/jjrs.18.4.1991.377-400
- Kalupahana, David J. (1992), The Principles of Buddhist Psychology, Delhi: ri Satguru Publications
- Kalupahana, David J. (1994), A history of Buddhist philosophy, Delhi: Motilal Banarsidass Publishers Private Limited
- Kapleau, Philip (1989), The three pillars of Zen
- Kasulis, Thomas P. (2021), Zen Action/Zen Person, Hawaii: University of Hawaii Press
- Kasulis, Thomas P. (2003), Ch'an Spirituality. In: Buddhist Spirituality. Later China, Korea, Japan and the Modern World; edited by Takeuchi Yoshinori, Delhi: Motilal Banarsidass
- Katz, Jerry (2007), One: Essential Writings on Nonduality, Sentient Publications
- Koné, Alioune (2000), Zen In Europe: A Survey of the Territory, archived from the original on 7 May 2012
- Lachs, Stuart (1999), Means of Authorization: Establishing Hierarchy in Ch'an /Zen Buddhism in America, archived from the original on 19 March 2022
- Lachs, Stuart (2002), Richard Baker and the Myth of the Zen Roshi, archived from the original on 5 February 2012
- Lachs, Stuart (2006), The Zen Master in America: Dressing the Donkey with Bells and Scarves, archived from the original on 20 January 2012
- Lachs, Stuart (2011), When the Saints Go Marching In: Modern Day Zen Hagiography (PDF), archived (PDF) from the original on 20 January 2012
- Lachs, Stuart (2012), Hua-t'ou : A Method of Zen Meditation (PDF), archived (PDF) from the original on 21 September 2013
- Lai, Whalen (1985), "Ma-Tsu Tao-I And The Unfolding Of Southern Zen", Japanese Journal of Religious Studies, 12 (2/3): 173–192, doi:10.18874/jjrs.12.2-3.1985.173-192, archived from the original on 13 March 2012
- Lai, Whalen (2003), Buddhism in China: A Historical Survey. In Antonio S. Cua (ed.): Encyclopedia of Chinese Philosophy (PDF), New York: Routledge, archived from the original (PDF) on 12 November 2014
- Lathouwers, Ton (2000), Meer dan een mens kan doen. Zentoespraken, Rotterdam: Asoka
- Leighton, Taigen Dan (2000). Cultivating the Empty Field: The Silent Illumination of Zen Master Hongzhi. Tuttle Library of Enlightenment. Tuttle Publishing. ISBN 978-1-4629-1652-8.
- Liang-Chieh (1986), The Record of Tung-shan, translated by William F. Powell, Kuroda Institute
- Lievens, Bavo (1981), Ma-tsu. De gesprekken, Bussum: Het Wereldvenster
- Loori, John Daido (2006), Sitting with Koans: Essential Writings on Zen Koan Introspection, Somerville, MA: Wisdom Publications, ISBN 0-86171-369-9
- Lopez, Donald S. Jr., ed. (1993). Buddhist Hermeneutics. Delhi: Motilal Banarsidass.
- Loy, David (1988), Nonduality: A Study in Comparative Philosophy, New Haven, Conn: Yale University Press, ISBN 1-57392-359-1
- Low, Albert (2000), Zen and the Sutras, Boston: Turtle Publishing
- Low, Albert (2006), Hakuin on Kensho. The Four Ways of Knowing, Boston & London: Shambhala
- Maezumi, Taizan; Glassman, Bernie (2007), The Hazy Moon of Enlightenment, Wisdom Publications
- Matthiessen, Peter (1987), Nine-headed dragon river: Zen journals, 1969–1985, Shambhala
- McMahan, David L. (2008), The Making of Buddhist Modernism, Oxford University Press, ISBN 978-0-19-518327-6
- McRae, John (1986), The Northern School and the Formation of Early Chʻan Buddhism, University of Hawaii Press
- McRae, John. "Shen-hui and the Teaching of Sudden Enlightenment in Early Ch'an Buddhism". In Gregory (1991).
- McRae, John (2003), Seeing through Zen. Encounter, Transformation, and Genealogy in Chinese Chan Buddhism, University of California Press, ISBN 978-0-520-23798-8
- McRae, John (2004), The Sutra of Queen Śrīmālā of the Lion's Roar and the Vimalakīrti Sutra (PDF), Berkeley, CA: Numata Center for Buddhist Translation and Research, ISBN 1-886439-31-1, archived from the original (PDF) on 12 September 2014
- McRae, John (2005), Critical introduction by John McRae to the reprint of Dumoulin's A history of Zen (PDF), archived (PDF) from the original on 11 November 2011
- McRae, John (2008), The Platform Sutra of the Sixth Patriarch, translated from the Chinese of Zongbao (Taishō Volume 48, Number 2008) (PDF), archived from the original (PDF) on 22 August 2012
- Meinert, Carman, ed. (2015), Transfer of Buddhism Across Central Asian Networks (7th to 13th Centuries), BRILL
- Meng-Tat Chia, Jack (2011), "A Review of Enlightenment in Dispute: The Reinvention of Chan Buddhism in Seventeenth-Century China" (PDF), Journal of Buddhist Ethics, 18, archived (PDF) from the original on 29 January 2012
- Moore, Charles A. (1982), The Japanese Mind: Essentials of Japanese Philosophy and Culture, University of Hawaii Press
- Mumon, Yamada (2004), The Ten Oxherding Pictures, translated by Victor Sōgen Hori, University of Hawai'i Press
- Muller, A. Charles, ed. (n.d.), Digital Dictionary of Buddhism
- Nadeau, Randall L. (2012), The Wiley-Blackwell Companion to Chinese Religions, John Wiley & Sons
- Newland, Guy (2001), Schijn en werkelijkheid. De twee waarheden in de vier boeddhistische leerstelsels, KunchabPublicaties
- Oh, Kang-nam (2000), "The Taoist Influence on Hua-yen Buddhism: A Case of the Scinicization of Buddhism in China", Chung-Hwa Buddhist Journal (13), archived from the original on 21 August 2012
- Orzech, Charles D.; Sørensen, Henrik Hjort; Payne, Richard Karl (2011). Esoteric Buddhism and the Tantras in East Asia. Leiden: BRILL. ISBN 978-90-04-20401-0. OCLC 731667667.
- Pajin, Dusan (1988), "On Faith in Mind – Translation and Analysis of the Hsin Hsin Ming", Journal of Oriental Studies, 26 (2): 270–288
- Poceski, Mario (2007), Ordinary Mind as the Way: The Hongzhou School and the Growth of Chan Buddhism, Oxford University Press
- Poceski, Mario (n.d.), Attitudes Towards Canonicity and Religious Authority in Tang Chan, archived from the original on 14 April 2012
- Sato, Kemmyō Taira, D.T. Suzuki and the Question of War (PDF), archived (PDF) from the original on 25 October 2014
- Sasaki, Ruth Fuller (2009), The Record of Linji. Translation and commentary by Ruth Fuller Sasaki. Edited by Thomas Yūhō Kirchner (PDF), Honolulu: University of Hawai'i Press, archived from the original (PDF) on 22 June 2012
- Schlütter, Morten (2008), How Zen became Zen. The Dispute over Enlightenment and the Formation of Chan Buddhism in Song-Dynasty China, Honolulu: University of Hawai'i Press, ISBN 978-0-8248-3508-8
- Sekida, Katsuki (1989), Zen Training: Methods and Philosophy, Shambhala
- Sekida, Katuski (1996), Two Zen Classics. Mumonkan, the gateless gate. Hekiganroku, the blue cliff record, New York & Tokyo: Weatherhill
- Shahar, Meir (2008), The Shaolin Monastery: History, Religion, and the Chinese Martial Arts, University of Hawaii Press
- Sharf, Robert H. (1993), "The Zen of Japanese Nationalism", History of Religions, 33 (1): 1–43, doi:10.1086/463354, S2CID 161535877, archived from the original on 29 December 2020
- Sharf, Robert H. (1995a), Whose Zen? Zen Nationalism Revisited (PDF), archived (PDF) from the original on 2 February 2019
- Sharf, Robert H. (1995b), "Buddhist Modernism and the Rhetoric of Meditative Experience" (PDF), NUMEN, 42 (3): 228–283, doi:10.1163/1568527952598549, hdl:2027.42/43810, archived (PDF) from the original on 12 April 2019
- Sharf, Robert H. (1995c), "Sanbokyodan. Zen and the Way of the New Religions" (PDF), Japanese Journal of Religious Studies, 22 (3–4), doi:10.18874/jjrs.22.3-4.1995.417-458, archived (PDF) from the original on 16 March 2012
- Sharf, Robert (2014), "Mindfullness and Mindlessness in Early Chan", Philosophy East & West, 64 (4): 933–964, doi:10.1353/pew.2014.0074, S2CID 144208166, archived from the original on 21 June 2022
- Shimano, Eido T. (1991), Points of Departure: Zen Buddhism With a Rinzai View, Livingston Manor, NY: The Zen Studies Society Press, ISBN 0-9629246-0-1
- Shohaku Okumura (2012). Living by Vow: A Practical Introduction to Eight Essential Zen Chants and Texts. Simon and Schuster.
- Snelling, John (1987), The Buddhist handbook. A Complete Guide to Buddhist Teaching and Practice, London: Century Paperbacks
- Stein, R.A. "Sudden Illumination or Simultaneous Comprehension: Remarks on Chinese and Tibetan Terminology". In Gregory (1991).
- Suzuki, D.T. (1932), The Lankavatara Sutra: A Mahayana text, London: Routledge & Kegen Paul
- Suzuki, Shunryu (1997), Branching streams flow in the darkness: Zen talks on the Sandokai, University of California Press, ISBN 978-0-520-22226-7, archived from the original on 14 January 2023
- Swanson, Paul L. (1993), "The Spirituality of Emptiness in Early chinese Buddhism", in Takeuchi Yoshinori (ed.), Buddhist Spirituality. Indian, Southeast Asian, Tibetan, Early Chinese, New York: Crossroad
- Pocescki, Mario (2007), Ordinary Mind as the Way: The Hongzhou School and the Growth of Chan Buddhism, Oxford: Oxford University Press
- Tetsuo, Otani (2003), To Transmit Dogen Zenji's Dharma (PDF), archived (PDF) from the original on 25 January 2013
- Tomoaki, Tsuchida (2003), "The Monastic spirituality of Zen Master Dogen", in Takeuchi Yoshinori (ed.), Buddhist Spirituality. Indian, Southeast Asian, Tibetan, Early Chinese, Delhi: Motilal Banarsidass
- Torei (2010), The Undying Lamp of Zen. The Testament of Zen Master Torei, translated by Thomas Cleary, Boston & London: Shambhala
- Tweed, Thomas A. (2005), "American Occultism and Japanese Buddhism. Albert J. Edmunds, D. T. Suzuki, and Translocative History" (PDF), Japanese Journal of Religious Studies, 32 (2): 249–281, archived from the original (PDF) on 22 May 2012
- Verstappen, Stefan H. (2004), Blind Zen, Red Mansion Pub, ISBN 978-1-891688-03-4, archived from the original on 14 January 2023
- Victoria, Brian Daizen (2006), Zen at war (2nd ed.), Lanham e.a.: Rowman & Littlefield Publishers, Inc.
- Victoria, Brian Daizen (2010), "The "Negative Side" of D. T. Suzuki's Relationship to War" (PDF), The Eastern Buddhist, 41 (2): 97–138, archived (PDF) from the original on 20 January 2012
- Waddell, Norman (2010), Foreword to "Wild Ivy: The Spiritual Autobiography of Zen Master Hakuin", Shambhala Publications
- Waddell, Norman (2010a), Foreword to "The Essential Teachings of Zen Master Hakuin: A Translation of the Sokko-roku Kaien-fusetsu", Shambhala Publications
- "The Diamond Sutra", A Buddhist Bible, translated by Wai-tao, Boston, Massachusetts: Beacon Press, 1994
- Wang, Youru (2017). Historical Dictionary of Chan Buddhism. Rowman & Littlefield. ISBN 978-1-5381-0552-8. Archived from the original on 14 January 2023.
- Wayman, Alex and Hideko (1990), The Lion's roar of Queen Srimala, Delhi: Motilal Banarsidass Publishers
- Welter, Albert (2002), The Textual History of the Linji lu (Record of Linji): The Earliest Recorded Fragments, archived from the original on 11 April 2012
- Welter, Albert (2006), The Formation of the Linji lu: An Examination of the Guangdeng lu/Sijia yulu and Linji Huizhao Chanshi yulu. Versions of the Linji lu in Historical Context (PDF), archived from the original (PDF) on 16 March 2013
- Welter, Albert. "Mahakasyapa's smile. Silent Transmission and the Kung-an (Koan) Tradition". In Heine & Wright (2000).
- Wolfe, Robert (2009), Living Nonduality: Enlightenment Teachings of Self-Realization, Karina Library
- Wright, Dale S. (2010), "Humanizing the Image of a Zen master: Taizan Maezumi Roshi", in Steven Heine and Dale S. Wright (ed.), Zen Masters, Oxford: Oxford University Press
- Yampolski, Philip (1967), The Platform Sutra of the Sixth Patriarch. Translated with notes by Philip B. Yampolsky, Columbia University Press, ISBN 0-231-08361-0
- Yampolski, Philip (2003a), "Chan. A Historical Sketch.", in Takeuchi Yoshinori (ed.), Buddhist Spirituality. Indian, Southeast Asian, Tibetan, Early Chinese, Delhi: Motilal Banarsidass
- Yampolski, Philip (2003b), "Zen. A Historical Sketch", in Takeuchi Yoshinori (ed.), Buddhist Spirituality. Indian, Southeast Asian, Tibetan, Early Chinese, Delhi: Motilal Banarsidass
- Yanagida, Seizan (2009), Historical Introduction to The Record of Linji. In: The record of Linji, translated by Ruth Fuller Sasakia e.a. Pages 59–115 (PDF), University of Hawaii Press, archived from the original (PDF) on 22 June 2012
- Yen, Chan Master Sheng (1996), Dharma Drum: The Life and Heart of Ch'an Practice, Boston & London: Shambhala
- Yoshizawa, Katsuhiro (2009), The Religious Art of Zen Master Hakuin, Counterpoint Press
- Young, Stuart (2009), Linji Lu and Chinese Orthodoxy. Review of "Albert Welter. The Linji lu and the Creation of Chan Orthodoxy: The Development of Chan's Records of Sayings Literature., archived from the original on 10 May 2013
- Zhang, Shengyen; Stevenson, Dan (2002), Hoofprint of the Ox: Principles of the Chan Buddhist Path as Taught by a Modern Chinese Master, Oxford University Press
