= Ōtōkan =

Lineage of the Rinzai school of Zen (a form of Japanese Buddhism)

The Ōtōkan lineage (応灯関、應燈關) is a lineage of the Rinzai school of Zen (a form of Japanese Buddhism). It was founded by Nanpo Shōmyō (1235–1308), who received dharma-transmission in China in 1265 from Xutang Zhiyu.

It is centered at the temple complexes of Myōshin-ji (founded by Kanzan Egen (1277–1360), the third patriarch) and Daitoku-ji (founded by Daito Kokushi (Shuho Myocho) (1283–1338), the second patriarch) in Kyoto, and sometimes referred to as the "Myōshin-ji lineage" accordingly. It now consists of two main lines, the Inzan line and the Takujū line, which date to circa 1800.

== History ==
The name Ōtōkan, traditionally written 應燈關, in modern Japanese written 応灯関, is a compound of ō-tō-kan, and is derived from the names of the first three patriarchs:

- the "ō" of Daiō Kokushi 大應國師 (Nanpo Jōmyō (南浦紹明?) (1235–1308)
- the "tō" of Daitō Kokushi 大燈國師 (Shuho Myocho) (1283–1338)
- and the "kan" of Kanzan Egen 關山慧玄 (1277–1360)

The Otokan lineage was founded by Nanpo Shōmyō, who received transmission in China from the monk Xutang Zhiyu 虚堂智愚 (Japanese Kido Chigu, 1185–1269) in 1265, and returned to Japan in 1267. It was then spread by his student Shuho Myocho (second generation) and Kanzan Egen (third generation), who made it an influential school.

It is today the only surviving lineage in the Rinzai school, and is historically the most influential. It is the lineage to which Hakuin Ekaku belonged, from whom all contemporary Rinzai lineages descend. It is also the lineage of the Ōbaku sect, which is closely related to Rinzai. Other Rinzai lineages previously existed, but no others survived the 19th century.

== Lineage ==
The lineage is as follows. Direct inheritance is given, with side branches (that have since died out) generally not given.

This lists the lineage from Nanpo Shōmyō (first Japanese) through Hakuin Ekaku (fountainhead of all extant Rinzai lineages) and his immediate disciples, branching with Inzan Ien and Takujū Kosen. Note that Shoju Rojin did not grant Hakuin Ekaku permission to teach, but today Hakuin is considered to have received dharma transmission from Shoju, since Hakuin himself regarded Shoju Rojin's influence in his understanding of Zen.

1. Nanpo Shōmyō 南浦紹明 (1235–1308), posthumous name Enzu Daiō Kokushi 圓通大應國師, usually simply Daiō Kokushi 大應國師
2. Shūhō Myōchō 宗峰妙超 (1282–1337), usually known as Daitō Kokushi 大燈國師, founded Daitoku-ji
  Tettō Gikō (1295–1369)
  Gongai Sōchū (1315–1390)
3. Kanzan Egen 關山慧玄 (1277–1360), founder of Myōshin-ji
4. Juō Sōhitsu (1296–1380)
5. Muin Sōin (1326–1410)
6. Tozen Soshin (Sekko Soshin) (1408–1486)
7. Toyo Eicho (1429–1504)
8. Taiga Tankyo (?–1518)
9. Koho Genkun (?–1524)
10. Sensho Zuisho (?–?)
11. Ian Chisatsu (1514–1587)
12. Tozen Soshin (1532–1602)
13. Yozan Keiyō (?–?)
14. Gudō Toshoku (1577–1661)
15. Shidō Bu'nan (1603–1676)
16. Shoju Rojin (Shoju Ronin, Dokyu Etan, 1642–1721)
17. Hakuin Ekaku 白隠慧鶴 (1686–1769), very influential revivalist
18. Gasan Jitō 峨山慈棹 (1727–1797)

At this point the lineage splits in two:

- Inzan Ien 隱山惟琰 (1751–1814)
- Takujū Kosen 卓洲胡僊 (1760–1833)

Further generations are extensive, including all current Rinzai masters; some examples are listed below.

Takujū:

1. Ryochu Nyoryu 良忠如隆 (1793–1868), abbot of Manpuku-ji

== Schools ==
The two main schools today are Takujū and Inzan. These have a few differences in practice:

- Takujū works through the three major works of Mumonkan, Kattō-shū, and Hekiganroku in that order, while Inzan mix the works, but still in a prescribed order.
- Takujū uses jakugo (capping phrase) for all kōans, while Inzan uses it for most, but not all

== Sources ==
- Dumoulin, Heinrich (2005), Zen Buddhism: A History. Volume 2: Japan, World Wisdom Books, ISBN 9780941532907
- Mohr, Michel (2003), Hakuin. In: Buddhist Spirituality. Later China, Korea, Japan and the Modern World; edited by Takeuchi Yoshinori, Delhi: Motilal Banarsidass
