= Doctrinal background of Zen =

Zen has a rich doctrinal background, despite the traditional Zen narrative which states that it is a "special transmission outside scriptures" which "did not stand upon words."

== Polarities ==
Classical Chinese Chan has become characterised by a set of polarities: absolute-relative, Buddha-nature - sunyata, sudden and gradual enlightenment, esoteric and exoteric transmission.

=== Absolute-relative ===
The Prajnaparamita-sutras and Madhyamaka emphasized the non-duality of form and emptiness: "form is emptiness, emptiness is form", as the Heart Sutra says. This was understood to mean that ultimate reality is not a transcendental realm, but equal to the daily world of relative reality. This idea fitted into the Chinese culture, which emphasized the mundane world and society. But this does not tell how the absolute is present in the relative world:

To deny the duality of samsara and nirvana, as the Perfection of Wisdom does, or to demonstrate logically the error of dichotomizing conceptualization, as Nagarjuna does, is not to address the question of the relationship between samsara and nirvana -or, in more philosophical terms, between phenomenal and ultimate reality [...] What, then, is the relationship between these two realms?

This question is answered in such schemata as the Five Ranks of Dongshan, the Oxherding Pictures, and Hakuin's Four ways of knowing.

The Madhyamaka-scheme of the Two Truths doctrine, and the Yogacara-schemes of the Three Natures and the Trikaya-doctrine, also give depictions of the interplay between the absolute and the relative.

=== Buddha-nature and sunyata ===
When Buddhism was introduced in China it was understood in terms of its own culture. Various sects struggled to attain an understanding of the Indian texts. The Tathāgatagarbha Sutras and the idea of the Buddha-nature were endorsed, because of the perceived similarities with the Tao, which was understood as a transcendental reality underlying the world of appearances. Sunyata at first was understood as pointing to the Taoist "wu", nothingness.

The doctrine of the Buddha-nature asserts that all sentient beings have Buddha-nature (Skt. Buddhadhātu, "Buddha Element", "Buddha-Principle"), the element from which awakening springs. The Tathāgatagarbha Sutras (literally: the womb of the thus-gone) state that every living being has the potential to realize awakening. Hence Buddhism offers salvation to every-one, not only to monks or those who have freed themselves almost completely from karma in previous lives. The Yogacara theory of the Eight Consciousnesses explains how sensory input and the mind create the world we experience, and obscure the alaya-vijnana, which is equated to the Buddha-nature.

When this potential is realized, and the defilements have been eliminated, the tathagatagarbha manifests as the Dharmakaya, the absolute reality which pervades everything in the world. In this way, it is also the primordial reality from which phenomenal reality springs. When this understanding is idealized, it becomes a transcendental reality beneath the world of appearances.

Sunyata points to the "emptiness" or no-"thing"-ness of all "things". Though we perceive a world of concrete and discrete objects, designated by names, on close analysis the "thingness" dissolves, leaving them "empty" of inherent existence. The Heart sutra, a text from the prajnaparamita-sutras, articulates this in the following saying in which the five skandhas are said to be "empty":

"Oh, Sariputra, Form Does not Differ From the Void,

And the Void Does Not Differ From Form.
Form is Void and Void is Form;
The Same is True For Feelings,

Perceptions, Volitions and Consciousness". (Note: The Heart Sutra Prajna Paramita Hrydaya Sutra)

The teachings on the five skandhas belong to the central teachings in the Tripitaka. They form a subdivision of the Samyutta Nikaya. The five skandhas are also mentioned in the Lankavatara-sutra:

The Citta dances like a dancer; the Manas resembles a jester; the [Mano-]vijnana together with the five [Vijnanas] creates an objective world which is like a stage. (Note: Lankavatara Sutra, chapter LXXXII, p.192 Suzuki-translation, p.223/224 in brackets) (Note: The influence of these teachings can be seen in the sayings of Mazu: Master Liang visited Ma-tsu. Ma-tsu said: I heard that the master is great at explaining the sutras and sastras, is that so? Liang said: Indeed Ma-tsu said: With what do you explain? Liang said: I explain with the mind Ma-tsu said: The mind is like an artist and consciousness is [like] his helper, how can you explain the teachings with that?)

The Yogacara explains this "emptiness" in an analysis of the way we perceive "things". Everything we conceive of is the result of the working of the five skandhas—results of perception, feeling, volition, and discrimination. (Note: Translations do differ, which makes a difference. Vijñāna can be translated as "consciousness", but also as "discernment".) The five skandhas together compose consciousness. The "things" we are conscious of are "mere concepts", not Ding an sich.

It took Chinese Buddhism several centuries to recognize that sunyata does not refer to "wu", nothingness, nor does Buddhism postulate an undying soul. The influence of those various doctrinal and textual backgrounds is still discernible in Zen. Zen teachers still refer to Buddha-nature, but the Zen tradition also emphasizes that Buddha-nature is sunyata, the absence of an independent and substantial self.

=== Sudden and gradual enlightenment ===
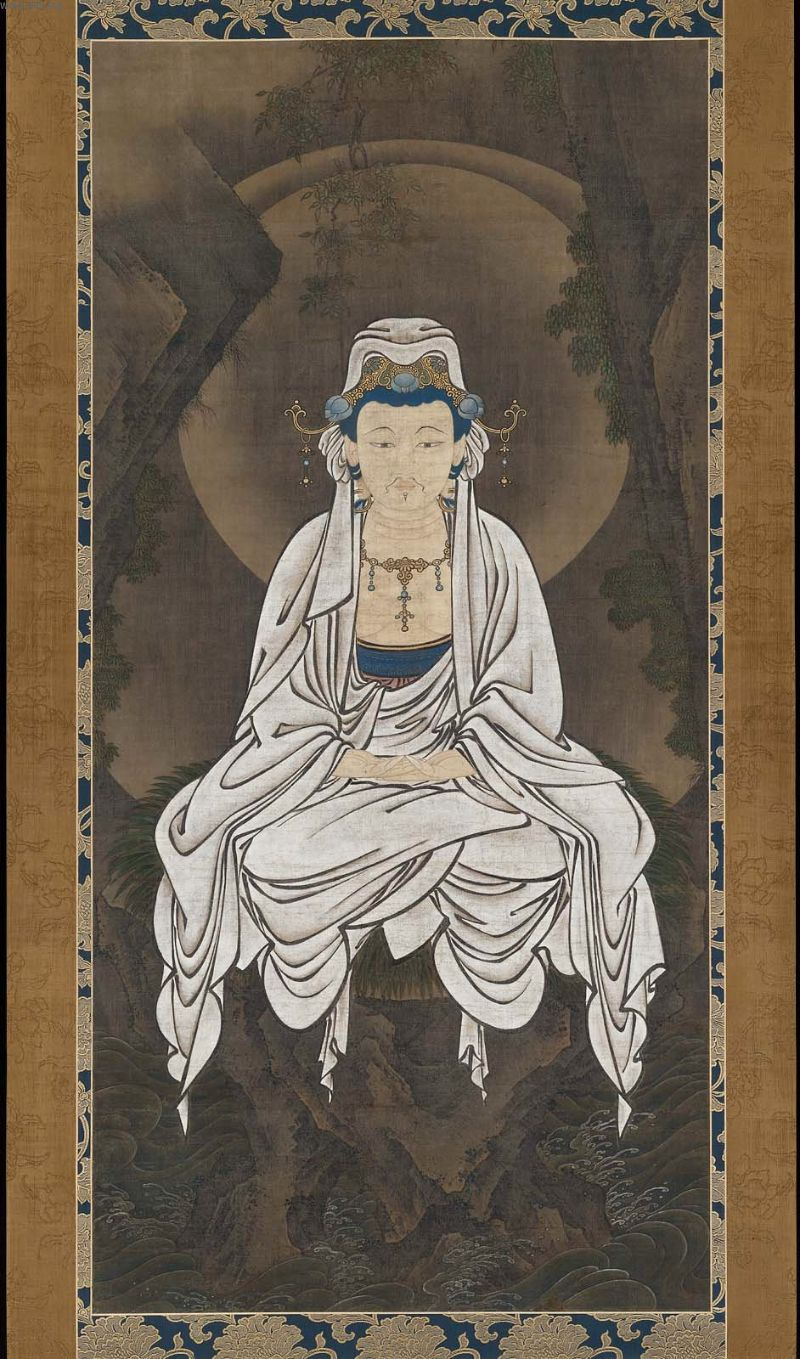
Kannon (Avalokiteśvara) Bodhisattva sitting in meditation

In Zen Buddhism two main views on the way to enlightenment are discernible, namely sudden and gradual enlightenment.

Early Chan recognized the "transcendence of the body and mind", followed by "non-defilement [of] knowledge and perception", meaning sudden insight into the true nature followed by gradual purification of intentions.

In the 8th century the Chan-history was effectively re-fashioned by Shenhui, who created a dichotomy between the so-called "Northern School", led by Yuquan Shenxiu, and his own line of teaching, which he called the "Southern school". Shenhui placed Huineng into prominence as the sixth Chan-patriarch, and emphasized sudden enlightenment, as opposed to the concurrent Northern School's alleged gradual enlightenment. According to the sudden enlightenment propagated by Shenhui insight into true nature is sudden; thereafter there can be no misunderstanding anymore about this true nature.

In the Platform Sutra the dichotomy between sudden and gradual is reconciled. Guifeng Zongmi, fifth-generation successor to Shenhui, also softened the edge between sudden and gradual. In his analysis, sudden awakening points to seeing into one's true nature, but is to be followed by a gradual cultivation to attain Buddhahood.

Chinul, a 12th-century Korean Seon master, followed Zongmi, and also emphasized that insight into our true nature is sudden, but is to be followed by practice to ripen the insight and attain full Buddhahood. This is also the standpoint of the contemporary Sanbo Kyodan, according to whom kensho is at the start of the path to full enlightenment.

This gradual cultivation is also recognized by Dongshan, who described the Five ranks of enlightenment. (Note: The Five Ranks of Tozan) Other example of depiction of stages on the path are the Ten Ox-Herding Pictures which detail the steps on the Path, the Three Mysterious Gates of Linji, and the Four Ways of Knowing of Hakuin. This gradual cultivation is described by Chan Master Sheng Yen as follows:

Ch'an expressions refer to enlightenment as "seeing your self-nature". But even this is not enough. After seeing your self-nature, you need to deepen your experience even further and bring it into maturation. You should have enlightenment experience again and again and support them with continuous practice. Even though Ch'an says that at the time of enlightenment, your outlook is the same as of the Buddha, you are not yet a full Buddha.

The emphasis which Shenhui placed on sudden enlightenment, also reflected a growing appreciation of the Diamond Sutra in 8th-century Chinese Buddhism. The Lankavatara-sutra, which endorses the Buddha-nature, emphasized purity of mind, which can be attained in gradations. The Diamond-sutra emphasizes sunyata, which "must be realized totally or not at all".

Once the dichotomy between sudden and gradual was in place, it defined its own logic and rhetorics, which are also recognizable in the distinction between Caodong (Soto) and Lin-ji (Rinzai) Chan. But it also leads to a "sometimes bitter and always prolix sectarian controversy between later Chan and Hua-yen exegetes". In the Huayan classification of teachings, the sudden approach was regarded inferior to the Perfect Teaching of Hua-yen. Guifeng Zongmi, fifth patriarch of Hua-yen ànd Chan-master, devised his own classification to counter this subordination. To establish the superiority of the Chan-teachings, Chinul explained the sudden approach as not pointing to mere emptiness, but to suchness or the dharmadhatu.

=== Esoteric and exoteric transmission ===
According to Borup the emphasis on 'mind to mind transmission' is a form of esoteric transmission, in which "the tradition and the enlightened mind is transmitted face to face". Metaphorically this can be described as the transmission from a flame from one candle to another candle, or the transmission from one vein to another. In exoteric transmission requires "direct access to the teaching through a personal discovery of one's self. This type of transmission and identification is symbolized by the discovery of a shining lantern, or a mirror."

This polarity is recognizable in the emphasis that the Zen-tradition puts on maintaining the correct Dharma transmission, while simultaneously stressing seeing into one's nature. According to Rinzai master Tōrei Enji:

The matter of learning from a teacher is most essential. People of old who arrived at the source of seeing nature, passed through many barriers clearly and completely without a dot of doubt, and traveled freely through the world opening big mouths in discussion, only came to know the transcendental message of Zen after they finally ran into Zen masters of great vision. Then they sincerely sought certainty and wound up with the duty of the teacher's succession, bearing the debt of Dharma, never to forget it for a moment. This is called dharma succession. Since ancient times the designated succession of the ancestral teachers has always been like this. (Note: The modern framing of Zen as the experience of 'ultimate truth' or reality may influence the institutional shape western Zen is going to take, where individual freedom is highly appraised. See also Bodiford 2008, pp 277-279)

Nevertheless, while the Zen tradition has always stressed the importance of formal Dharma transmission, there are well known examples of Mushi dokugo, such as Nōnin, Jinul and Suzuki Shōsan who attained awakening on their own, though all of them were familiair with the Zen-teachings.

== The Bodhisattva ideal ==
An important, though easily overlooked aspect of Zen is the bodhisattva ideal. It supplements kensho and insight into the absolute with Karuṇā, compassion with all sentient beings. This ideal is reflected in the Bodhisattva vow and the Bodhisattva Precepts or jukai. (Note: Dogen, On Receiving the Precepts)

Part of this Bodhisattva-ideal are the pāramitās, which are also being mentioned in the Diamond Sutra:

- Dāna (generosity, giving of oneself),
- Śīla (virtue, morality, proper conduct),
- Kṣānti (patience, tolerance, forbearance, acceptance, endurance),
- Vīrya (energy, diligence, vigour, effort),
- Dhyāna (meditation, tranquility), and
- Prajñā (wisdom, insight). (Note: Wai-tao and Goddard re-arranged their translation of the Diamond Sutra topically, using the six paramitas as a framework)

The Bodhisattva-ideal is a central theme in the prajnaparamita-sutras.

Dogen mentions the Bodhisattva-ideal throughout his works. (Note: Dogen, Sobogenzo, On Kannon, the Bodhisattva of Compassion) (Note: dogen, Shobogenzo, On the Four Exemplary Acts of a Bodhisattva)

Hakuin saw "deep compassion and commitment to help all sentient beings everywhere" as an indispensable part of the Buddhist path to awakening. Hakuin emphasized the need of "post-satori training", purifying the mind of karmic tendencies and

[W]hipping forward the wheel of the Four Universal Vows, pledging yourself to benefit and save all sentient beings while striving every minute of your life to practice the great Dharma giving.

The insight in the need of arousing bodhicitta formed Hakuin's final awakening:

Wasn't a shaven head and monk's robe the Mind of Enlightenment? Wasn't reciting sutras, mantras, and dharanis the Mind of Enlightenment? [...] [At] my forty-first year, [...] I at long last penetrated into the heart of this great matter. Suddenly, unexpectedly, I saw it — it was as clear as if it were right there in the hollow of my hand. What is the Mind of Enlightenment? It is, I realized, a matter of doing good — benefiting others by giving them the gift of the Dharma teaching.

Buddhas and bodhisattvas such as Amitābha, Avalokiteśvara, Mañjuśrī, Samantabhadra, and Kṣitigarbha are venerated alongside Gautama Buddha. (Note: mentions: Blofeld, John (1988), Bodhisattva of compassion - the mystical tradition of kuan Yin. Boston: Shanbhala)

By repeatedly chanting the Avalokiteshvara sutra (観世音菩薩普門品, Kanzeon Bosatsu Fumonbon) (chapter 25 of the Lotus Sutra (Note: Avalokiteśvara Sutra)), for example, one instills the Bodhisattva's ideals into one's mind. The ultimate goal is given in the end of the sutra, which states, "In the morning, be one with Avalokiteshvara; in the evening, be one with Avalokiteshvara". Through the realization of emptiness and the Mahayana notion that all things have Buddha-nature, one understands that there is no difference between the cosmic bodhisattva and oneself. The wisdom and compassion of the Bodhisattva one is chanting to is seen to equal the inner wisdom and compassion of the practitioner. Thus, the duality between subject and object, practitioner and Bodhisattva, chanter and sutra is ended.

== See also ==
- Buddhism
- Outline of Buddhism
- Timeline of Buddhism
- List of Buddhists
- Chinese Buddhism
- Japanese Zen

== Sources ==
- Aitken, Robert (1994), Foreword to "A Buddhist Bible", Boston, Massachusetts: Beacon Press
- Anderson, Reb (2000), Being Upright: Zen Meditation and the Bodhisattva Precepts, Rodmell Press
- Batchelor, Martine (2004), The Path Of Compassion: The Bodhisattva Precepts, Rowman Altamira
- Blyth, R. H. (1966), Zen and Zen Classics, Volume 4, Tokyo: Hokuseido Press
- Borup, Jørn (2008), Japanese Rinzai Zen Buddhism: Myōshinji, a Living Religion, Brill
- Brown Holt, Linda (1995), "From India to China: Transformations in Buddhist Philosophy", Qi: The Journal of Traditional Eastern Health & Fitness
- Buswell, Robert E. (1991), The "Short-cut" Approach of K'an-hua Meditation: The Evolution of a Practical Subitism in Chinese Ch'an Buddhism. In: Peter N. Gregory (editor) (1991), Sudden and Gradual. Approaches to Enlightenment in Chinese Thought, Delhi: Motilal Banarsidass Publishers Private Limited
- Buswell, Robert E (1993), Ch'an Hermeneutics: A Korean View. In: Donald S. Lopez, Jr. (ed.)(1993), Buddhist Hermeneutics, Delhi: Motilal Banarsidass
- Chang, Chung-Yuan (1967). "Ch'an Buddhism: Logical and Illogical". Philosophy East and West. 17 (1/4): 37–49. doi:10.2307/1397043. JSTOR 1397043. Archived from the original on 2011-05-24.
- Cleary, Thomas (2005), Classics of Buddhism and Zen: Volume One, Boston, MA: Shambhala publications, ISBN 1-57062-831-9
- Dumoulin, Heinrich (2005a), Zen Buddhism: A History. Volume 1: India and China, World Wisdom Books, ISBN 978-0-941532-89-1
- Faure, Bernard (1997), The Will to Orthodoxy: A Critical Genealogy of Northern Chan Buddhism, Stanford University Press
- Faure, Bernard (2000), Visions of Power. Imaging Medieval Japanese Buddhism, Princeton, New Jersey: Princeton University Press
- Ferguson, Andy (2000), Zen's Chinese Heritage, Boston, MA: Wisdom Publications, ISBN 0-86171-163-7
- Fowler, Merv (2005), Zen Buddhism: Beliefs and Practices, Sussex Academic Press
- Gimello, Robert M. (1994), Marga and Culture: Learning, Letters, and Liberation in Northern Sung Ch'an. In: Buswell & Gimello (editors)(1994), Paths to Liberation. Pages 475-505, Delhi: Motilal Banarsidass Publishers
- Goddard, Dwight (2007), History of Ch'an Buddhism previous to the times of Hui-neng (Wie-lang). In: A Buddhist Bible, Forgotten Books, ISBN 978-1-60506-104-7
- Gregory, Peter N. (1991), Sudden Enlightenment Followed by Gradual Cultivation: Tsung-mi's Analysis of mind. In: Peter N. Gregory (editor)(1991), Sudden and Gradual. Approaches to Enlightenment in Chinese Thought, Delhi: Motilal Banarsidass Publishers Private Limited
- Gregory, Peter N. (2002), Tsung-mi and the Sinification of Buddhism, University of Hawaiʻi Press, Kuroda Institute, (originally published Princeton University Press, 1991, Princeton, N.J.), ISBN 0-8248-2623-X
- Grigg, Ray (1999), The Ta of Zen, Edison, NJ: Alva Press
- Hakuin, Ekaku (2010), Wild Ivy: The Spiritual Autobiography of Zen Master Hakuin, translated by Norman Waddell, Shambhala Publications, ISBN 978-1-57062-770-5
- Heine, Steven (2008), Zen Skin, Zen Marrow
- Isshū, Miura; Sasaki, Ruth F. (1993), The Zen Koan, New York: Harcourt Brace & Company, ISBN 0-15-699981-1
- Huaijin, Nan (1997), Basic Buddhism: exploring Buddhism and Zen, Samuel Weiser
- Kalupahana, David J. (1992), The Principles of Buddhist Psychology, Delhi: ri Satguru Publications
- Kalupahana, David J. (1994), A history of Buddhist philosophy, Delhi: Motilal Banarsidass Publishers Private Limited
- Kapleau, Philip (1989), The three pillars of Zen
- Kasulis, Thomas P. (2003), Ch'an Spirituality. In: Buddhist Spirituality. Later China, Korea, Japan and the Modern World; edited by Takeuchi Yoshinori, Delhi: Motilal Banarsidass
- Lai, Whalen (2003), Buddhism in China: A Historical Survey. In Antonio S. Cua (ed.): Encyclopedia of Chinese Philosophy (PDF), New York: Routledge, archived from the original (PDF) on November 12, 2014
- Lathouwers, Ton (2000), Meer dan een mens kan doen. Zentoespraken, Rotterdam: Asoka
- Leighton, Taigen Daniel (2000), Cultivating the Empty Field: The Silent Illumination of Zen Master Hongzhi, Tuttle Publishing, ISBN 978-0-8048-3240-3
- Lievens, Bavo (1981), Ma-tsu. De gesprekken, Bussum: Het Wereldvenster
- Liang-Chieh (1986), The Record of Tung-shan, Translated by William F. Powell, Kuroda Institute
- Low, Albert (2006), Hakuin on Kensho. The Four Ways of Knowing, Boston & London: Shambhala
- Maspero, Henri (1981), Taoism and Chinese Religion, University of Massachusetts Press, ISBN 0-87023-308-4
- McMahan, David L. (2008), The Making of Buddhist Modernism, Oxford University Press, ISBN 978-0-19-518327-6
- McRae, John (2003), Seeing Through Zen, The University Press Group Ltd
- Meng-Tat Chia, Jack (2011), "A Review of Enlightenment in Dispute: The Reinvention of Chan Buddhism in Seventeenth-Century China" (PDF), Journal of Buddhist Ethics, 18
- Oh, Kang-nam (2000), "The Taoist Influence on Hua-yen Buddhism: A Case of the Scinicization of Buddhism in China", Chung-Hwa Buddhist Journal, 13
- Sharf, Robert H. (2002), On Pure Land Buddhism and Ch'an/Pure Land Syncretism in Mediaeval China, Leiden, Netherlands: Brill
- Shimano, Eido T. (1991), Points of Departure: Zen Buddhism with a Rinzai View, Livingston Manor, NY: The Zen Studies Society Press, ISBN 0-9629246-0-1
- Suzuki, D.T. (1935), Manual of Zen Buddhism
- Suzuki, D.T. (1955), Studies in Zen, New York: Delta
- Suzuki, D.T. (1970), Zen and Japanese Culture, New York: Bollingen/Princeton University Press, ISBN 0-691-09849-2
- Suzuki, D.T. (2004), The Training of the Zen Buddhist Monk, Tokyo: Cosimo, inc., ISBN 1-59605-041-1
- Torei (2010), The Undying Lamp of Zen. The Testament of Zen Master Torei, Translated by Thomas Cleary, Boston & London: Shambhala
- Swanson, Paul L. (1993), "The Spirituality of Emptiness in Early Chinese Buddhism", in Takeuchi Yoshinori (ed.), Buddhist Spirituality. Indian, Southeast Asian, Tibetan, Early Chinese, New York: Crossroad
- Waddell, Norman (2010), Foreword to "Wild Ivy: The Spiritual Autobiography of Zen Master Hakuin", Shambhala Publications
- "The Diamond Sutra", A Buddhist Bible, translated by Wai-tao, Boston, Massachusetts: Beacon Press, 1994
- Wayman, Alex; Wayman, Hideko (1990). The Lion's Roar of Queen Śrīmālā: A Buddhist Scripture on the Tathāgatagarbha Theory. Motilal Banarsidass. ISBN 978-81-208-0731-0.
- Wegner, Michael (2001), Introduction to "Branching streams flow in the darkness: Zen talks on the Sandokai"by Shunryū Suzuki, University of California Press, ISBN 978-0-520-23212-9
- Welter, Albert, The Formation of the Linji lu: An Examination of the Guangdeng lu/Sijia yulu and Linji Huizhao Chanshi yulu. Versions of the Linji lu in Historical Context (PDF), archived from the original (PDF) on 2013-03-16
- Welter, Albert (2000), Mahakasyapa's smile. Silent Transmission and the Kung-an (Koan) Tradition. In: Steven Heine and Dale S. Wright (eds)(2000): "The Koan. Texts and Contexts in Zen Buddhism, Oxford: Oxford University Press
- Yampolski, Philip B. (1967), The Platform Sutra of the Sixth Patriarch. Translated with notes by Philip B. Yampolski, Columbia University Press, ISBN 0-231-08361-0
- Yampolski, Philip (2003a), Chan. A Historical Sketch. In: Buddhist Spirituality. Later China, Korea, Japan and the Modern World; edited by Takeuchi Yoshinori, Delhi: Motilal Banarsidass
- Yampolski, Philip (2003b), Zen. A Historical Sketch. In: Buddhist Spirituality. Later China, Korea, Japan and the Modern World; edited by Takeuchi Yoshinori, Delhi: Motilal Banarsidass
- Yen, Sheng (2006). Dharma Drum: The Life and Heart of Chan Practice. Boston & London: Shambhala. ISBN 978-1-59030-396-2.
- Young, Stuart (2009), Linji Lu and Chinese Orthodoxy. Review of "Albert Welter. The Linji lu and the Creation of Chan Orthodoxy: The Development of Chan's Records of Sayings Literature.
- Zvelebil, K.V. (1987), "The Sound of the One Hand", Journal of the American Oriental Society, 107 (1), doi:10.2307/602960, JSTOR 602960
