= Wasan (disambiguation) =

Wasan (和讃) is a type of Japanese Buddhist hymn.

Wasan may also refer to:

- Japanese mathematics (和算, wasan), a distinct kind of mathematics developed in Japan during the Edo period (1603–1867)
- Kampong Wasan, a village in Brunei
- Wasan Important Bird Area, Brunei

== See also ==
- Wassan
