= Wild fox koan =

Influential kōan story in the Zen tradition

The wild fox kōan, also known as "Pai-chang's fox" and "Hyakujō and a Fox", is an influential kōan story in the Zen tradition dating back as early as 1036, when it appeared in the Chinese biographical history T'ien-sheng kuang-teng lu. It was also in The Gateless Gate (Mandarin: 無門關 Wúménguān; Japanese: 無門関 Mumonkan), a 13th-century collection of 48 kōans compiled by the Chinese monk Wumen, as case two.

== Overview ==
The koan tells the story of a monk who, after denying that an enlightened person falls into cause and effect, was turned into a wild fox for five hundred lifetimes. He appears to Zen Master Baizhang (Wade-Giles: Pai-chang; Japanese: Hyakujō) and demands a "turning word," a phrase intended to prompt one to realization, to be freed from his animal form.

After Baizhang tells him not to ignore cause and effect, the monk confirms that he has been released from his wild fox body and asks to be given a monk's funeral rites. Later, when Baizhang's disciple Huangbo (Wade-Giles: Huang-po; Japanese: Ōbaku) asks what would have happened had the monk not denied cause and effect, Baizhang tells Huangbo to come close so he can answer him. Huangbo steps forward and slaps Baizhang, ostensibly in the awareness that Baizhang had intended to strike him. Baizhang laughs approvingly and compares Huangbo to the Indian monk and Zen patriarch Bodhidharma.

== The kōan ==
=== Main case ===
Tanahashi gives the following rendering of the koan:

Every time Baizhang, Zen Master Dahui, gave a dharma talk, a certain old man would come to listen. He usually left after the talk, but one day he remained. Baizhang asked, "Who is there?"

The man said, "I am not actually a human being. I lived and taught on this mountain at the time of Kashyapa Buddha. One day a student asked me, 'Does a person who practices with great devotion still fall into cause and effect?' I said to him, 'No, such a person doesn't.' Because I said this I was reborn as a wild fox for five hundred lifetimes. Reverend master, please say a turning word for me and free me from this wild fox body." Then he asked Baizhang, "Does a person who practices with great devotion still fall into cause and effect?"

Baizhang said, "Don't ignore cause and effect."

Immediately the man had great realization. Bowing, he said, "I am now liberated from the body of a wild fox. I will stay in the mountain behind the monastery. Master, could you perform the usual services for a deceased monk for me?"

Baizhang asked the head of the monks' hall to inform the assembly that funeral services for a monk would be held after the midday meal. The monks asked one another, "What's going on? Everyone is well; there is no one sick in the Nirvana Hall." After their meal, Baizhang led the assembly to a large rock behind the monastery and showed them a dead fox at the rock's base. Following the customary procedure, they cremated the body.

That evening during his lecture in the dharma hall Baizhang talked about what had happened that day. Huangbo asked him, "A teacher of old gave a wrong answer and became a wild fox for five hundred lifetimes. What if he hadn't given a wrong answer?"

Baizhang said, "Come closer and I will tell you." Huangbo went closer and slapped Baizhang's face. Laughing, Baizhang clapped his hands and said, "I thought it was only barbarians who had unusual beards. But you too have an unusual beard!" (Note: Baizhang's turning word is rendered differently in various translations, as "obscure," "ignore," and "evade.")

=== Wumen's commentary and poem ===
Shibayama gives the following translation of Wumen's commentary and verse:

"Not falling into causation." Why was he turned into a fox? "Not ignoring causation." Why was he released from the fox body? If you have an eye to see through this, then you will know that the former head of the monastery did enjoy his five hundred happy blessed lives as a fox.

Not falling, not ignoring:

Odd and even are on one die.
Not ignoring, not falling:

Hundreds and thousands of regrets!

== Interpretation ==
The meaning of the kōan has been the object of intense debate and scrutiny within Zen due to its complexity and multi-layered themes. It was rated by Zen Master Hakuin (1686–1769) as a nantō kōan, one that is "difficult to pass through" but has the ability to facilitate "postenlightenment cultivation" or "realization beyond realization" (shōtaichōyō). Important themes include causality (karma in Buddhism), the power of language, reincarnation, and the folklore elements involved in the insertion of the fox into the tale.

Traditionally, interpretations since the time of the Mumonkan have stressed the nonduality of the two understandings of causality expressed within the case. Dōgen, regarded by Sōtō adherents as the founder of their practice, recast the kōan in the later part of his life as an affirmation of the fundamental importance of acknowledging cause and effect. The significance of this debate goes to fundamental issues in Buddhist thought, especially the meaning of enlightenment with respect to cause and effect.

=== Dōgen's interpretation ===
Dōgen articulated a doctrine called Genjōkōan which stressed “full participation in and through all phenomena” as the kōan bears on the immediate here-and-now. In this way, the stereotypical account of Dōgen as wholly in opposition to the use of kōans is in error. Dōgen drew upon kōans as an arbiter of philosophical authority and credence to grant his own ideas, often rooted in practical considerations, authenticity and importance.

Dōgen's views on the wild-fox kōan underwent a transformation from the conventional interpretation to an embrace of causality, as can be seen in two writings contained in the Shōbōgenzō, a compilation of fascicles written between the years 1231 and 1253. In contrast to his appropriation of other significant kōans, Dōgen initially supported the conventional understanding of the wild-fox kōan and only later recanted his view. The "Daishugyō" fascicle, written in 1244 (less than a year after Dōgen left the capital Kyoto to build a monastery in Echizen), conforms to the conventional view of the nonduality of the two notions of causality:

Because causality necessarily means full cause (ennin) and complete effect (manga), there is no reason for a discussion concerning "falling into" or "not falling into," "obscuring" or "not obscuring" [causality]....Although "not obscuring causality" released the wild fox body in the current age of Buddha Sakyamuni, it may not have been effective in the age of Buddha Kasyapa.

This view, which is in accordance with Wumen's position, notes the contingency of causality and non-causality and the need to transcend a limited perspective of cause and effect. However, Dōgen turns against this interpretation later in his life and stakes out a position in opposition to the conventional reading.

The change in emphasis in the later part of Dōgen’s life came at a point when he had separated himself from secular politics and had determined the need to create a monastic ideal that would have appeal among lay people. This is a position endorsed by the Monastic View of Dōgen’s late career, which holds that by the late 1240s Dōgen had become "a genuinely innovative administrator and orchestrator of monastic ritualism" who crafted his teachings and rituals with a variety of audiences in mind, including lay people and monks. An important implication of the fact that Dōgen sought to cultivate a lay audience is that his emphasis on supernatural events at his monastery Eiheiji, which appears in his writings starting in the late 1240s and lasts until his death, was aimed at attracting lay followers. Dōgen's changing interpretation of the wild-fox kōan, which has clear supernatural themes, can be seen in this light.

Indeed, by 1248, when Dōgen returned to Eiheiji from his Kamakura trip (in the time of the Kamakura shogunate), during which he refused an offer to head a temple in the city, his newfound view on causality had formed. In a formal talk he gave to his monks immediately upon his arrival, Dōgen was explicit in endorsing the literal interpretation of the kōan that not ignoring causality was an imperative for Buddhists:

Some of you may think that crossing countless mountains and rivers to teach lay students is giving priority to lay people over monks. Others may wonder if I taught them dharma that has never been expounded and has never been heard. However, there is no dharma that has never been expounded and has never been heard. I just expounded this dharma to guide people: Those who practice wholesome actions rise and those who practice unwholesome actions fall. You practice cause and harvest the effect….Thus I try to clarify, speak, identify with, and practice this teaching of cause and effect. Do you all understand it?

Dōgen acknowledges the perception among the Eiheiji monks that there has been a shift in his emphasis, though he seems to deny that there has been a substantive change. He also roots his teaching in tradition with the statement “there is no dharma that has never been expounded,” suggesting that he is drawing upon precedent and clarifying that his new teaching is meant only “to guide people.” Dōgen thus justifies the new teaching to his monks as a historically grounded and practical doctrine, although he recognizes the suddenness which he has introduced his ideas, apologizing to the assembly for “speak[ing] of cause and effect with no reason” and finishing his talk with a nostalgic poem.

Dōgen revisits the wild-fox kōan in “Jinshin inga,” a 1250s rewriting of the earlier “Daishugyō” fascicle, to ground his ideas in precedent and explain them in detail. He elaborates upon the significance of cause and effect, setting the stage for criticism of other thinkers and schools of thought. By suggesting that there is a distinction between existing in causality and a state in which causality is no longer in force, Dōgen's newfound view runs, conventional interpretations thus fall victim to "a dualistic contrast between the pure and impure, flux and serenity, and freedom from and subjection to causation." He explains:

Those who say "one does not fall into cause and effect" deny causation, thereby falling into the lower realms. Those who say "one cannot ignore cause and effect" clearly identify with cause and effect. When people hear about identifying with cause and effect, they are freed from the lower realms. Do not doubt this. Many of our contemporaries who consider themselves students of Zen deny causation. How do we know? They confuse "not ignoring" with "not falling into." Thus we know they deny cause and effect.

This is a clear repudiation of the earlier interpretation of the wild-fox kōan, specifically identifying it as illegitimate and inauthentic. In so doing, Dōgen clarifies his own position and distinguishes himself from interpretations of the kōan that stress the philosophical content of the story over the supernatural, folklore elements. Dōgen is especially clear to distinguish himself in opposition to the prevailing understanding of causality as he sees it in China, who allege that the monk had achieved "a limited view of enlightenment" due to his ability to remember past lives. Dōgen takes this opportunity to reaffirm the all-encompassing power of cause and effect and the existence of the supernatural, as the fox in the kōan demonstrates. He notes that those who claim the monk "did not become a fox because of past actions" are wrong: while some foxes are born with the ability to remember their past lives, "such a capacity may be the result of unwholesome action and not necessarily a seed of enlightenment." In other words, Dōgen confirms the deeply embedded Asian folklore stereotype that “there is something occultly nasty about an oriental fox," as Robert Aitken notes.

In contrast to Wumen’s commentary that the monk “did enjoy his five hundred blessed lives as a fox,” Dōgen argues that the fox transformation quite simply represents the undesirable result of the monk’s actions and thus demonstrates the power of karmic causality. He also speculates about the fate of the monk and which realm he is reincarnated into, noting that "free from a wild fox’s body, it must be either the realm of devas or humans." In his literal interpretation of the kōan, Dōgen accepts without doubt the supernatural elements in the story: the transformation into a wild fox, the monk’s subsequent ability to assume the form of a man when speaking to Baizhang, and his pledge to exist in the mountain. Having established the link between his embrace of causality and his cultivation of a lay people audience, Dōgen allows for the plausibility of supernatural occurrences within his doctrine of karmic causality.

=== Wumen's verse ===
Not falling, not ignoring:

Odd and even are on one die.
Not ignoring, not falling:

Hundreds and thousands of regrets!

Steven Heine notes that such a reading,

...emphasizes the relativity and ultimate inseparability of the conflicting views of causality (or not obscuring cause-and-effect) and noncausality (or not falling into cause-and-effect).

Either notion, in other words, can lead to liberation or to the perpetuation of suffering. Wumen's poem suggests that neither view of causality has an absolute monopoly on the truth. This view was quickly taken up by dozens of other commentaries and became the mainstream interpretation, creating a tradition in various schools of understanding the kōan in this way.

An alternative translation of Wumen's Ode:

Not falling, not darkening:

Two colors, one game.
Not darkening, not falling:

One thousand mistakes, ten thousand mistakes.

"Two colors, one game" refers literally to the "die" used in the Chinese game that had colors instead of numbered dots as in the die known to Europeans. The image refers to the Zen view that there is an underlying oneness to the two colors of falling or not falling into cause and effect. As Hakuin wrote in his Ode To Sitting Meditation (坐禅和讃, Zazen Wasan) when one turns the light around and awakens to one's self-nature, "then opens the gate of the oneness of cause and effect" (因果一如の門ひらけ, Inga ichi nyo no mon hirake).

The point of the koan is that for the ordinary person the two conflicting views of causality are between falling into cause and effect or not falling into cause and effect, because they dream of being free from cause and effect as being separate from cause and effect. But when a person awakens to their true nature he/she sees the oneness of cause and effect and therefore that person does not "darken", "obscure", or "ignore" (昧, mei4) the functioning of cause and effect by imagining cause and effect are two separate things, that cause and effect is separate from one's Buddha nature. Thus awakened persons neither "fall into" nor do they "not fall into" cause and effect, because they are one with cause and effect. And because they are one with cause and effect, they do not darken or ignore cause and effect.

Yet another and very different translation to the above two takes things more literally:

Controlled or not controlled?

The same die shows two faces.
Not controlled or controlled,

Both are a grievous error.

== Sources ==
- Heine, Steven (1999), Shifting Shape, Shaping Text: Philosophy and Folklore in the Fox Kōan, Honolulu: University of Hawai'i Press
- Shibayama (1974), Zen Comments on the Mumonkan, translated by Sumiko Kodo, New York: Harper & Row Publishers
- Tanahashi, Kazuaki, ed. (1999), Enlightenment Unfolds: The Essential Teachings of Zen Master Dōgen, Boston: Shambhala Publications
