= Bankei Yōtaku =

Japanese Rinzai Zen master

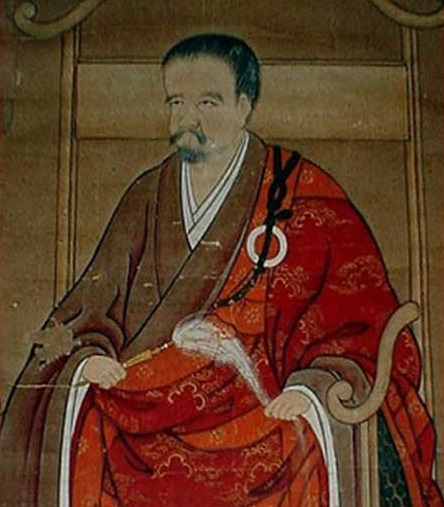
- Title: Zen master

Personal life
- Born: 1622 Harima Province, Japan
- Died: 1693 (aged 70–71)

Religious life
- Religion: Buddhism
- School: Rinzai

Senior posting
- Teacher: Umpo Zenjo
- Predecessor: Dosha Chogen

Bankei Yōtaku (盤珪永琢; 1622-1693) was a Japanese Rinzai Zen master, and the abbot of the Ryōmon-ji and Nyohō-ji. He was a major Zen figure of the Edo period and is best known for his emphasis on a minimalist sudden approach to Zen which simply relies on the unborn Buddha mind. He became well known in Japan for his public talks in colloquial Japanese which were popular among laypersons.

== Biography ==
=== Early years ===
Bankei Yōtaku was born in 1622, in Harima Province to a samurai turned medicine man named Suga Dosetsu. His boyhood name was Muchi. Bankei's mother bore the last name of Noguchi, and little more is known of her, other than that the society of the time extolled her as 'Maya who begot three Buddhas,' - Maya being the mother of the historical Buddha, Shakyamuni. Bankei had four brothers and four sisters. His eldest brother, Masayasu, was a skilled physician and his second eldest brother was a practitioner of the Pure Land school of Buddhism. Hence Bankei's mother was likened to Maya, Masayasu to Yakushi - the Buddha of healing, his second eldest brother to the Buddha Amida, and Bankei himself to Shakyamuni Buddha. Bankei was a rebellious and mischievous child, though he showed remarkable intelligence. When Bankei was 11, his father died, and in the following year he entered school.

=== Start of search ===
Here he was taught many of the Confucian texts. At this time, Bankei was young and full of questions and the Confucian classics he was being taught confused him greatly. One day, the teacher read the first line from 'Great Learning': "The way of great learning lies in clarifying bright virtue." Bankei entered a heated exchange with his teacher imploring them for the meaning of this. Bankei felt no satisfactory answers were given.

This gap in Bankei's understanding gave birth to many doubts and questions, and so he seized most every chance to question others on their knowledge. He would implore Confucian and Buddhist scholars and attend various religious gatherings in search of answers. All of this, however, proved futile for him. He became so distraught in his need to find answers that school was no longer a priority for him, and in 1633 he was kicked out of his family home. A family friend, Yūkan Nakahori, allowed Bankei to stay in a hut nearby. Being a bit eccentric, Bankei etched into a slat of wood "Practice hermitage" and placed it outside of his little hut.

=== Buddhist training ===
It is likely that Bankei began practicing Shin Buddhism during this time. It is known that when Bankei was 15 he trained at a Shingon temple, where he apparently gained some footing in sutra study. However, Bankei was not satisfied with the Shingon approach and left that following year. At 16 he walked from Hamada to Ako to see a Rinzai Zen priest named Umpo Zenjo at Zuiō-ji. Bankei wasted no time with Umpo and implored him on the meaning of bright virtue, to which Umpo advised the only path toward such understanding could be had through the practice of zazen. Bankei was intrigued by this advice and ordained as a monk at Zuiō-ji under Umpo. It was here he received his Buddhist name Yōtaku (meaning 'Long Polishing of the Mind Gem').

When Bankei turned 19 he left Zuiō-ji shortly after and travelled through Kyoto, Osaka and Kyūshū in search for an answer to his question. During his travels he would stay over at temples or sleep in the open wilderness, scrounging by as a beggar. In 1645, at age 24, Bankei returned to Zuiō-ji no wiser than the day he left. At this time Umpo informs him that the answer which he seeks can only be found within, not through an intermediary. Bankei left shortly after his return and built a hut nearby and lived as a hermit. He would sit for hours practicing zazen. He had given up bodily comfort and had no other goal during this time aside from coming to a complete understanding of things. He practiced this way for many years, but eventually the bodily neglect caused him to contract tuberculosis. He sought the counsel of a doctor who gave the prognosis of death.

=== Realizing the Unborn ===
It was during this near-death experience that Bankei realized the Unborn, later stating of the experience:

I felt a strange sensation in my throat. I spat against a wall. A mass of black phlegm large as a soapberry rolled down the side...Suddenly, just at that moment...I realized what it was that had escaped me until now: All things are perfectly resolved in the unborn.

Following this breakthrough his doubt and questioning ceased while his physical condition ameliorated. Once strong enough, he travelled back to Umpo to relay his experience. Umpo confirmed his enlightenment, and sent him off to have his understanding further evidenced by Gudō Toshoku, another Rinzai master.

=== Confirmation and awakening ===
At the age of 26 Bankei went to Gifu Prefecture to Daisen-ji where Gudo was abbot. However, when he arrived Gudo was attending to another temple of his in the countryside. So Bankei visited the temples of other Zen teachers in the area, none of which had priests with the proper understanding themselves to confirm his understanding. After a year living in the countryside near Daisen-ji, again Bankei travelled back to Umpo. In 1651, Bankei heard that a Ch'an master had arrived in Nagasaki by the name of Dosha Chogen. Umpo advised he go see the Ch'an master, and Bankei set off for Kōfuku-ji, where the monk was currently staying, hoping to finally have his enlightenment confirmed. On their first meeting, Dosha confirmed Bankei's understanding but also informed him that it was incomplete. Bankei was offended by this initially and refused to accept it. Eventually he chose to stay at the temple to observe Dosha's ways, impressed by the master.

While Bankei lived among the other monks at the temple, he refused to chant the sutras with them in Chinese. In 1652, while meditating with the congregation, Bankei experienced final awakening. Dosha confirmed this the next day, stating Bankei had finally settled the Great Matter. Before long, Dosha decided to certify Bankei's enlightenment, but as Dosha began to write out his certification document, Bankei took it from his hands and ripped it up. Bankei had no need for documentation of his enlightenment. Later in his life, Bankei would say that he felt Dosha had not fully matured in his awakening.

Bankei also refused a senior position at Kōfuku-ji, preferring his unassuming existence instead working in the kitchen. The following year Bankei returned to Harima for a short while, and then left for Yoshino in the Nara Prefecture to live again as a hermit. In the mountains of Yoshino, Bankei authored some Buddhist chants pertaining to the Unborn while living there in silent retreat. He also gave public talks to peasants and laypersons on the Unborn.

=== Later travels and activities ===
Later in his life he traveled constantly to a variety of places. He stayed various times at Myōshin-ji and even acted as abbot for a brief time in 1672.

From his late fifties until the end of his life, Bankei held large retreats in which vast throngs of people came from all over to hear his lectures on the Unborn. In attendance would be monks and nuns from all sects, as well as laymen and laywomen, with attendees numbering in the thousands. According to an eyewitness account of the great retreat at Ryūmon-ji of 1690, the streets of Aboshi overflowed with pilgrims who had to be sheltered in storerooms, sheds, and barns.

Bankei's home base was his monastery of Ryūmon-ji, which had been built for him by Kyōgoku Takatoyo (1655-1694). He also founded two more monasteries: Nyohō-ji in Sanuki (Shikoku) and Kōrin-ji in Edo (Azabu district). However, no continuing lineage of Bankei's survives, and his temples were eventually taken over by "Hakuin Zen."

== Teachings ==
=== Background ===
Bankei is perhaps most famous for his teaching of the Unborn (Japanese: fushō 不生). The Unborn (also fushō fumetsu 不生不滅, "unborn and undying," or "no creation and no annihilation") derives from the Sanskrit term, anutpāda (no-birth, no-arising, not-born, non-produced, no-origin). (Note: Sanskrit Dictionary for Spoken Sanskrit, Anutpāda) The Indian tradition sees the term anutpāda as an aspect of the ultimate truth, emptiness; since emptiness does not arise or cease, it is not born and never dies. The term is also used in the Lankavatara Sutra, where it is equated with emptiness. According to D.T. Suzuki, anutpāda is not the opposite of utpāda (arising) but transcends opposites. It is the seeing into the true nature of existence, the seeing that "all objects are without self-substance." The phrase fushō fumetsu 不生不滅 (unborn undying) also appears in the Heart Sūtra. (Note: See also the following from the Pāli Canon: “There is, monks, an unborn, unbecome, unmade, unconditioned. If, monks there were not that unborn, unbecome, unmade, unconditioned, you could not know an escape here from the born, become, made, and conditioned. But because there is an unborn, unbecome, unmade, unconditioned, therefore you do know an escape from the born, become, made, and conditioned.”)

=== The Unborn ===
According to Bankei's teaching, the Unborn is the Buddha Mind which "smoothly manages each and every thing." This Buddha Mind is described by Bankei throughout his sermons as "unborn and marvelously illuminating" (reimei 霊明), as it is before thought and it is by means of it that we are able to see, hear, recognize and distinguish all things without giving "birth" to any intention to do so. According to Bankei, because one's Buddha Mind is unborn and marvelously illuminating, it recognizes and distinguishes all phenomena naturally and without any forethought. He likens this function to that of a bright mirror, which reflects without conscious intention. As Bankei explains, "With the dynamic function of the marvelously illuminating Buddha Mind, every object that comes before your eyes is individually recognized and distinguished without your doing a thing. So, even though you're not trying to do so, you recognize thousands of different impressions by sight or by sound."

Throughout his sermons, Bankei would teach with what he called the "proof of the Unborn." As his listeners were facing him with the sole intention of hearing his words, he would point out the way in which they could naturally hear and distinguish all kinds of unanticipated things, such as the cawing of birds, the cry of tradesmen selling their wares, or the sudden coughing of someone in the audience—all without any forethought or intention. For Bankei, as this hearing was without any deliberate effort, this was proof that the Unborn was already at work in one's life, smoothly managing everything. Thus, one has only to leave everything to it, and function with it in all one's affairs. According to Bankei, all that is required is to acknowledge the Unborn with faith:

...all you've got to do is acknowledge with profound faith and realization that, without your producing a single thought or resorting to any cleverness or shrewdness, everything is individually recognized and distinguished of itself. And all because the marvelously illuminating Buddha Mind is unborn and smoothly manages each and every thing.

Bankei provided various examples to demonstrate the way in which the Unborn functions spontaneously in one's life. For instance, when a person touches fire they immediately know it's hot, without having to depend on deliberation. Similarly, one who travels from one place to another arrives without having to deliberately keep their destination in mind every step of the way. What's more, for Bankei, "Whether you're making a fist or running about, it's all the unborn functioning of the Buddha Mind." (Note: Compare with the Bloodstream Sermon, attributed to Bodhidharma: "Buddha is Sanskrit for what you call aware, miraculously aware. Responding, perceiving, arching your brows, blinking your eyes, moving your hands and feet, it's all your miraculously aware nature." And: "...this mind is subtle and hard to see. It's not the same as the sensual mind. Everyone wants to see this mind, and those who move their hands and feet by its light are as many as the grains of sand along the Ganges, but when you ask them, they can't explain it.") Bankei held that the majority of one's daily activities are already perfectly managed by the Unborn, without one even realizing it. It is just that, with the remaining portion, one produces thoughts and attaches to things, and when one imagines that one operates solely through one's own discrimination and cleverness, one falls into error. Thus, Bankei said:

Let things take care of themselves, and whatever comes along will be smoothly managed—whether you like it or not! That's the [working of the] Buddha Mind and its marvelously illuminating dynamic function. Like a mirror that's been perfectly polished, without producing a single thought, with no awareness on your part, without even realizing it, each and every thing is smoothly dealt with as it comes from outside. Not understanding this, you people take all the credit and act as if you managed everything yourselves by means of cleverness! That's why you can't help remaining deluded.

Bankei also explained that the Unborn is neither a self-power nor an other-power. As he observed, since one is able to hear and distinguish things without giving rise to any intention, the Unborn isn't dependent on one's own self-power. On the other hand, Bankei pointed out that since nobody else can do one's hearing for them, it can't be called an other-power either. In this way, Bankei taught that the Unborn transcends both self-power and other-power. He said:

...that which isn't concerned with self-power or other-power but transcends them both is what my teaching is about. Isn't that right? When you listen this way with the Unborn, you transcend whatever there is. And all the rest of your activities are perfectly managed like this with the Unborn too. For the man who functions with the Unborn, whoever he may be, all things are perfectly managed. So, whoever he is, the man of the Unborn isn't concerned with either self-power or other-power, but transcends them both.

=== Not struggling against thoughts ===
Since the Unborn is the innate natural state which is always present, there is no need to use any specific techniques, words or methods; one merely needs to let go of illusion born of selfish desire, dualistic thought and fixations (nen). However, becoming free of these does not require any contrivance or mental struggle. Bankei says trying to stop thoughts from arising divides one mind into two, with the thought of trying to stop them warring against the arising thoughts themselves. Bankei says this is like trying to wash away blood with blood. Instead of struggling against thoughts, Bankei's teaching lay in "neither trying to prevent nor trying to encourage further thought." (Note: Compare with vipassana-meditation and Krishnamurti's choiceless awareness.) This is also to "just have faith that thoughts don't originally exist, but only arise and cease temporarily in response to what you see and hear, without any actual substance of their own."

Similarly, Bankei taught:

You have to realize that your thoughts are ephemeral and unreal and, without either clutching at them or rejecting them, just let them come and go of themselves. They're like images reflected in a mirror. A mirror is clear and bright and reflects whatever is placed before it. But the image doesn't remain in the mirror. The Buddha-mind is ten thousand times brighter than any mirror and is marvelously illuminative besides. All thoughts vanish tracelessly into its light.

According to Bankei, when one has difficulty with this, it is because one still thinks there is some special method for letting thoughts come and go. Bankei instead likens one who lets thoughts come and go without clinging to little children who are busy at play: one is neither concerning oneself about whether to stop one's thoughts nor not to stop them.

=== Criticism of "devices Zen" ===
Bankei didn't set up any particular rules for practice. For Bankei, apart from clearly recognizing the Buddha-mind, no special devices or methods were necessary. He said, "If the Buddha-mind is clearly realized, that's enough. You need do nothing else—no practice, no precepts, no zazen or koan study. Nothing like that. You'll be free from care, everything will be taken care of, just by being as you are."

Bankei was critical of Zen teachers who required "devices" in order to guide people, saying they were engaging in "devices Zen." Bankei said his teaching was different since it did not rely on techniques and merely pointed out the ultimate directly: "Unlike the other masters everywhere, in my teaching I don't set up any particular object, such as realizing enlightenment or studying koans. Nor do I rely on the words of the buddhas and patriarchs. I just point things out directly, so there's nothing to hold onto, and that's why no one will readily accept [what I teach]."

Bankei referred to kōans disparagingly as "old wastepaper." As Haskel points out, Bankei saw the kōan method as a hopelessly contrived and artificial technique.

== Influence ==
Hakuin, a near-contemporary of Bankei, strongly condemned what he called "Do-nothing Unborn Zen," which he associated with Bankei.

According to D.T. Suzuki, Bankei is one of the most important Japanese Zen masters, together with Dogen and Hakuin, and his Unborn Zen is one of the most original developments in the entire history of Zen thought.

== See also ==
- Buddhism in Japan
- Index of Buddhism-related articles
- List of Rinzai Buddhists
- Secular Buddhism
- Ajatavada

== Sources ==
Printed sources

- Bhattacharya, Vidhushekhara (1943), Gauḍapādakārikā, Delhi: Motilal Banarsidass
- Dumoulin, Heinrich (2005), Zen Buddhism: A History. Volume 2: Japan, World Wisdom Books, ISBN 9780941532907
- Renard, Philip (2010), Non-Dualisme. De directe bevrijdingsweg, Cothen: Uitgeverij Juwelenschip
- Ryoen, Minamoto (1999), Three Zen Thinkers. In: Buddhist Spirituality. Later China, Korea, Japan and the Modern World; edited by Takeuchi Yoshinori, Delhi: Motilal Banarsidass
- Suzuki, Daisetz Teitarō (1999), Studies in the Laṅkāvatāra Sūtra, Delhi: Motilal Banarsidass
- The Unborn: the Life and Teachings of Zen Master Bankei, translated by Waddell, Norman, North point Press, 2000, ISBN 0-86547-595-4

Web-sources
