= Gudō Toshoku =

Gudō Toshoku (1577–1661) was a Japanese Rinzai school zen monk from the early Tokugawa period.

== Biography ==
He was a leading figure in the Ōtōkan lineage of the Myōshin-ji, where he led a reform movement to revitalize the practice of Rinzai. He served three times as abbot of Myōshin-ji. Among his leading disciples was Shidō Bunan (Munan)(1603–1676), the teacher of Shoju Rojin (Dokyu Etan)(1642–1721), who in turn was the principal teacher of Hakuin Ekaku (1685–1768). The illustrious Zen preacher Bankei Yōtaku earlier in life wanted to meet Gudō and receive confirmation of enlightenment, but narrowly missed seeing him at his Daisen-ji temple in Mino province (today's Gifu prefecture) because the master was visiting up in Edo (Tokyo). Gudō received the posthumous title Daien Hôkan Kokushi (national teacher). He left no written words.

== Teachings ==
Gudō Toshoku left few written records or sayings. The best-known is a conversation with the Emperor:

Go-Yozei: “It is my understanding that according to the teachings of Zen this very mind, just as it is, is Buddha. Is that correct?”

“If I agree with what you say,” Gudo responded, “your majesty will believe you understand without actually doing so. However, if I deny what you say, I will be denying something well known to all.”
“Then tell me,” the retired emperor persisted, “a man who comes to enlightenment—what happens to him after he dies?”
“I don’t know,” Gudo admitted.
“You don’t know? Aren’t you an enlightened teacher?”
“I am. But not a dead one,” Gudo pointed out.

The emperor was stymied for a moment, unsure how to proceed. Just before he started to speak again, Gudo brought his hand down hard on the wooden floor and the sound brought the emperor to awakening.

In late life, he said:

After all these years of journeying about, here I am knocking at the gates of Zen. I have to laugh. My staff is broken; my umbrella torn. And the teaching of the Buddha is so simple: when hungry, eat; when thirsty, drink; when cold, wrap yourself in a good warm cloak.

Just before dying, he wrote

My task is done. Now those who follow me must work for the benefit of all humankind.

== Sources ==
- Baroni, Helen Josephine (2002), The illustrated encyclopedia of Zen Buddhism, The Rosen Publishing Group
- McDaniel, Richard Bryan (2013), Zen Masters of Japan. The Second Step East, Tuttle Publishing
