= Shūhō Myōchō =

Japanese Zen buddhist teacher

Shūhō Myōchō / Daitō Kokushi
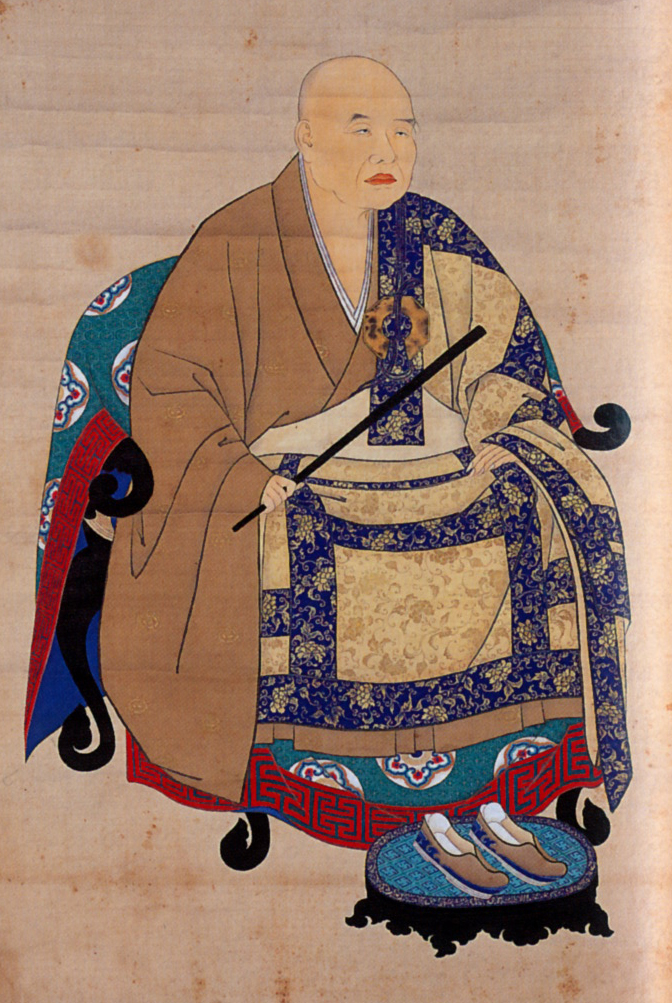
- Title: Zen Master, National Daitō Teacher

Personal life
- Born: 1283 Hyogo, Japan
- Died: 1 January 1338 (aged 55) Daitoku-ji, Kyoto, Japan

Religious life
- Religion: Buddhism
- School: Rinzai

Senior posting
- Teacher: Nanpo Shōmyō
- Predecessor: Rujing
- Successor: Kanzan Egen

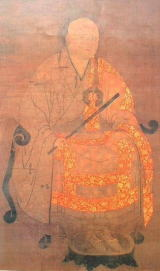
Portrait of Daitō Kokushi from 1334. National Treasury of Japan

Shūhō Myōchō (宗峰妙超; ur. 1283, zm. 1338), aka Daitō Kokushi (大燈 國 師), was a Japanese Zen master of the Rinzai school. He was the second patriarch of the Ōtōkan-lineage, and founder and first abbot of the Daitoku-ji (大德寺) in Kyōto, one of Japan's most important temples.

== Biography ==
He was born in the Harima province near today's Osaka, in the present-day Hyōgo Prefecture. He was an extremely developed child and at the age of 10 he was very disappointed in the world. He was educated by the master Winai. He devoted himself to studying the Buddhist teachings, mainly the "tendai" schools on Mount Shosha, but even these did not fully satisfy him. So he began to practice meditation while still a young man. Soon he went on a pilgrimage to monasteries and hermitages in Japan.

At the age of 21, around 1304, he arrived in Kyoto and entered the Manju monastery, which was then run by Kōhō Kennichi. He diligently practiced and lived his first enlightenment experience, which was confirmed by Kōhō. At that time he heard about the Zen master Nanpo Shōmyō who, at the invitation of the former emperor Go-Uda (後 宇 多, Pan. 1274–1287), came to Kyoto in 1304. Shūhō became his student and when Nampo moved to Kamakura to lead Kenchō-ji, he went there with his teacher.

Ten days after arriving in Kamakura, Shūhō experienced great enlightenment. This happened while he was practicing with kōan known as the "barrier" Yunmen Wenyan (864–949). Basically all this kōan consists of three students' answers to a question posed by Cuiyan Lingcan, Yunmen's dharmic brother: "I have been giving lectures for a long time recently. Now tell me, does Cuiyan have any eyebrows at all?" The first monk said, "The thief surely knows in his heart that he is a thief." The second monk said: "I don't think they fell out with this chatter, but they grew more!" Yunmen without saying anything shouted: "Xian!" (Japanese kan , "barrier"). After concentrating on this case for ten days, Shūhō suddenly found himself in a state of nonduality where all the opposites were in agreement and all Dharma was absolutely clear. Drenched in sweat, he ran to the master to express his deepest understanding, but before Nampo said anything, he knew what had happened and said, "Yesterday I dreamed that the great Ummon (Chinese:" Yunmen ") personally came to my room. today it is you – the second Ummon ". Shūhō covered his ears and ran out of the room.

After penetrating the barrier of clouds,
A living road opened to the north, east, south, and west.
In the evening – rest, in the morning – a tramp, neither the host nor the guest.
A clear wind breaks with each step.

After penetrating the barrier of clouds, there is no old way
The azure sky and bright sun are my home place.
The ever-changing wheel of free action is difficult to achieve.
Even the gilded monk Kashyapa bows respectfully and returns.

To confirm his experience, Nampo gave the disciple a ceremonial robe (skt Kasaya , Japanese kesa ).

Nampo made his disciple the heir of his Dharma, but he also advised him to wait twenty years before accepting disciples, which he devoted to meditating and deepening his understanding. After the teacher's death in 1308, Shūhō devoted himself to post-Enlightenment practices for a while. He was in a small hermitage, hungry and cold, near Ungo-ji on East Mount. He was completely devoted to the Zen tradition and copied 30 volumes "Keitoku dentōroku" in just 40 days. It is also known that he spent many of the following years among the beggars and the poor in the streets of Kyoto, until the emperor Hanazono (花園, lord. 1308–1318) found him under the bridge in Gojo. (Note: Apparently their meeting was as follows: the emperor decided to check who is the beggar that is being talked about in Kyoto. He took the makuwa melons, Shūhō's favorite delicacy, and addressed the mob of beggars, "I will give the melon to anyone who can come for him without using their feet." Nobody moved. Suddenly, Shūhō came out of the crowd and said, "Give me one without using your hands") Traditionally, it is believed that Shūhō was taken straight to the palace, where he was presented with monastic robes. The emperor eventually became his apprentice.

In 1315, Shūhō built a hermitage in the Murasakino district, which he called Daitoku (Great Virtue). (Note: In the northwest of Kyoto) His reputation in Kyoto grew, and his conversations and discussions with the Emperor Go-Daigo (後 醍醐; 1318–1339) grew more cordial. In 1324, the emperor allocated considerable and expensive land for a new Daitoku monastery, the construction of which was supported by friends and benefactors. In 1325, he had a debate with the monks of the "tendai" and "shingon" schools in which he made such an impression on the emperor that he raised the status of Daitoku-ji to the level of Nanzen-ji. In February 1327, the monastery was consecrated in the presence of two emperors, the former – Hanazono, and the present – Go-Daigo. Shūhō became the abbot of the monastery.

The master stayed in the monastery for the rest of his life, except for 100 days in 1331, when he went to Sōfuku-ji on Kyushu, a monastery dedicated to the memory of Nanpo Shōmyō, and became its abbot.

At the age of 55, he fell ill with a terminal disease. He handed over the running of the monastery to his apprentice Tettō Gikō (1295–1369) and expressed his wish not to build stupa for him. He sat down in a meditation position, but could not take the lotus position due to foot problems. Just before he died, he managed to put his left foot on his right thigh, breaking a bone in the process. He then wrote his farewell poem:

I cut off all Buddhas and patriarchs;
[The sword's] undisturbed hair is always shiny;
When the wheel of free action turns,
A vain emptiness gritting its teeth.

== Uwagi ==
Shūhō in his teachings always referred to the chan tradition, and the two masters of the Song dynasty – Xutang Zhiyu and Dahui Zonggao period were closest to him. His practice was focused on sitting meditation (Chinese "zuochan", Japanese "zazen"), kōan practice (which he considered indispensable for anyone wishing to genuinely explore his self), and the experience of enlightenment.

His demeanor resembled a chan Linji Yixuan master. Just like he did not take any half measures. The students had to turn completely inward to seek their own self, they had to make every effort to achieve enlightenment, they had to become (as Linji emphasized) truly homeless.

Shūhō also placed great emphasis on strict adherence to monastic rules. The strictness of the related directives was unequivocal.

He was essentially the first Japanese Zen master to equal Chinese masters. Thus, the process of transferring the chan to Japan was complete – the student was equal to the master.

- Daitō Kokushi goroku

== Zen Dharma lineage ==
The first number represents the number of generations since the First Khan Patriarch of India Mahakashyapa.

The second number represents the number of generations since the First Patriarch of Khan in China Bodhidharma.

The third number marks the start of a new line of transmission in another country.

- 52/25. 'Songyuan Chongyue' (1139 – 1209
  - 53/26. 'Wuming Huixin' (1160–1237)
    - 54/27. 'Lanxi Daolong' (1213–1278)
  - 53/26. 'Yun'an Puyan' (1156–1226)
    - 54/27. 'Xutang Zhiyu' (1185–1269)
      - 55/28/1. 'Nanpo Shōmyō' (1235–1309) '(also Shōmyō; Daiō Kokushi) Japan. The rinzai school.
        - 56/29/2. 'Hōō Soichi' (1274–1357)
          - 57/30. 'Daichū Sōshin' (bd)
            - 58/31. 'Gettan Sōkō' (1326–1389)
        - 56/29. 'Shūhō Myōchō' (1282–1338) '(also Daitō Kokushi)'
          - 57/30. 'Tettō Gikō' (1295–1369)
            - 58/31. 'Gongai Sōchū' (1315–1390)
              - 59/32. 'Kesō Sōdon' (1352–1428)
                - 60/33. 'Ikkyū Sōjun' (1394–1481)
                - 60/33. 'Yōsō Sōi' (1379–1458)
                  - 61/34. 'Shumpo Sōki' (1416–1496)
                    - 62/35. 'Jitsuden Sōshin' (1434–1507)
                      - 63/36. 'Kogaku Sōkō' (1465–1548)
                        - 64/37.
                          - 65/38. 'Shōrei Sōkin' (1489–1568)
                            - 66/39. 'Kokei Sōchin' (1515–1597)
                            - 66/39. 'Shun'oku Sōen' (1529–1611)
                              - 67/40. 'Kōgetsu Sōgan' (1574–1643)
                              - 67/40. 'Kobori Enshū' (n / a)
                            - 66/39. 'Ittō Shōteki' (1539–1612)
                              - 67/40. 'Takuan Sōhō' (1573–1645) left no heirs
          - 57/30. 'Kanzan Egen' (also Muso Daishi) '(1277–1360)

== Bibliography ==
- Kraft, Kenneth. Eloquent Zen: Daitō and Early Japanese Zen. University of Hawai'i Press, 1992. ISBN 9780824813833.
- Richard Bryan McDaniel (2013). Zen Masters of Japan. The Second Step East. Rutland, Vermont: Tuttle Publishing. p. 317. ISBN 978-4-8053-1272-8.
- Heinrich Dumoulin (1988). Zen Buddhism: A History. Japan. New York: Macmillan Publishing Company. p. 509. ISBN 0-02-908250-1.
