= Gasan Jitō =

Zen master

Gasan Jitō was a Zen master in the Japanese Rinzai school. He received dharma transmission from Rinzai teacher Gessen Zen'e, a student and dharma-heir of Kogetsu Zenzai, before meeting Hakuin. Deeply impressed, he started koan-study with Hakuin, completing it under Tōrei Enji tutelage. Gasan is considered to be a dharma heir of Hakuin, though "he did not belong to the close circle of disciples and was probably not even one of Hakuin's dharma heirs." (Note: According to Besserman, Gasan Jitō received dharma transmission from Hakuin.) After completing his training, Gasan Jitō moved to Rinsho-in, a small temple in Edo where he had more than five-hundred students. He and/or his students Inzan Ien and Takuju Kosen created the contemporary Rinzai koan-curriculum; the latter two out of the "raw koan system" inherited from Gasan.

== Sources ==
- Besserman, Perle; Steger, Manfred B. (2011), Zen Radicals, Rebels, and Reformers, Wisdom Publications Inc., ISBN 9780861716913
- Dumoulin, Heinrich (2005), Zen Buddhism: A History. Volume 2: Japan, World Wisdom Books, ISBN 9780941532907
- Ku, Yu-hsiu (2016). History of Zen. Springer.
- McDaniel, Richard Bryan (2013), Zen Masters of Japan. The Second Step East, Tuttle Publishing
