= Zazen Wasan =

Type of Buddhist hymn

Zazen Wasan (Japanese: 坐禅和讃) is a wasan, a type of Buddhist hymn written in Japanese, composed by Hakuin Ekaku, a Rōshi of the Rinzai school of Zen Buddhism. Zazen Wasan was written in or around the year 1760 (recorded as the 10th year of the Hōreki era), the topic of which is a praise of the virtues of Zazen, or "seated meditation". The Zazen Wasan also praises the virtues of original enlightenment and seeing one's own nature. Zazen Wasan is still chanted in Rinzai temples.

Zazen Wasan has been translated into English by several different authors and scholars, including a translation by D. T. Suzuki in 1935.

The name Zazen Wasan is most commonly translated into English as "Song of Zazen", although it is sometimes also variously translated as "Hymn of Zazen", "Hymn in Praise of Zazen", or "Chant in Praise of Zazen".
