= Kanzan Egen =

Japanese Buddhist monk

Kanzan Egen (関山慧玄/關山慧玄)
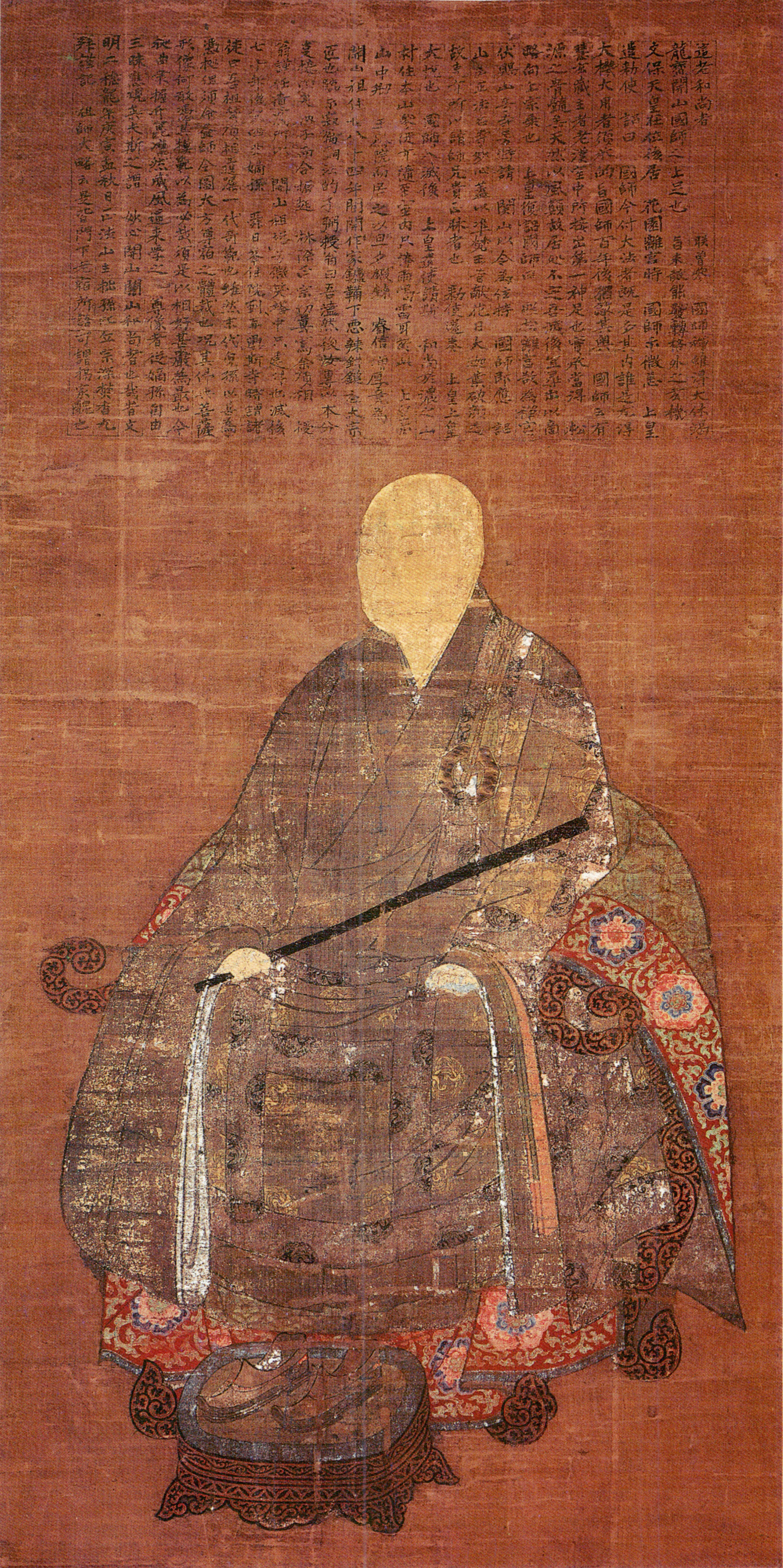

Personal life
- Born: January 7, 1277 Shinano Province, Japan
- Died: 1360 (aged 82–83) Kyoto, Japan
- Other name: Muso Daishi (無相大師)

Religious life
- Religion: Buddhism
- School: Rinzai Zen, Myōshin-ji Branch

Senior posting
- Teacher: Nanpo Jōmyō and Shūhō Myōchō
- Successor: Juo Sohitsu (授翁宗弼)

Kanzan Egen (関山慧玄/關山慧玄) (1277–1360) was a Japanese Rinzai Zen Buddhist monk, founder of Myōshin-ji Temple and a principal member of the extant Ōtōkan lineage, from which all modern Rinzai Zen derives. Centuries later, Emperor Meiji conferred the posthumous name Muso Daishi (無相大師) to Kanzan.

== Biography ==
Kanzan Egen was born in Shinano Province on January 7, 1277. He initially studied Rinzai Zen Buddhism under Nanpo Jōmyō, who received dharma-transmission from China and later under Nanpo Jōmyō's student, Shūhō Myōchō. After Shūhō Myōchō confirmed Kanzan Egen's enlightenment, Kanzan went to Mino Province and dwelt in the Ibuki Mountains for intensive training.

During this time, Emperor Hanazono recalled Kanzan to the capitol to help found a new temple which became Myōshin-ji Temple.
