= Tōrei Enji =

Japanese Zen master and principle heir of Hakuin

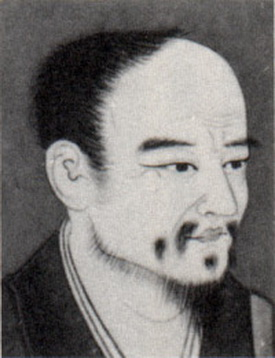

Tōrei Enji (東嶺円慈) (8 May 1721 - 10 April 1792) was an eminent Japanese Zen Buddhist monk, teacher, author, painter and calligrapher. He was the chief disciple and heir of famed Japanese Rinzai master Hakuin Ekaku (1685–1786). He wrote an influential text on Zen practice called "The Undying Lamp of Zen" (Shūmon mujintō ron), which gives an overview of Hakuin's views and practices with regard to the Buddhist path.

== Biography ==
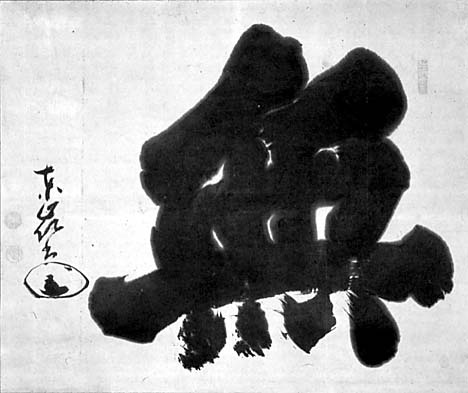
Calligraphy of "Mu" by Tōrei

Tōrei born in Kazaki, Shiga prefecture. When he was 5 years old, he met the Zen master Kogetsu Zenzai (1667–1751). This inspired him to begin his studies at a local monastery at the age of 9. When he was 17 he went to Daikō-ji in Kyushu, where he was ordained as a Buddhist monk by Kogetsu Zenzai. Under the direction of Kogetsu, Tōrei attained his first kenshō.

After this experience, he set out on a pilgrimage to various Japanese monasteries. In 1743, Kogetsu suggested that he should visit Shōin-ji, where Tōrei was to meet the great Rinzai master Hakuin Ekaku and study Zen with him.

Tōrei stayed with Hakuin until he received a message from home about his mother's illness. He looked after her for two years until her death.

After his mother's death, he went to a small hermitage in Kyoto, where he undertook a very rigorous and ascetic training, which ended with a deep realization. However, as a result of practicing in cold conditions he developed tuberculosis. Unsure if he would survive, he decided to write the text Shūmon mujintō ron (The inexhaustible lamp of Zen). He was thirty years old at the time. After he was finished, his health had improved. He sent the text to Hakuin who wrote back saying that it was an excellent introduction to Zen practice. The work presents the Zen path according to the teachings he received from Hakuin and attempts to promote the unity of all Buddhist schools under the Ekayana (One Vehicle) view of Zen. His work also attempts to reconcile Zen Buddhism with Confucianism, Shintoism and Taoism.

After his health improved, Tōrei began a teaching career that would last for 40 years. He received Hakuin's robe and thus became his principle Dharma heir.

After Hakuin's death, Tōrei retired to Ryutaku-ji and he remained there for twenty years overseeing its restoration. Towards the end of his life Tōrei returned to a small temple in his hometown, where he died in 1792.

== Influence ==
All contemporary Rinzai-lineages stem from Hakuin and Torei, through Gasan Jitō (1727–1797), who received Dharma transmission from Rinzai teacher Gessen Zen'e, before meeting Hakuin, and his students Inzan Ien (1751–1814) and Takuju Kosen (1760–1833). Gasan is considered to be a dharma heir of Hakuin, though "he did not belong to the close circle of disciples and was probably not even one of Hakuin's dharma heirs," studying with Hakuin but completing his koan-training with Tōrei Enji.

== See also ==
- Buddhism in Japan
- List of Rinzai Buddhists
- List of Buddhist topics
- Religions of Japan

== Sources ==
- Besserman, Perle; Steger, Manfred B. (2011), Zen Radicals, Rebels, and Reformers, Wisdom Publications Inc., ISBN 9780861716913
- Dumoulin, Heinrich (2005), Zen Buddhism: A History. Volume 2: Japan, World Wisdom Books, ISBN 9780941532907
- McDaniel, Richard Bryan (2013), Zen Masters of Japan. The Second Step East, Tuttle Publishing
- Stevens, John (1999), Zen Masters. A Maverick, a Master of Masters, and a Wandering Poet. Ikkyu, Hakuin, Ryokan., Kodansha International
