= Xutang Zhiyu =

Chinese Chan monk

Xutang Zhiyu 虚堂智愚 (Japanese Kido Chigu, nickname Sokkō) (1185–1269) was a Chinese Chan-monk who gave dharma-transmission to Nanpo Shōmyō (1235–1308), the founder of the Japanese Rinzai Zen Ōtōkan-lineage. His style of koan practice was admired and emulated by Hakuin Ekaku, and today it's the only existing line of dharma-transmission in Japanese Rinzai Zen.

== Writings ==
- The Record of Empty Hall, a collection of hundred koans with commentaries from Xutang Zhiyu
