= Buddha-mind =

Zen-term referring to both bodhicitta and Buddha-nature

Buddha-mind (Chinese foxing, Japanese busshin (Note: Oxford Reference, busshin, from Damien Keown, "A Dictionary of Buddhism")) refers to bodhicitta, "[the] Buddha's compassionate and enlightened mind," and/or to Buddha-nature, "the originally clear and pure mind inherent in all beings to which they must awaken." (Note: Compare "Buddha's compassion, Buddha's heart," and "The term “buddha-mind” also functions in certain cases as a synonym for Buddhadatū (foxing) or tathagatagarbha.")

== Explanation ==
Regarding awakening, Harold Stewart explains:

In Buddhist terminology this all-decisive moment is known as the Awakening of the Buddha-Mind, or Bodaishin [...] There are three practically synonymous terms in the Mahayana for this: Bodaishin (Sanskrit: Bodhicitta); Busshin, literally 'Buddha-Heart' of Great Compassion (Sanskrit: Tathagatagarbha, or the latent possibility of Buddhahood inherent in all beings); and Bussho (Sanskrit: Buddhata), or the Buddha-nature.

Busshin may also refer to Buddhakaya, the Buddha-body, (Note: Japanese Dictionary, busshin) "an embodiment of awakened activity." (Note: Thich Nhat Hanh, The Three Gems, TriCycle)

Chan/Zen is also called foxin zong (Chinese) or busshin-shū (Japanese), the "Buddha-mind school."

== See also ==
- Svasaṃvedana
- Transmission of the Lamp
- Guanyin

== Sources ==
Printed sources

- Buswell; Lopez (2014), The Princeton Dictionary of Buddhism, Princeton University Press
- Moore, Charles A. (1982), The Japanese Mind: Essentials of Japanese Philosophy and Culture, University of Hawaii Press
- Waddell, Norman (2010a), Foreword to "The Essential Teachings of Zen Master Hakuin: A Translation of the Sokko-roku Kaien-fusetsu", Shambhala Publications

Web-sources
