= Wasan Important Bird Area =

Important Bird Area in Brunei

Coordinates: 04°46′59″N 114°49′00″E

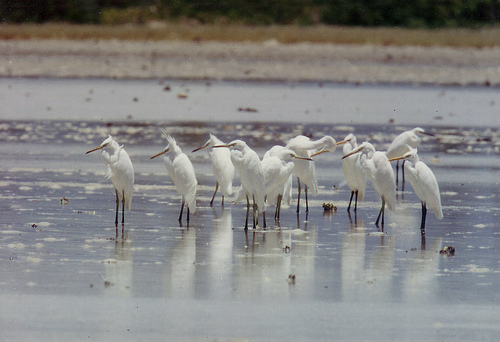
Chinese egrets, classified as vulnerable, visit the IBA during the non-breeding season.

The Wasan Important Bird Area comprises a tract of some 1,000 ha of rice paddies in the vicinity of the village of Kampong Wasan, in the Brunei-Muara District of Brunei, in north-western Borneo. It has been identified by BirdLife International as an Important Bird Area (IBA) because it supports significant numbers of the populations of various bird species, including lesser adjutants, Chinese egrets, green sandpipers and straw-headed bulbuls.
