= Shidō Bu'nan =

Japanese Rinzai Zen monk

Shidō Bu'nan (Munan) (1603–1676) was a Japanese Rinzai Zen monk, and the teacher of Shoju Rojin (1642–1721), who was the principal teacher of Hakuin Ekaku (1686–1769).

== Biography ==
Born in Sekigahara as the son of an inn-keeper (just like Hakuin), at age 14 Munan started Zen-Studies with Gudō Toshoku (1577–1661) in Kyoto as a lay-practitioner. He was assigned the koan "from the beginning not a thing exists," a quote attributed to Huineng, the sixth Zen-patriarch. Returning to Sekigahara to work at the inn, he kept practicing, tutelaged by Gudō when he was around. Munan took over the inn, married, but eventually became addicted to drinking and gambling. In 1656, after a reprimand form Gudo, Munan broke with his addictions and became his attendant, following him to Edo and becoming a monk. He evaded the Rinzai-hierarchy, criticising it's failings such as a compromised koan-system and an over-emphasis on developing literary and artistic skills. In his teachings, he asserted that awakening is not an end in itself, but the beginning of the true practice of the Buddha-way:

Even though a man leaves his home and lives simply with his three robes and a bowl on a rock under a tree, he still cannot be called a true Buddhist priest [...] Yet if he does wish earnestly to become a true priest, he will realize that he has many desires and is possessed of a body which is endowed with eighty-four thousand evils, of which the cardinal five are sexual desire, cupidity, birth-and-death, jealousy, and desire for fame. These evils are the way of the world. They are by no means easy to overcome. Day and night, by means of enlightenment [awakening], you should set yourself to eliminating them one after another, thus purifying yourself.

== Writings ==
- Ryūtakuji Shozō Hōgo (1666)
- Sokushinki (On the mind, 1670), tr. Kobori Sōhaku, Norman A. Waddell
- Jishōki (On self-nature, 1672), tr. Kusumita Priscella Pedersen
- Bunan zenji dōka shū (1844)

== Sources ==
- McDaniel, Richard Bryan (2013), Zen Masters of Japan. The Second Step East, Tuttle Publishing
