= Manju-ji =

Rinzai Buddhist temple in Kyoto, Japan

Manju-ji 万寿寺
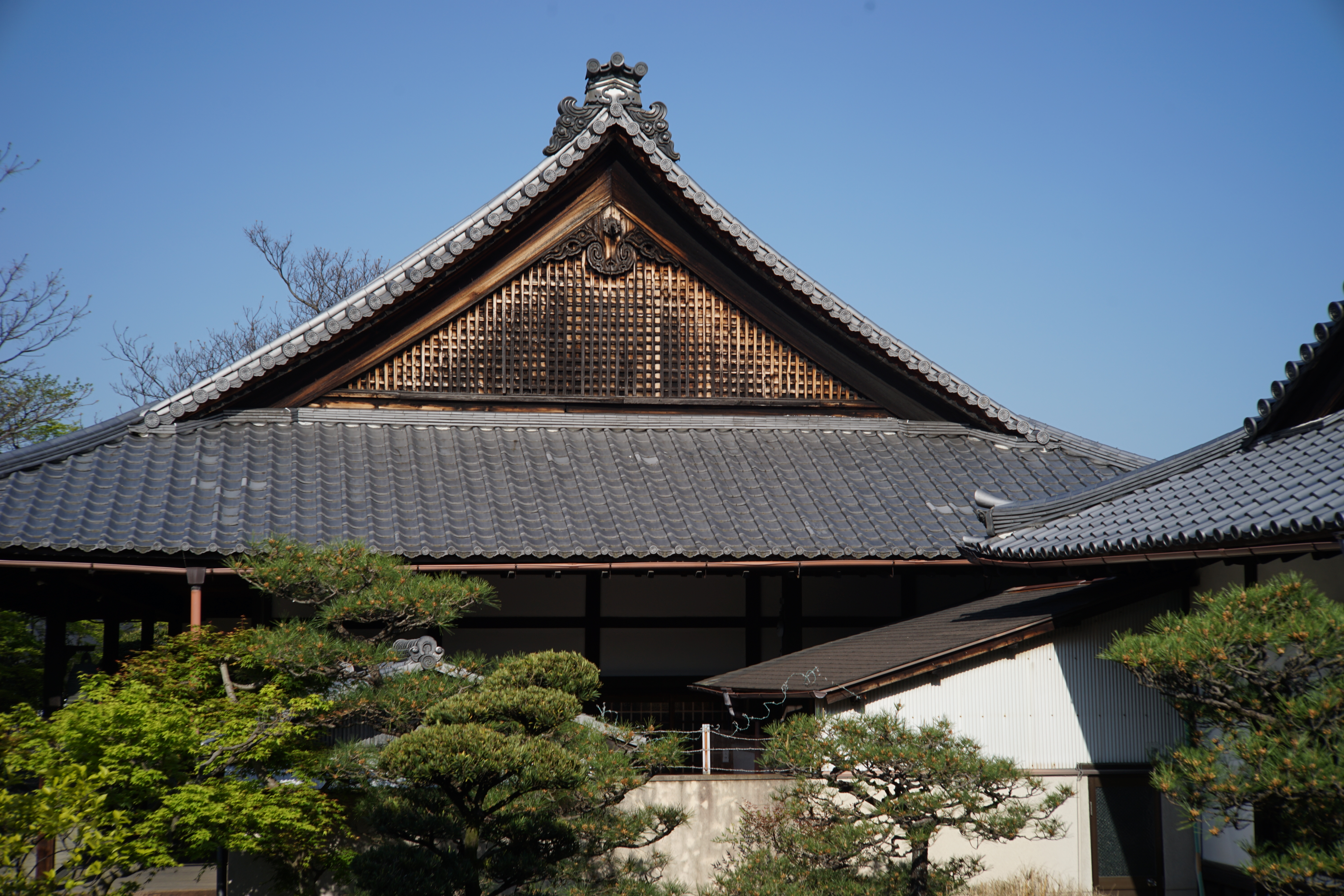

Religion
- Affiliation: Tōfuku-ji Rinzai
- Deity: Amida Nyorai (Amitābha)
- Status: Five Mountain Temple (Kyoto)

Location
- Location: 15-Chōme 786 Honmachi, Higashiyama-ku, Kyōto, Kyoto Prefecture
- Country: Japan
- Interactive map of Manju-ji 万寿寺
- Coordinates: 34°58′52.1″N 135°46′15.9″E

Architecture
- Founder: Emperor Shirakawa
- Completed: Heian period (late 13th century)

Manju-ji (万寿寺) is a Rinzai Buddhist temple in Higashiyama-ku Kyoto, Japan. Owing to the influence of the Ashikaga, Manju-ji was designated a Jissatsu temple for a time. At present, it is a sub-temple of Tōfuku-ji. It is considered to be one of the so-called Kyoto Gozan or "five great Zen temples of Kyoto".

== History ==
Manju-ji was founded in the middle Heian period (late 13th century). In 1305, Nanpo Shōmyō (南浦紹明) (1235–1308) was appointed abbot of Manju-ji.

In 2012, the monastery participated in the so-called East-West Spiritual Exchanges organised by the Institute for Zen Studies of Hanazono University and the Monastic Interreligious Dialogue (DIMMID) in which Buddhist and Christian monks or nuns take turns residing for one month in each other’s monasteries.

== Artwork ==
An artistically noteworthy Amida figure is too large to be moved from Manju-ji for display elsewhere. The temple holds a collection of esoteric Buddhist art which was traditionally used in teaching the salient points in the story of the life of Gautama Buddha.

== See also ==
- List of Buddhist temples
- List of Buddhist temples in Kyoto
