= Kogetsu Zenzai =

Japanese Rinzai Zen monk

Kogetsu Zenzai (1667–1751) was a Japanese Rinzai Zen monk who emulated Ōbaku-teachings into Japanese Rinzai Zen. His teacher Kengan Zen'etsu (1618–1696) had trained under Chinese Ōbaku-monks, and Kogetsu Zenzai was one of the principal persons in assimilating their teachings. In contrast, Hakuin Ekaku (1686–1768) opposed their influence, yet also stressed the need for rigorous practice. A number of influential students of Kogetsu Zenzai eventually also studied with Hakuin, creating the koan-system presently used within Japanese Rinzai-Zen.

== Sources ==
- Ahn, Juhn Y. (2019), "Hakuin", in Kopf, G. (ed.), The Dao Companion to Japanese Buddhist Philosophy, Springer
