= Nanpo Shōmyō =

Japanese Zen Buddhist master

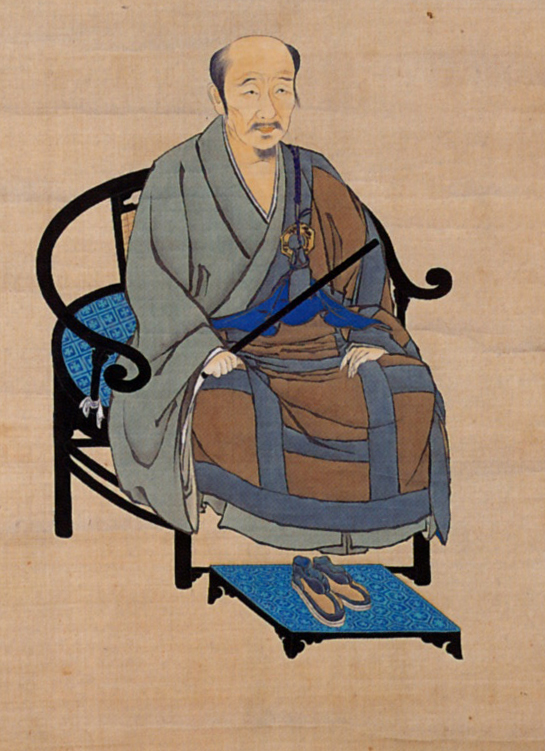
- Portrait of Nampo Shomyo (1836), Hanging Scroll, Color on silk
- Title: Enzū Daiō Kokushi (圓通 大 應 國 師)

Personal life
- Born: 1235 Suruga, Japan
- Died: 1309 (aged 73–74) Kenchō-ji, Japan
- Education: い

Religious life
- Religion: Buddhism
- School: Rinzai
- Lineage: Yangqi Fanghui

Senior posting
- Successor: Shūhō Myōchō

Nanpo Shōmyō (Japanese: なんぽしょうみょう, Kanji: 南浦紹明; 1235 – 9 February 1309), imperial name Entsū Daiō Kokushi, was a Japanese Zen monk of Rinzai school during the Kamakura period, and the founder of the Ōtōkan-lineage. Although his exact origin is unknown, he is from Inomiya village, Abe District, Shizuoka (now Inomiya-chō, Aoi-ku, Shizuoka). Shōmyō is his true name (also "Jyōmin"), Nampo is his Dharma name.

== Life ==
Nanpo Shōmyō grew up and studied at his hometown's temple, Takyō-ji. In 1249 he began studying Zen under Lanxi Daolong at Kenchō-ji. In 1259 he traveled to Song China and received dharma-transmission from the monk Xutang Zhiyu (Kidō Chigu). In 1267 he returned to Japan and Kenchō-ji, staying until 1270, when he moved Kōtoku-ji in Chikuzen Province. In 1272 years he became the chief priest at Sōfuku-ji. In 1304, at the invitation of Emperor Go-Uda, he entered Manju-ji. In 1307 he returned to Kenchō-ji. He died at the age of 75 in 1309. He was the master of Kyōō Unryō and Shūhō Hyōchō.

In December 1309, Emperor Go-Uda awarded him the Kokushi name of "Entsū Daiō", which is the beginning of Zen monks receiving the Kokushi name in Japan. Following him, Shūhō Hyōchō received Daitō Kokushi and then Kanzan Egen received Muso Daishi. The names of the three monks formed the Ōtōkan lineage.

== Historical landmark ==
Nanpo Shōmyō's birthplace in now Inomiya-chō, Aoi-ku, Shizuokain Shoichi has a hot water well that is now a Cultural Property of Shizuoka City known as "Daiō Kokushi Well".

== Biography ==
- Araki, Kengo 荒木見悟, (1994). Daiō : Goroku. Tōkyō: Kōdansha. ISBN 4062502038
