= Dōkyō Etan =

Japanese Rinzai Zen monk

Dōkyō Etan (Shoju Rojin, "The Old Man of Shōju Hermitage") (1642–1721) was a Japanese Rinzai Zen monk, and the principal teacher of Hakuin Ekaku (1686-1769).

== Biography ==
Shoju Rojin received inka, the seal of approval, from Shidō Bu'nan (Munan) (1603–1676) after studying only one year with him, but declined to succeed him as his formal dharma-successor. He stayed the rest of his life at a small hermitage, Shoju-an. He was critical of the state of practice of the Rinzai-temples of his time. According to his student Hakuin, who stayed with him for eight months, he emphasized the need for rigorous practice, instead of developing artistic skills or practicing the nembutsu, the repetition of the mantra of the Pure Land school, a practice common in Chinese chan and the Ōbaku-school.

== Influence ==
While Hakuin stayed with Shoju Rojin for only eight months, and didn't receive dharma-transmission or inka, in later life Hakuin regarded him as his principal teacher. Shoju Rojin's critical stance was emulated by Hakuin, who also avoided the Rinzai-establishment, and resorted to a small temple, where he eventually attracted a large number of students. While Hakuin's descendants formalised the koan-study into a system with set answers, Hakuin, and with him his teacher's attitude, is regarded as the reviver of Rinza-Zen, stressing the importance of prolonged practice through koan-study and regular meditation.

== Sources ==
- Hakuin (2010), Introductory to Lectures On the Records of Old Sokko (Sokko-roku kaien fusetsu). In: The Essential Teachings of Zen Master Hakuin: A Translation of the Sokko-roku Kaien-fusetsu, translated by Norman Waddell, Shambhala Publications
- McDaniel, Richard Bryan (2013), Zen Masters of Japan. The Second Step East, Tuttle Publishing
