= Wasan =

Wasan (和讃) are a type of Japanese Buddhist hymn composed in native Japanese language (wago). The word is meant to distinguish Japanese hymns from those composed in Sanskrit (bonsan 梵讃) or Chinese (kansan 漢讃). These works sing of the teachings and deeds of buddhas, bodhisattvas and soshi (the founders of schools of monks). They are composed in verses of alternating seven and five syllables, with each hymn consisting of four or more such verses. They were composed from the addition of a melody to a Buddhist service (法会 hōe) or teaching (教化 kyōke), and became popular starting in the Heian period. These hymns in colloquial Japanese played an important part in the spread of Buddhism throughout Japan and among the members of the lower classes. The Fusō Ryakki includes a hymn composed by Gyōki extolling the virtues of the Buddhist dharma, which is a valuable tool for understanding the function of wasan. Wasan fell out of popularity during the Edo period.

== See also ==
- Waka (poetry)
