= Nōhime =

Wife of Oda Nobunaga (1500s-1600s)

Nōhime (also known as Kichō)
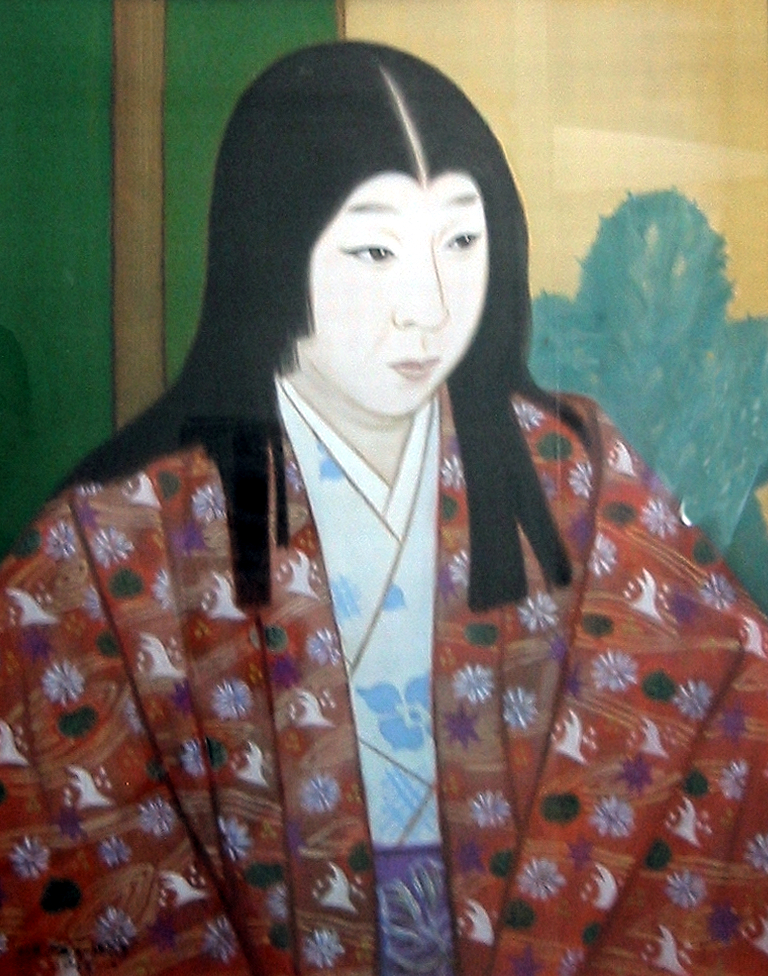
- Portrait of Nō in Gifu Castle
- Born: 1530s (?); Japan
- Died: 1612 (?); Kyoto, Japan
- Known for: Marriage to Oda Nobunaga during the Sengoku period
- Spouse: Oda Nobunaga

Nōhime, Nohime (濃姫; lit. 'Lady Nō'), also known as Kichō (帰蝶) was a Japanese woman from the Sengoku period to the Azuchi–Momoyama period. She was the daughter of Saitō Dōsan, a Sengoku Daimyō of the Mino Province, and the lawful wife of Oda Nobunaga, a Sengoku Daimyō of the Owari Province.

== Profile ==
There are very few reliable historical documents about Nōhime, and little is known about her real identity. Shinchō Kōki, which is considered to be of historical value, contains only a brief description of her marriage, after which her name does not appear at all.

The exact dates of her birth and death are unknown, and Minonokuni Shokyūki (Note: Minokuni Shokyūki is a local journal in the mid-17th century during the Edo period by an unknown author, and contains many errors.) states that she was born in 1535. While the first half of her life can be traced to some extent, the second half of her life is not known, nor is the date of her death, her family temple or her commandments, and various theories are mixed up.

== Name ==
At that time, it was common for women's real names (imina) not to be made public, and it was normal for them to be addressed as 'Place of birth or Parental residence' + 'Dono (殿) or Hime (姫) or Kata (方)'. Therefore, Nōhime's real name is not known like the majority of women of that era. Even in Shinchō Kōki, she is only mentioned as Dōsan's daughter, but no specific name is given.

The name 'Nōhime' became popular as a result of its appearance in the Edo period's books Ehon Taikōki and Bushō Kanjōki. This was only a later name meaning "Noble Lady of Nō-shū (濃州; lit. 'Nō Province')". (Note: Nō-shū is other name of the Mino province.) She is sometimes referred to as Onō no kata (於濃の方).

Kichō (帰蝶) or Kochō (胡蝶) are mentioned in Edo period books, but it is not certain whether these are their real names. Kichō is only found in Minonokuni Shokyūki. The name Kochō is used in Bukō Yawa. (Note: Bukō Yawa is a war chronicle. The date of its creation is unknown and no original copy has been found.) It is also said that the characters in running form of Ki (帰) and Ko (胡) are very similar, so it is possible that one of them was miswritten when it was transcribed.

In Minonokuni Shokyūki, it is also stated that she was called Sagiyama dono (鷺山殿) because she married into Nobunaga from Sagiyama Castle, her father's residence. This is in accordance with the above-mentioned custom of the time and makes sense.

== Marriage to Nobunaga ==
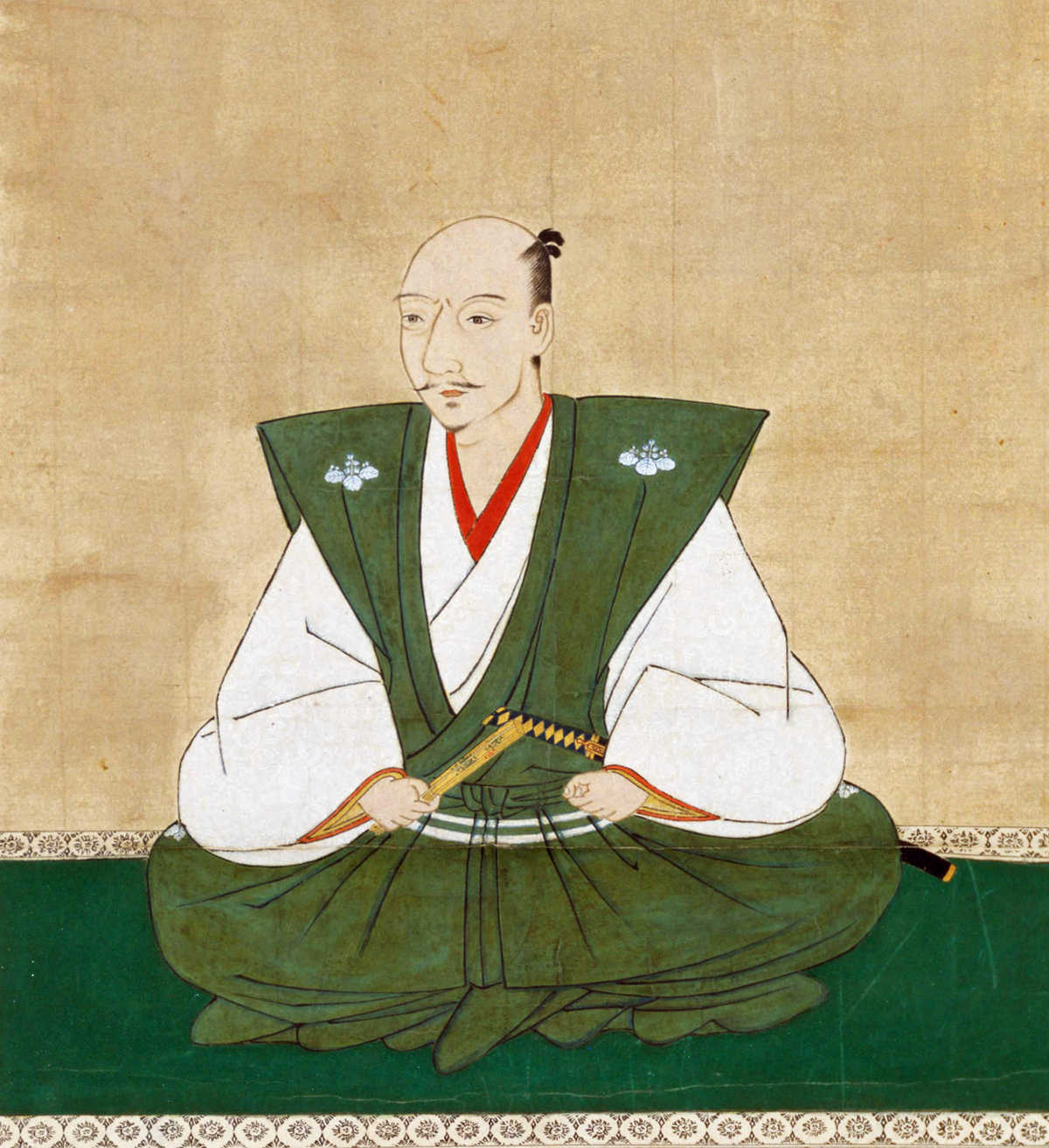
Oda Nobunaga

It is not actually known when she married Nobunaga, nor is it known whether the couple were on good terms or not. As far as reliable documents show, it seems that she had no children with Nobunaga.

In fact, the date of her marriage to Nobunaga is unknown, and there is no specific date written in the Shinchō Kōki. The theory that tends to be adopted in historical fictions is that the marriage took place in the spring of 1549, when Nobunaga was 16 and Nōhime was 15 (both according to East Asian age reckoning).

In war chronicles written in the 17th century, such as Seishū Gunki (Note: Although it contains some exaggerations, it is a compilation of records of interviews with local people and is therefore somewhat more objective than similar works.) and Sōkenki, (Note: The work is highly fictional and of little historical value.) it is stated that she did not have a son, so she adopted Kimyōmaru (Oda Nobutada), who was born to a side wife or concubine, as Nobunaga's legitimate son. It also states that she had a child but not a boy, so she adopted Nobutada and made him Nobunaga's heir.

== Anecdotes ==
There are several well-known anecdotes about Nōhime in the Edo period's Ehon Taikōki and Bushō Kanjōki. The first story is when Nōhime was to marry into the Oda clan. Dōsan handed her a kaiken and told her: 'If Nobunaga is as big a fool as rumoured, stab him to death with that dagger'. Then Nōhime replied: 'I understand. But maybe then this blade will be pointed at you'. The next story is about a year after they were married. Nobunaga began to repeatedly slip out of their bedchamber every night and return a short time later, and when Nōhime questioned him, suspecting an affair, he replied, "I have set up a plot against the retainers of the Saitō clan to cause them to rebel, and I'm waiting for the smoke signal to announce that they have defeated Dōsan". Nōhime was surprised and informed her father about it, and Dōsan killed the retainers whose names were on the letter. But this was Nobunaga's ruse to get Dōsan to kill his retainers. However, all of these are merely Edo period fictions born from the image of the 'daughter of Dōsan the pit viper'.

== Life ==
Nōhime is said to have been born to Saitō Dōsan, a Sengoku Daimyō who rose to lordship of Mino through Gekokujō, and his legal wife Omi no kata (1513–1551), who was known as 'the most beautiful woman in Mino'. The only document describing her date of birth is Minonokuni Shokyūki, which suggests that she was born in 1535. According to Minonokuni Shokyūki, Omi no kata was from the Akechi clan, which was the most famous family in eastern Mino, and Nōhime is said to be the only one of Dōsan's three daughters born to Omi no kata, a legal wife. According to the Genealogy Chart and the Miyagi Family Genealogy Book of the Akechi Clan, Omi no kata was the sister of Akechi Mitsuhide's father, Akechi Mitsutsuna, which means that Nōhime and Mitsuhide were cousins. However, Mitsuhide's origin is unclear, and there are several different genealogies of him, and it is not known which one is correct or even if they are all incorrect.

Saitō Dōsan took advantage of the infighting among the Toki clan of Mino Shugo to extend his power, and became lord of the Mino province after dispossessing his lord Toki Yorinari. He then installed his eldest son, Yoshitatsu, born to his side wife Miyoshino, who had been given to him by Yorinari, as Mino Shugo, claiming that he was Yorinari's illegitimate son, in order to stabilise the unrest in the Mino territory. At that time, Oda Nobuhide of the neighbouring Owari Province, father of Oda Nobunaga, was at enmity with Saitō Dōsan, so he supported Toki Yorinari and invaded Mino. The following is from Minonokuni Shokyūki, so it cannot all be taken on faith, but it is said that Dōsan attempted to conclude a peace on the condition that Oda Nobuhide and Asakura Takakage would each marry his daughter. He pledged to Nobuhide that he would give his daughter in marriage to Nobunaga, Nobuhide's son and heir apparent, and to Takakage that he would make Toki Yorizumi, Takakage's nephew, Mino Shugo and give him his another daughter in marriage.

In 1546, Dōsan made peace with Asakura Takakage and allowed Toki Yorinori and Toki Yorizumi to enter Mino on the condition that Yorinori would hand over his position as Shugo to Yorizumi. As a token of their friendship, he gave his daughter in marriage to Yorizumi. This daughter is said to have been Nōhime, and if it is true, Yorizumi was 23 years old and Nōhime was 12 years old, about to reach adulthood. (Note: The age of adulthood in Japan at the time was around 13-15 years.) Dōsan seized control of Mino by making Yorizumi his puppet, but a year later Yorinori and Yorizumi began preparing to raise an army against Dōsan. Dōsan, sensing this move, took the initiative and attacked, resulting in Yorinori fleeing to the Echizen Province and Yorizumi's death. At the age of only 13, Nōhime became a widow and returned to her father's castle.

Meanwhile, Dōsan fought Nobuhide several times between 1547 and 1548 but was unable to reach a settlement, and a political marriage of several years earlier was rehashed in order to make peace. Nobuhide had been on the losing end of a series of battles with Dōsan and was also beginning an all-out confrontation with Imagawa Yoshimoto, which had him on the ropes. Dōsan, who was not on good terms with his son Saitō Yoshitatsu, also wanted an alliance with Nobuhide. According to Minonokuni Shokyūki, Nobuhide, who was prone to illness, needed Nobunaga's backing amidst the ongoing strife between the Oda clans, and urged Dōsan to fulfil his pledge. According to Shincho Kōki, Hirate Masahide, who was Nobunaga's Moriyaku (Guardian), brokered a truce and the two were to marry. And when a peace agreement between Mino and Owari was concluded, Nōhime went to Owari to marry Nobunaga.

Then, having pacified Mino, Dōsan handed over the governorship to his heir, Yoshitatsu, in 1554 and retired. However, Dōsan disliked Yoshitatsu, the son of his concubine, and was partial to his two younger sons, who were the children of his legal wife (and the younger brother of Nōhime), so he began plotting to eventually abolish Yoshitatsu and have them succeed to his post. When Yoshitatsu learnt of this, he used a feigned illness to kill his younger brothers and raised an army against Dōsan. In 1556, Dōsan was killed by Yoshitatsu in the Battle of the Nagara River.

The last recorded mention of Nōhime was that she donated a portrait of Dōsan to Jozai-ji Temple, the Saitō family's Bodaiji, after which she ceased to exist in recorded history.

== Information about Nōhime after that ==
In the first place, the common record in historical materials about Nōhime is only about her marriage. Therefore, various speculations have been made about what happened to Nōhime afterwards.

There are four main theories about what happened to her after that.

=== Early death theory ===
The theory is that she died soon after her marriage for some reason, such as illness, because there is no information about her in historical documents describing official events of the Oda clan, which she should have attended as a legal wife.

=== Divorce theory ===
There is a theory that Nōhime was divorced in 1557 when Nobunaga's concubine Kitsuno became pregnant with Nobutada, his heir, and was sent back to her mother's family home, Akechi Castle. However, this is considered unlikely, as it is unlikely that a legal wife would be sent back to her parental home because she was unable to have children in an era when having side wives was permitted.

Another theory is that she was banished from the Oda clan after Dōsan's death because she was no longer of any political value and had no children.

=== 'Died in the Honnō-ji Incident' theory ===
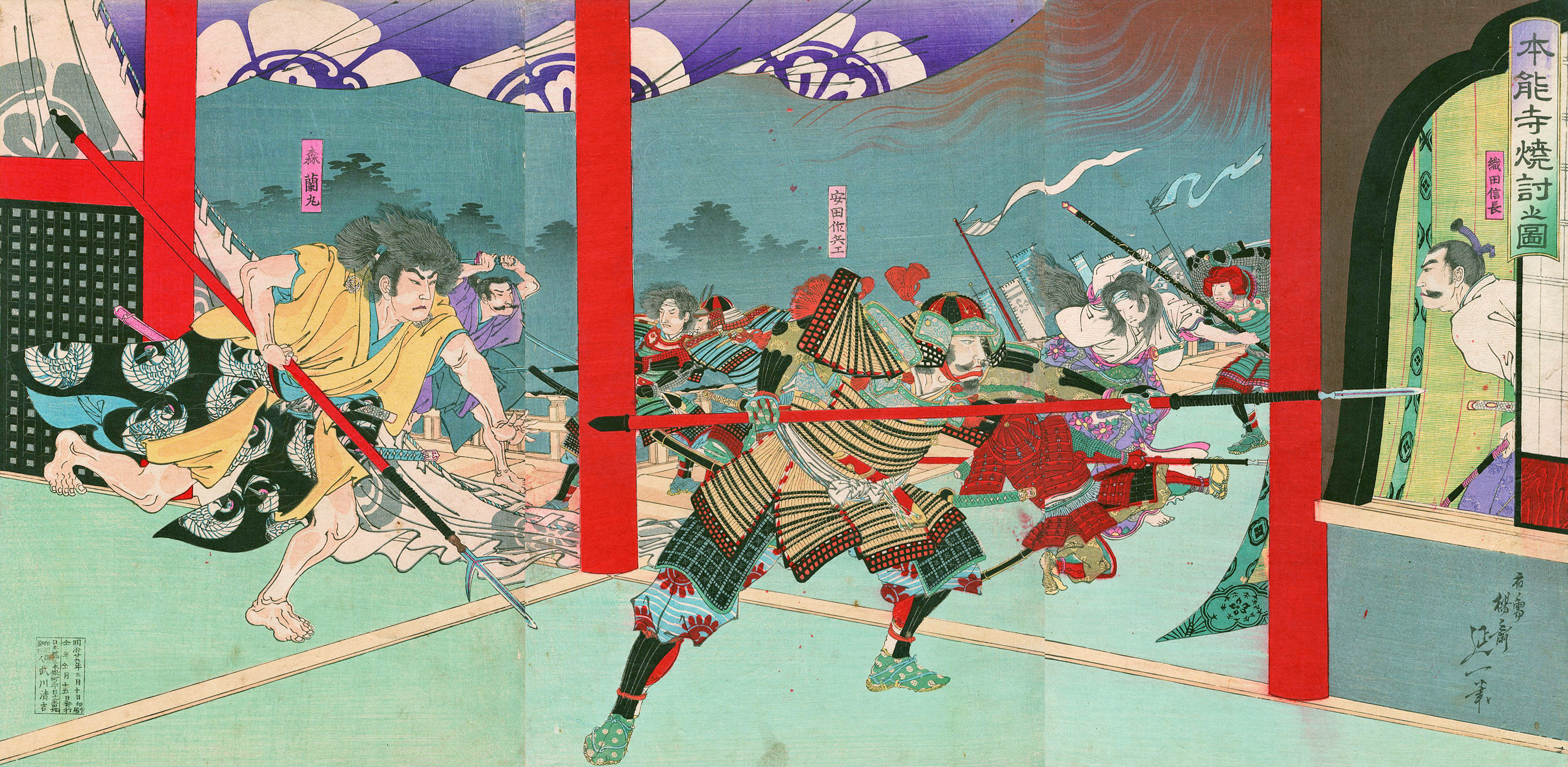
''Honnō-ji burning'' (Nōhime fought with a naginata in the center right.)

The theory is that Nōhime was killed in battle with Nobunaga at the Honnō-ji Incident in 1582. However, there is no record of her death at Honnō-ji in reliable historical sources.

Historical creations have often depicted scenes of Nōhime wielding a naginata sword alongside Nobunaga against enemy soldiers, but there is no evidence of this.

=== Longevity theory ===
Even after the mention of the marriage, a woman thought to be Nōhime appears in several records.

In historical documents by contemporaries, there is a description of Nōhime in Tokitsugu Kyoki, the diary of Kuge (the court noble) Yamashina Tokitsugu, in July 1569, which, if true, would mean that she was alive and well after Yoshitatsu's death. Yamashina introduces this as a story he heard directly from one of the leading samurai during his stay at Gifu Castle, so it is highly credible. Nobunaga enters Gifu Castle after conquering Mino and orders the widow of Saitō Yoshitatsu, who has died of illness, to give him a tea urn that belonged to Yoshitatsu. The widow claims that the tea urn was lost in the war, but Nobunaga is not convinced and presses her for more. When she tells him that she will commit suicide if he forces her to do so any further, Nobunaga is incensed by this and says, "Then you must die". His legal wife then joined the widow and said, "If you don't trust them that much, I will also commit suicide with the Saitō clan". Nobunaga as he was, he was forced to admit that he was wrong. There is also a diary entry in August of the same year, which mentions 'Nobunaga going to see his mother-in-law'. It is assumed that she was Nōhime's birth mother, Omi no kata. It is written that Nobunaga went to his mother-in-law's residence to thank her, and at this time, Nobunaga had Yamashina, with whom he had been interacting, accompany him to the gate of the residence.

Luís Fróis, a Portuguese Jesuit missionary, wrote in his History of Japan that he visited Nobunaga's palace in Gifu, saw the gardens and then visited the gold-decorated rooms of Nobunaga's queen. In 2016, excavations at the site of Nobunaga's residence actually revealed fragments of gold leaf tiles and garden remains. However, it is not proven that this queen refers to Nōhime.

There is no record of Nōhime in Azuchi Castle, and the role of Nobunaga's legal wife was played by his concubine Onabe no Kata. After the Honnō-ji Incident, it was also Onabe no Kata who fulfilled the duty of legal wife to pray for the repose of Nobunaga's soul. However, there are descriptions of women with appellations for legal wives such as Kita no kata (北の方) and Midai (御台) who were among those fled to Hino Castle of the Gamō clan, where Nobunaga's daughter Fuyuhime married, at the time of the Honnō-ji Incident. Onabe no kata had gone to Gifu Castle at this time, and it has been suggested that these names may refer to Nōhime.

In recent years, a woman called Azuchi dono (安土殿) has been attracting attention. Azuchi dono is listed in the Oda Nobukatsu Bugenchō, which describes the distribution of the Oda family and vassal territories around 1587, created by Nobunaga's second son, Oda Nobukatsu. It has been suggested that this woman may be Nōhime. According to the description, Azuchi dono was the third of the woman listed after Nobukatsu's legal wife and his own sister, the fourth being Nobunaga's birth mother and the fifth being Nobunaga's own sister, indicating her high status in the Oda family. It was also assumed that if she was called by the name of Azuchi, Nobunaga's stronghold, she was most likely his legal wife, Nōhime.

The Myōshin-ji History compiled in the Taisho period (1912–1926) states that Lord Nobunaga's wife hosted the first anniversary of his death, which is considered to be different from the famous one hosted by Hashiba Hideyoshi, and therefore may have referred to Nōhime. The woman was buried in 1612 at Nobunaga's family temple, Daitoku-ji Sōken-in in Kyoto, and if both the woman and Azuchi-dono refer to Nōhime, she would have lived a very long life.

== In fiction ==
- In the Samurai Warriors franchise, she is portrayed as a sultry and deadly woman who fights using assassin weapons and bombs. Her relationship with Nobunaga is portrayed as a toxic love, with her always trying to kill her husband and Nobunaga considering it a fun game. However, their relationship tends to change based on the game.
- In the Sengoku Basara game and anime series, she is depicted as a beautiful and elegant woman who is loyal to her husband, with matchlock pistols, jackhammers and guns as weapons.
- In the game Nioh, she appears as a yuki-onna. She was resurrected by the main antagonist and was killed in one-on-one battle with the main protagonist after he is dispatched to Honnō-ji temple to solve mystery behind the snow that appeared out of nowhere in middle of June. In the fight, she uses ice magic and naginata made out of ice. She reappears in the prequel Nioh 2 as the half-sister of the main protagonist Hide, and ends up dying in the Honnō-ji incident alongside her husband Nobunaga.
