= Ty Ty Creek =

Ty Ty Creek may refer to:

- Ty Ty Creek (Warrior Creek tributary)
- Ty Ty Creek (Kinchafoonee Creek tributary)
