= Ōbai-in =

Buddhist sub-temple in Daitoku-ji, Kyoto, Japan

Coordinates: 35°2′30.2″N 135°44′45.8″E

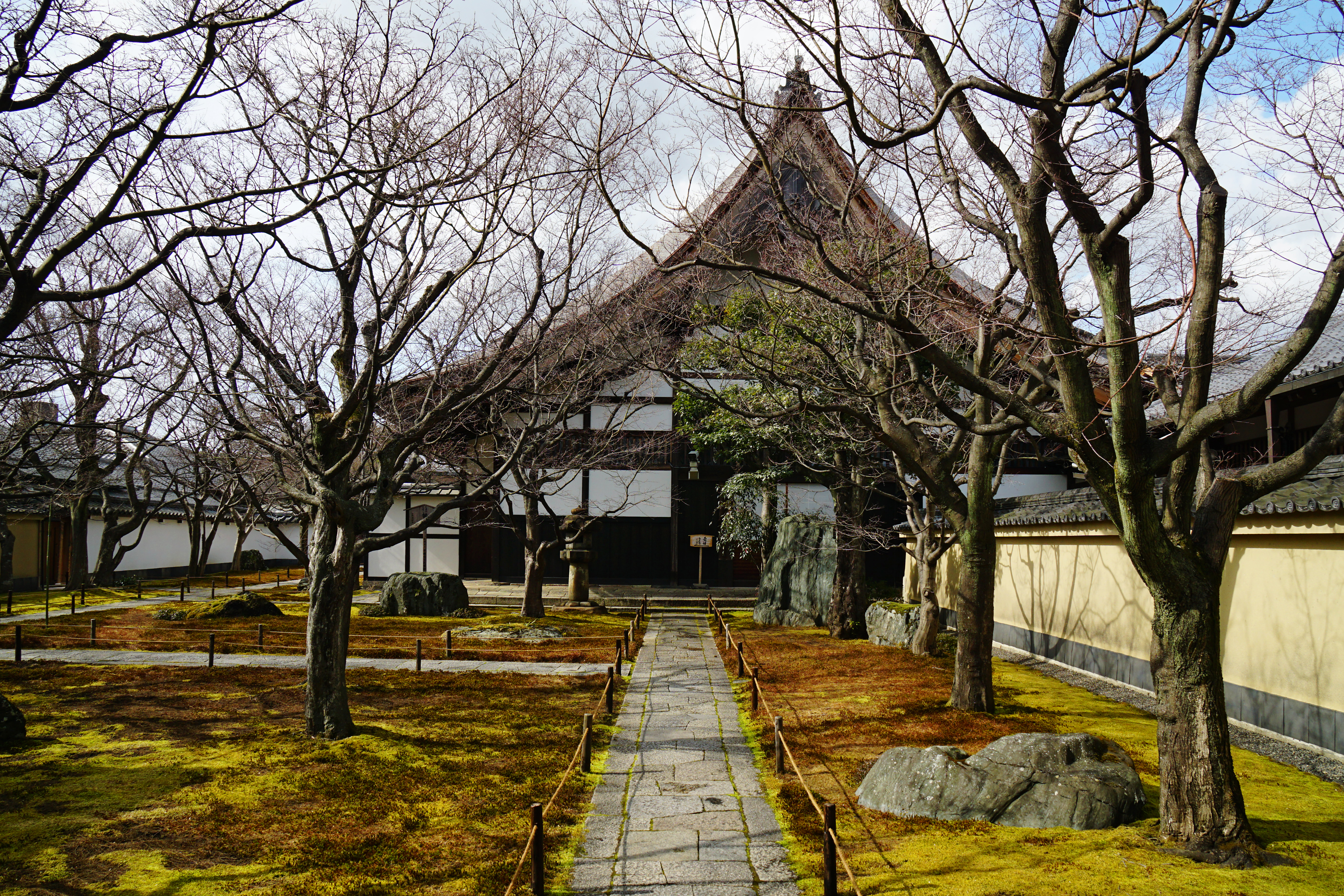
Ōbai-in

Ōbai-in (黄梅院) is an autonomous sub-temple of Daitoku-ji, Kyoto, Japan, the headquarters of the Daitoku-ji school of the Rinzai sect of Zen Buddhism. The Hondō (1586) and Kuri (1589) have been designated Important Cultural Properties. Momoyama period monochrome fusuma paintings of Seven hermits in a bamboo grove (16 panels), Landscape with figures (14 panels), and Geese (14 panels), by Unkoku Tōgan (1588), have also been designated Important Cultural Properties. The severed head of the statue of Sen no Rikyū, its position fatally regarded as hubristic by Toyotomi Hideyoshi, was once kept at Obai-in.

== See also ==
- Daitoku-ji
- Japanese painting
- Important Cultural Properties of Japan
