= Ty Ty Creek (Warrior Creek tributary) =

Stream in Georgia, U.S.

Coordinates: 31°15′7.57″N 83°34′7.60″W

Ty Ty Creek is a stream in the U.S. state of Georgia. It is a tributary to Warrior Creek. Ty Ty Creek has many Cypress Trees along the bank.

Ty Ty Creek derives its name from the titi trees growing near its banks.
