= Jukō-in =

Buddhist sub-temple in Kyoto, Japan

Coordinates: 35°02′38″N 135°44′43″E

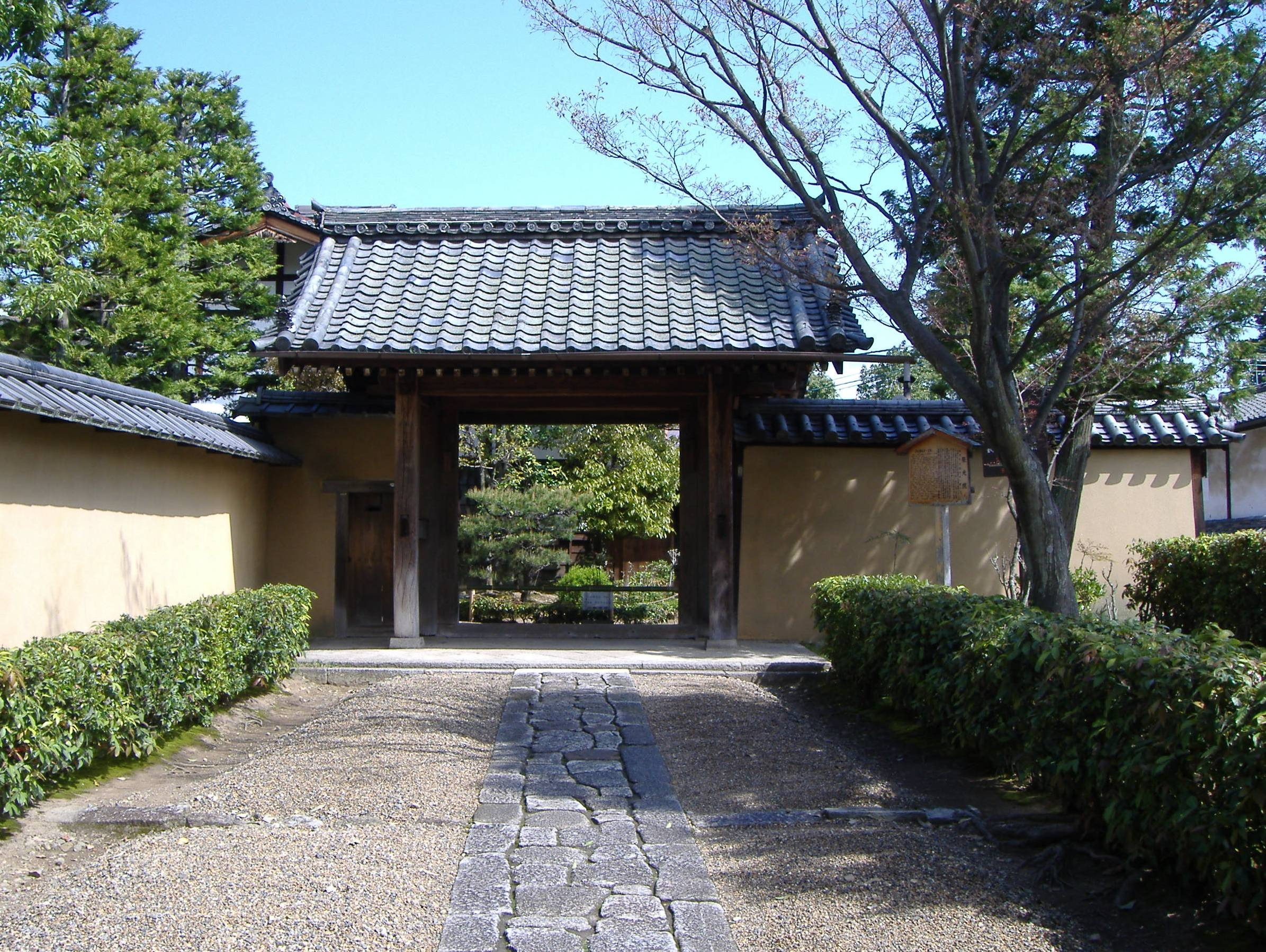
Entrance to Jukō-in, a sub-temple of Daitoku-ji

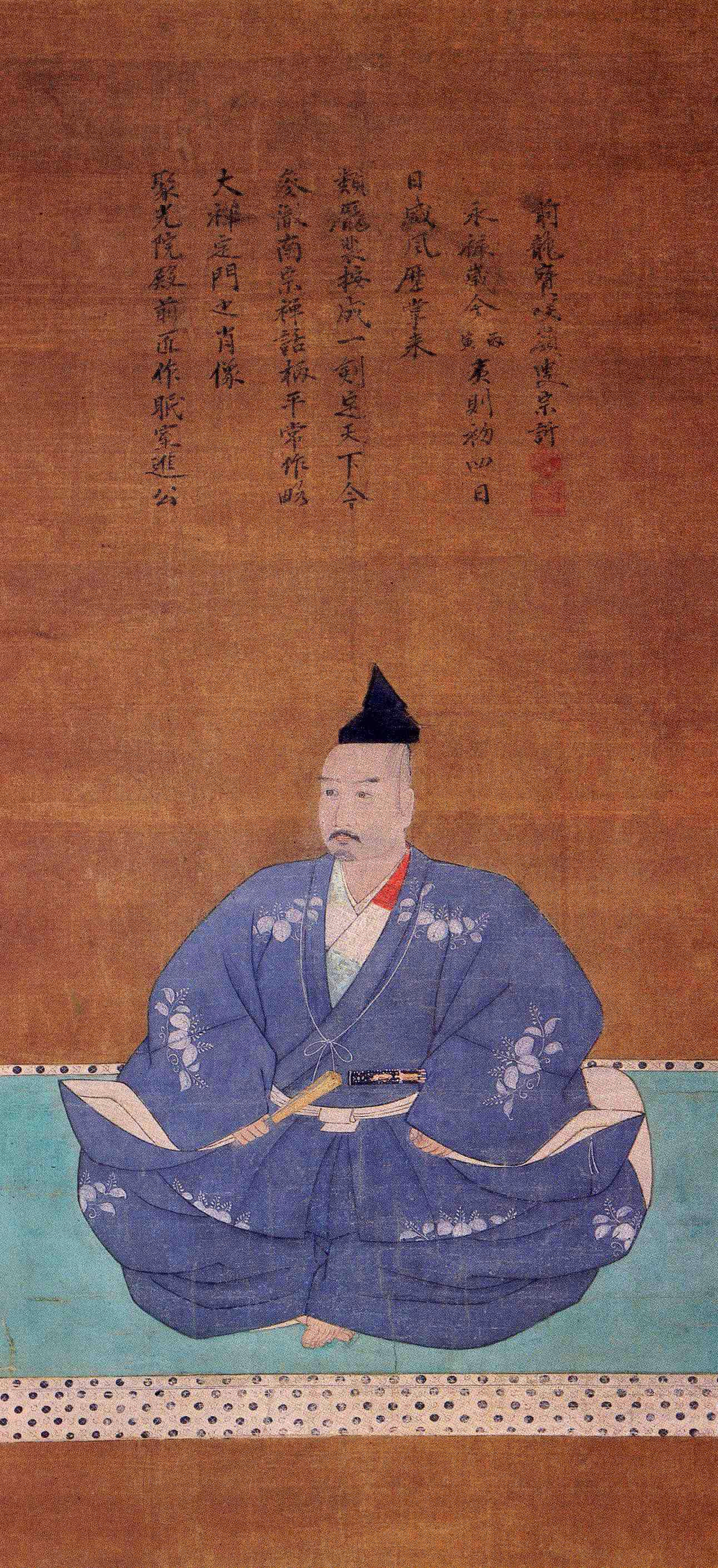
Miyoshi Nagayoshi, painting on silk (1566); an Important Cultural Property

Jukō-in (聚光院) is a sub-temple of Daitoku-ji, Kyoto, Japan. It was founded in 1566 as the mortuary temple of Miyoshi Nagayoshi. In 1589 Sen no Rikyū designated it as the mortuary temple for his family. The Hondō (1583) and chashitsu (1739) are Important Cultural Properties and the gardens have been designated a Place of Scenic Beauty. A painting of Miyoshi Nagayoshi (1566) has also been designated an Important Cultural Property. The temple also contains a great number of fusuma paintings done by Kanō Eitoku.

== See also ==
- Daitoku-ji
- Japanese gardens
- Japanese painting
- List of Special Places of Scenic Beauty, Special Historic Sites and Special Natural Monuments
- List of National Treasures of Japan (paintings)
