= Cypress Trees =

Work of Japanese art

Cypress Trees screen
- Artist: Kanō Eitoku
- Year: 16th–17th century
- Type: Colour on paper with gold leaf
- Dimensions: 170.3 cm × 460.5 cm (67.0 in × 181.3 in)
- Location: Tokyo National Museum; Tokyo, Japan
- Owner: National Treasures of Japan

Cypress Trees (檜図, hinoki-zu) is a Kanō-school byōbu or folding screen attributed to the Japanese painter Kanō Eitoku (1543–1590), one of the most prominent patriarchs of the Kanō school of Japanese painting. The painting dates to the Azuchi–Momoyama period (1573–1615). Now in Tokyo National Museum, it has been designated a National Treasure.

== Painting ==
This Japanese folding screen was made from several joined panels. Screens were used to separate interiors and enclose private spaces, among other uses. This work is considered a representative work of Eitoku, who pioneered the bold "colour and gold" style. The painting is a polychrome-and-gold screen that depicts a cypress tree against the backdrop of gold-leafed clouds, and surrounded by the dark blue waters of a pond. The painting stretches across two four-panel folding screens from around 1590; it is made of paper covered with gold leaf, depicting a cypress tree, a symbol of longevity in Japan.

== Background ==
Commonly attributed to Kanō Eitoku (1543–1590), there is another theory based on a reference to a commission in The Diary of Prince Toshihito (智仁観王日記) that the painting was instead made by Eitoku's younger brother Kanō Sōshū (狩野宗秀). The eight panels originally took the form of four painted shōji, later remounted, which helps account for some of the discontinuities in the image. After the Meiji Restoration the paintings passed from the Katsura-no-miya to the Imperial Household and thence to the nation.

== See also ==
- List of National Treasures of Japan (paintings)
