= Ty Ty Creek (Kinchafoonee Creek tributary) =

Stream in Georgia, USA

Coordinates: 31°56′47.59″N 84°24′52.59″W

Ty Ty Creek is a stream in the U.S. state of Georgia. It is a tributary to Kinchafoonee Creek.

Ty Ty Creek may derive its name from the titi trees growing near its banks. According to another tradition, "Tight Eye" was a name applied on account of thick brush which posed as an obstacle to see through. Variant names are "Tight Eye Creek", "Tight-eye Creek", as well as "Tighteye Creek".
