= Sōken-in =

Buddhist sub-temple in Kyoto, Japan

Coordinates: 35°2′38.6″N 135°44′40.8″E

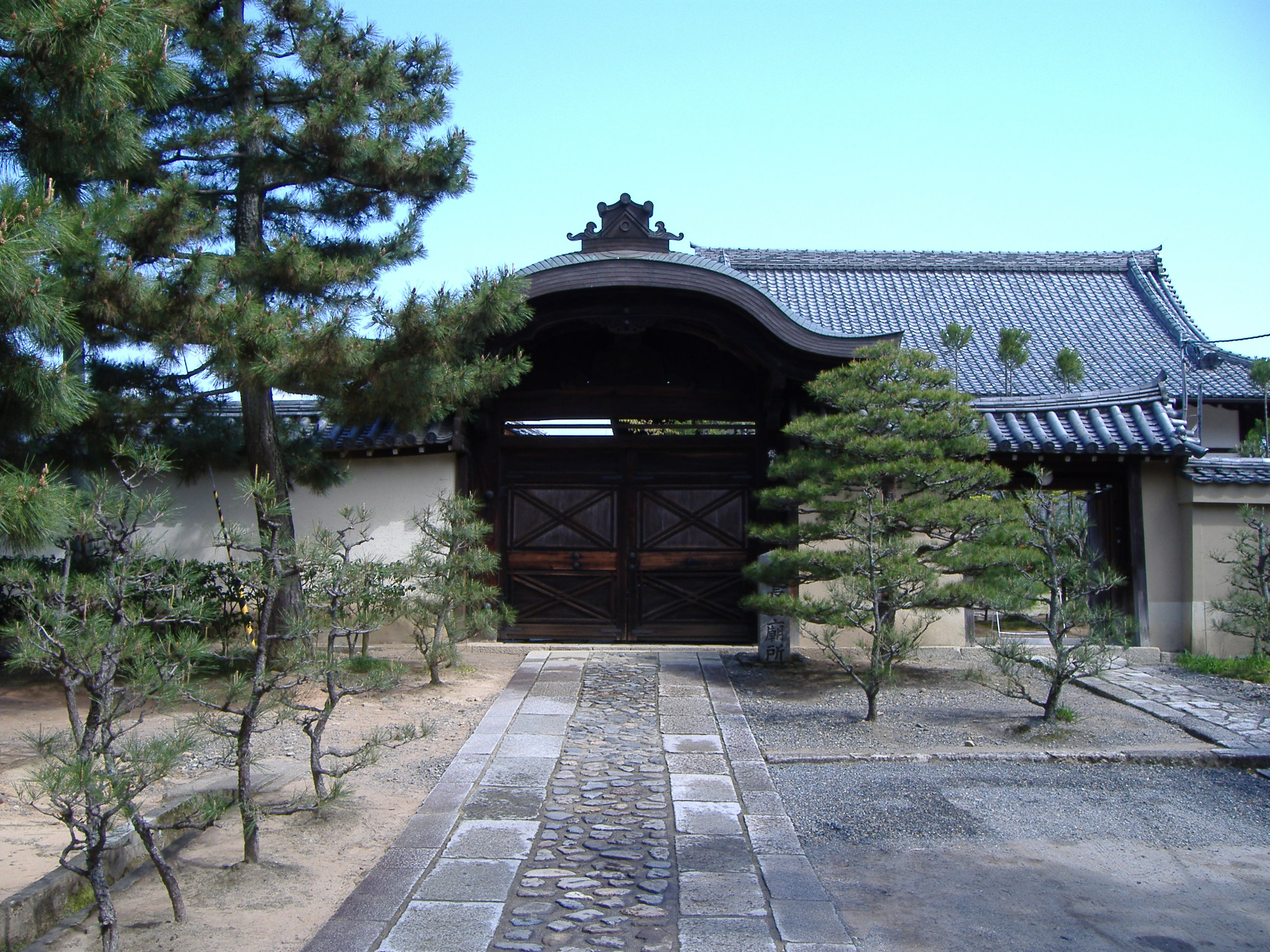
Sōken-in, a sub-temple of Daitoku-ji

Sōken-in (総見院) is a sub-temple of Daitoku-ji, Kyoto, Japan. It was founded by Toyotomi Hideyoshi in 1582 as the mortuary temple of Oda Nobunaga. Hideyoshi granted the temple three hundred koku and staged his celebrated Daitoku-ji tea gathering on its grounds in 1585. During the early years of the Meiji period its precinct was demolished and its treasures relocated; Sōken-in was revived in 1926. The seated wooden statue of Oda Nobunaga of 1583, lacquered, with inlaid eyes and an inscription on the base, an Important Cultural Property, was returned in 1961. Nobunaga's funeral and Hideyoshi's foundation of the sub-temple "with the very best wood available, a remarkable thing to see" was recounted by the Portuguese missionary Luís Fróis in his contemporary História de Japam.

== See also ==
- Daitoku-ji
