= Unkoku Tōgan =

Japanese painter (1547–1618)

Unkoku Tōgan (雲谷 等顔, 1547–1618) was a Japanese painter.

He was born into a privileged family in Nagasaki, the second son of Hara Naoie, lord of Nokomi Castle in Hizen province.

Starting as an artist of the Kanō school, Tōgan's work soon took its inspiration from the style of Sesshu. He painted realistic landscapes, usually ink on paper.

He worked under Lord Mori of Yamaguchi Prefecture. Later, he became a Buddhist priest and abbot of Unkoku-an Temple. He died in Yamaguchi.
