= Daitoku-ji =

Zen Buddhist temple in Kyoto, Japan

Daitoku-ji 大徳寺
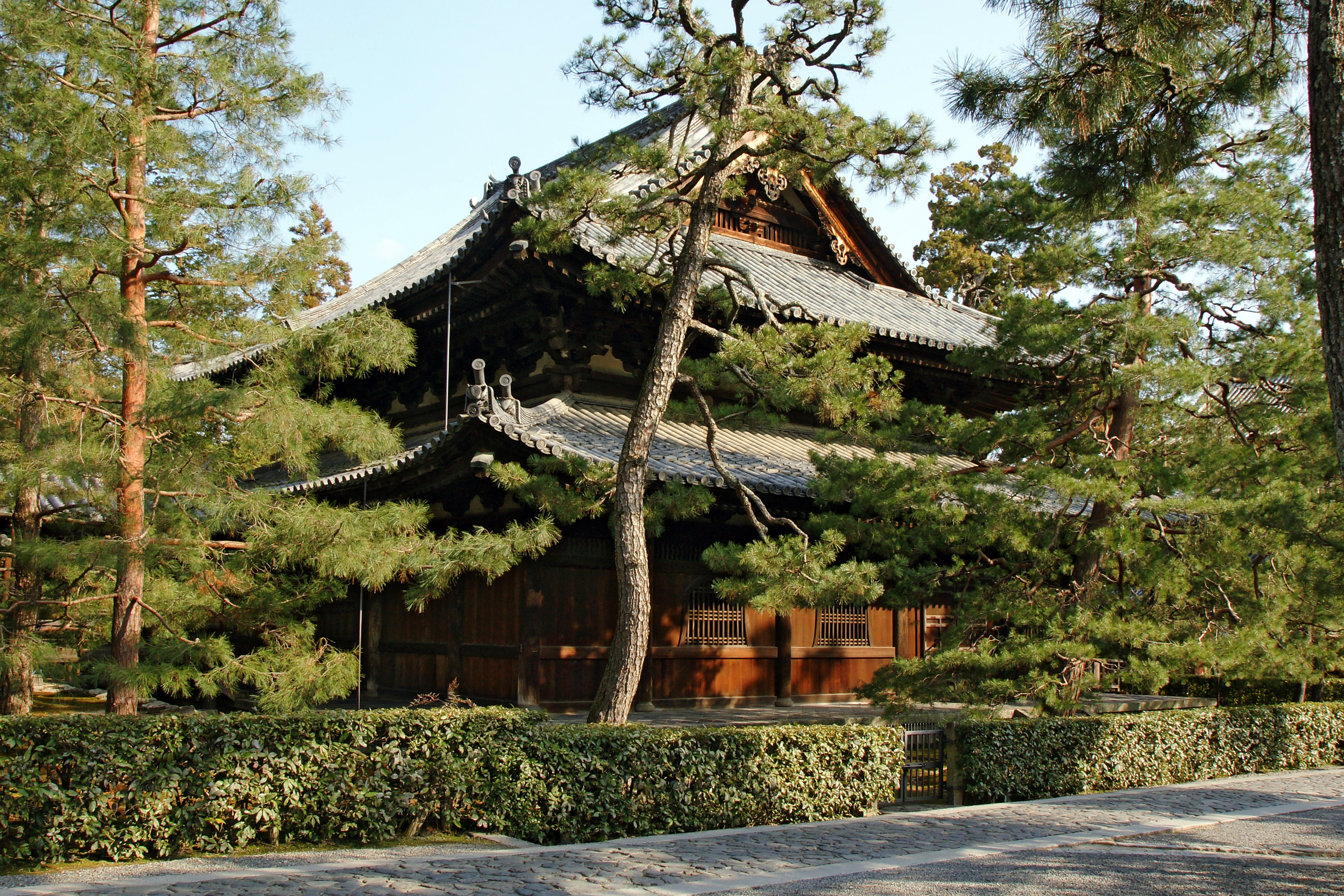
- Butsuden (Hondo)

- Daitoku-ji Daitoku-ji (Japan)

Religion
- Affiliation: Buddhist
- Deity: Shaka Nyorai
- Rite: Rinzai school Daitoku-ji branch

Location
- Location: 53 Murasakino Daitokuji-cho, Kita-ku, Kyoto-shi, Kyoto-fu 603-8231
- Country: Japan
- Coordinates: 35°2′38.10″N 135°44′45.89″E

Architecture
- Founder: Daito Kokushi
- Completed: 1326
- National Place of Scenic Beauty National Historic Site of Japan

Daitoku-ji (大徳寺; the ‘temple of Great Virtue’) is a Rinzai school Zen Buddhist temple in the Murasakino neighborhood of Kita-ku in the city of Kyoto Japan. Its (sangō) is Ryūhōzan (龍宝山). The Daitoku-ji temple complex is one of the largest Zen temples in Kyoto, covering more than 23 hectares (57 acres). In addition to the main temple complex including the Buddha Hall and the lecture hall, there are more than 20 sub-temples on the grounds. Daitokuji has produced many famous monks and has a deep connection with the tea ceremony culture, making it a temple that has had a great influence on Japanese culture. The main temple and sub-temples have many cultural assets, including buildings, gardens, sliding screen paintings, tea ceremony utensils, and calligraphy and paintings from China. The main temple of Daitoku-ji is not open to the public, and many of the sub-temples are also not open to the public.

== History ==
The Zen monk, Shūhō Myōchō (宗峰妙超; also pronounced Sōhō Myōchō; 1282–1337), who is known by the title Daitō Kokushi ("National Teacher of the Great Lamp") given by Emperor Go-Daigo. the founder of Daitoku-ji, was born in 1282 in Harima Province to a vassal of the Akamatsu clan, and Akamatsu Norimura's elder sister. At the age of 11, he entered the local large temple Engyo-ji and studied Tendai Buddhism, but later became interested in Japanese Zen and studied under noted masters at Kenchō-ji in Kamakura. In 1315 or 1319, with the support of Akamatsu Norimura, he built a small temple, Daitoku-an, in Murasakino, north of Kyoto. Cloistered Emperor Hanazono issued an imperial edict in 1325 designating Daitoku-ji as a supplication hall for the imperial court. The dedication ceremony for the imperial supplication hall, with its newly added dharma hall and abbot's living quarters, was held in 1326, and this is generally recognized as the true founding of the temple. Emperor Go-Daigo issued an imperial edict in 1334 elevating Daitoku-ji to a superior position to the Five Mountains of Kyoto. In addition, the temple received donations from successive emperors, including Emperor Kōgon, as well as influential aristocrats such as Nakamikado Tsunetsugu, Prince Moriyoshi, and Nitta Yoshisada, and by 1333 it had a total of 7,600 koku of estates scattered across in a wide area, including Shinano, Shimōsa, and Mino Provinces, in addition to various areas in the Kinai region such as Harima, Settsu, and Kii Province.

However, when the Kenmu restoration collapsed and the Muromachi Shogunate was established, Daitoku-ji, which had close ties to Emperor Go-Daigo, was looked down upon by the Ashikaga Shogunate and demoted from the Five Mountains system. In 1386, it was ranked ninth, near the bottom of the Jissetsu temples. For this reason, in 1432, the 26th abbot, Yoso Soi, left the Five Mountain System and declared Daitoku-ji an independent temple, outside of the increasingly politicized Rinzai school hierarchy. Daitoku-ji flourished thereafter, receiving protection and support from a wide range of people, including aristocrats, feudal lords, merchants, and intellectuals, and from the Muromachi period onwards, it produced many famous monks.

Like many other temples in Kyoto during that time, the temple was repeatedly destroyed by fire. In 1474, which was when Kyoto devastated by the Ōnin War, Emperor Go-Tsuchimikado designated Ikkyū Sōjun as the head priest. With the help of merchants of the city of Sakai, Ikkyū contributed significantly to the temple's rehabilitation. Ikkyū was visited by people who were leaders of Higashiyama culture, such as Murata Juko, founder of the wabi-cha style of the Japanese tea ceremony, Daitoku-ji developed deep ties to the world of tea ceremony, and many tea masters, including Takeno Jōō, Sen no Rikyū, and Kobori Enshū, have had connections with Daitoku-ji. In addition, many chashitsu designated as Important Cultural Properties remain on the grounds of the temple and its sub-temples.

After Oda Nobunaga died during the Honnō-ji Incident, Toyotomi Hideyoshi held a lavish funeral for Nobunaga at this temple in 1582 and built a sub-temple, Sōken-in., as Nobunaga's bodaiji. This practice continued into the sixteenth century, when Daitoku-ji was predominantly supported by members of the military establishment, who sponsored the building of subsidiary temples as prayers for their ancestors or in preparation for their own demise. Around this time, the temple became strongly associated with Sen no Rikyū, and his reconstruction of the temple's Sanmon led to his loss of favor with Hideyoshi.

In the early Edo period, the temple was under the control of the Tokugawa shogunate, and the former chief priest, high priest Takuan Sōhō, was exiled due to the Purple Robe Incident, but relations with the Shogunate were later restored, partly because the third Shogun, Tokugawa Iemitsu, became a follower of Takuan. In the Edo period, the temple flourished with over 280 branch temples in 25 provinces and over 130 sub-temples. However, due its close ties with the shogunate, the temple was hit particularly hard by the Meiji restoration, when much of its economic foundation was confiscated by the Meiji government. However, the temple managed to survive on a somewhat smaller scale to this day.

== Buildings and layout ==
The Imperial Envoy Gate, Sanmon, Butsuden, and Lecture Hall are lined up in a nearly straight line, and to the north, south, and west of these central buildings are more than 20 tatchū sub-temples.

Butsuden (Important Cultural Property)

The main hall of this temple, this structure was rebuilt in 1665 with a donation from Nawa Joyu, a wealthy Kyoto merchant. It enshrines the honzon Shaka Nyōrai, which is said to be a 1/10-size prototype of the Hōkō-ji Great Buddha (Kyoto Daibutsu). The wall paintings were done by Kaihō Yūshō. The ceiling painting is a flying celestial figure by Kanō Motonobu, and was reused from the previous Buddha Hall, which was rebuilt in 1479 with a donation from the wealthy Sakai merchant Owa Sōrin.

Hatto (Important Cultural Property)

This structure was rebuilt in 1636 by Inaba Masakatsu, the daimyō of Odawara Domain. The painting of the Cloud Dragon on the ceiling was done by Kanō Tan'yu when he was 35 years old.

Kyōzō Sutra repository (Important Cultural Property)

This structure was built in 1636 by Nawa Sotan.

Shōrō Bell tower (Important Cultural Property)

This structure was rebuilt in 1583.

Honbō (Main Temple of Religious Affairs)

This is a complex of structure. It contains:

- Kuri rectory (Important Cultural Property) - This structure was rebuilt around 1636, using old materials from the former Hōjō (abbot's chamber).
- Tea hall (Important Cultural Property) - Built in 1630 by Masuda Motoyoshi, a chief retainer of the Chōshū Domain.
- Corridor (Important Cultural Property)
- Hōjō (Abbot's chamber) (National Treasure) - Rebuilt in 1635, this building is in a Japanese style, different from the lecture hall and Butsuden, which are Zen Buddhist architecture. The Hōjō is 29.8 meters high at the front and 17.0 meters high at the sides, has a gabled roof and is covered with shingles (originally hinoki cypress bark). It was built to commemorate the 300th anniversary of the death of the founder, Shūhō Myōchō. The Hōjō was originally the residence of the chief priest, but later the abbot's living room was moved to a separate location and became a space used for entertaining imperial envoys and shogunate officials and for religious events. Most Hōjō buildings have a plan format with a total of six rooms arranged in two rows from front to back and three rows from left to right, but the Daitoku-ji Hōjō has a unique layout with a total of eight rooms arranged in two rows from front to back and four rows from left to right; and the two rooms in the second row from the right are the sub-temple Unmon-an, with Shūhō Myōchō's tomb. Part of Unmon-an protrudes north beyond the veranda on the north side of the Hōjō. The 84 paintings on the partitions in the abbot's chamber were created by Kanō Tan'yū.
- Entrance (National Treasure) - Built in 1636 with a donation from wealthy merchant Goto Masukatsu. It has six bays across, one beam, and is single-story, with a karahafu-style roof and shingled shingle roof. It is located to the north of the central temple complex, in a corner surrounded by earthen walls.
- Southern Garden of the Abbot's Chamber (National Historic Site and Special Place of Scenic Beauty) - A Japanese dry garden created by Priest Tenyu.
- Karamon (National Treasure) - A four-legged gate from the early modern period. Gabled, with a cypress bark roof. Along with the Karamon gates of Nishi Hongan-ji and Toyokuni Shrine, it is known as one of the "Three Karamon Gates of the Momoyama Period." It is located to the north of the central temple complex, which includes the Buddha hall and lecture hall, and is connected to the earthen wall to the south of the abbot's chamber. In the past, there was a gate called Akechimon, built with silver donated by Akechi Mitsuhide immediately after the Honnoji Incident, at the site of Karamon. However, in 1886, the Akechimon was sold to Konchi-in a sub-temple of Nanzen-ji and the current Karamon, which was said to have come from the Jurakudai Palace was moved to the front of the Daitoku-ji Hōjō. The other name, "Higurashimon", comes from the legend that one forgets the sun setting when looking at this gate, and it is said that the name "Higurashi-dori" that remains at the former site of Jurakudai is derived from this gate.
- Samurai Shinryo (Important Cultural Property) - Built in the late Muromachi period.

Sanmon (Important Cultural Property)

This two-story gate known as "Kinmokaku". The lower level was completed in 1529 with a donation from the renga poet Sōchō, and the upper level by Sen no Rikyū in 1589. Out of gratitude for completion of the gate, Myotoku-ji placed a wooden statue of Rikyū wearing sandals on the upper level. Because of this, anyone passing through the gate would have to walk under Rikyū's feet, which is said to so outraged Toyotomi Hideyoshi that it led to Rikyū's seppuku.

Chokkumon Gate (Important Cultural Property)

Also known as the "Imperial Envoy's gate", this gate was built during the Keichō era (1596-1614) and was bestowed by Emperor Gomizunoo as a gift from the Imperial Palace, and was moved to its current location in 1640.

Bathhouse (Important Cultural Property)

This structure was rebuilt in 1622 with a donation from Haiya Joyu, a Kyoto townsman.

== Sub-temples ==
Daitoku-ji operates some twenty-two sub-temples, the most significant being Daisen-in, Jukō-in (聚光院), and Shinjū-an (眞珠庵).

- Daiji-in (大慈院)
- Daikō-in (大光院)
- Daisen-in (大仙院)
- Daiyō-an (大用庵)
- Gyokurin-in (玉林院)
- Hōshun-in (芳春院)
- Jukō-in (聚光院)
- Kinryū-in (金龍院)
- Kōrin-in (興臨院)
- Kōtō-in (高桐院)
- Nyoi-an (如意庵)
- Ōbai-in (黄梅院)
- Ryōgen-in (龍源院)
- Ryōkō-in (龍光院)
- Sangen-in (三玄院)
- Shinju-an (真珠庵)
- Shōgen-in (松源院)
- Shōju-in (正受院)
- Shōrin-in (昌林院)
- Sōken-in (総見院)
- Tenzui-ji (天瑞寺)
- Tokuzen-ji (徳禅寺)
- Yōtoku-in (養徳院)
- Zuihō-in (瑞峯院)

== Shichidō garan ==
The garan (compound):

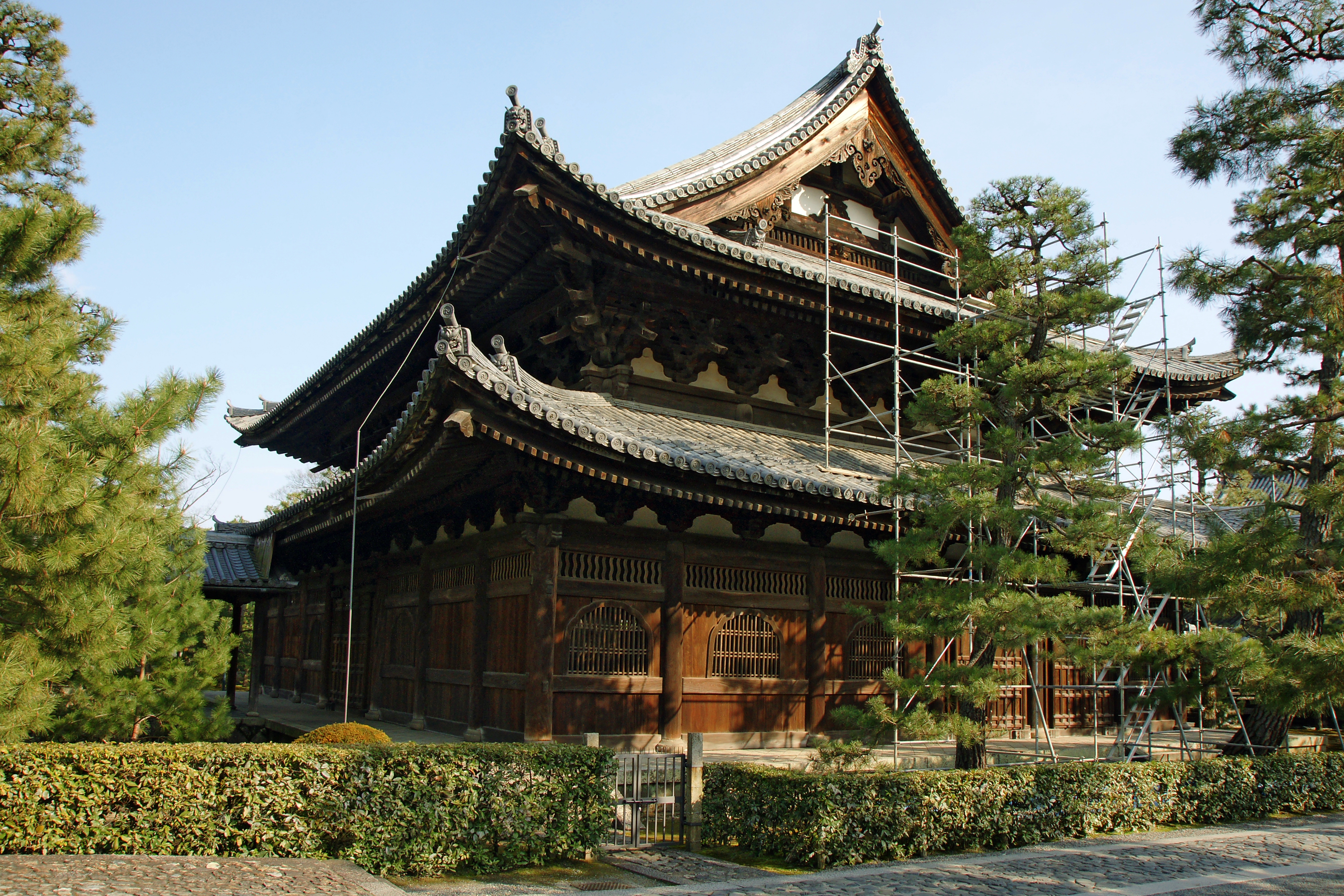
Hattō

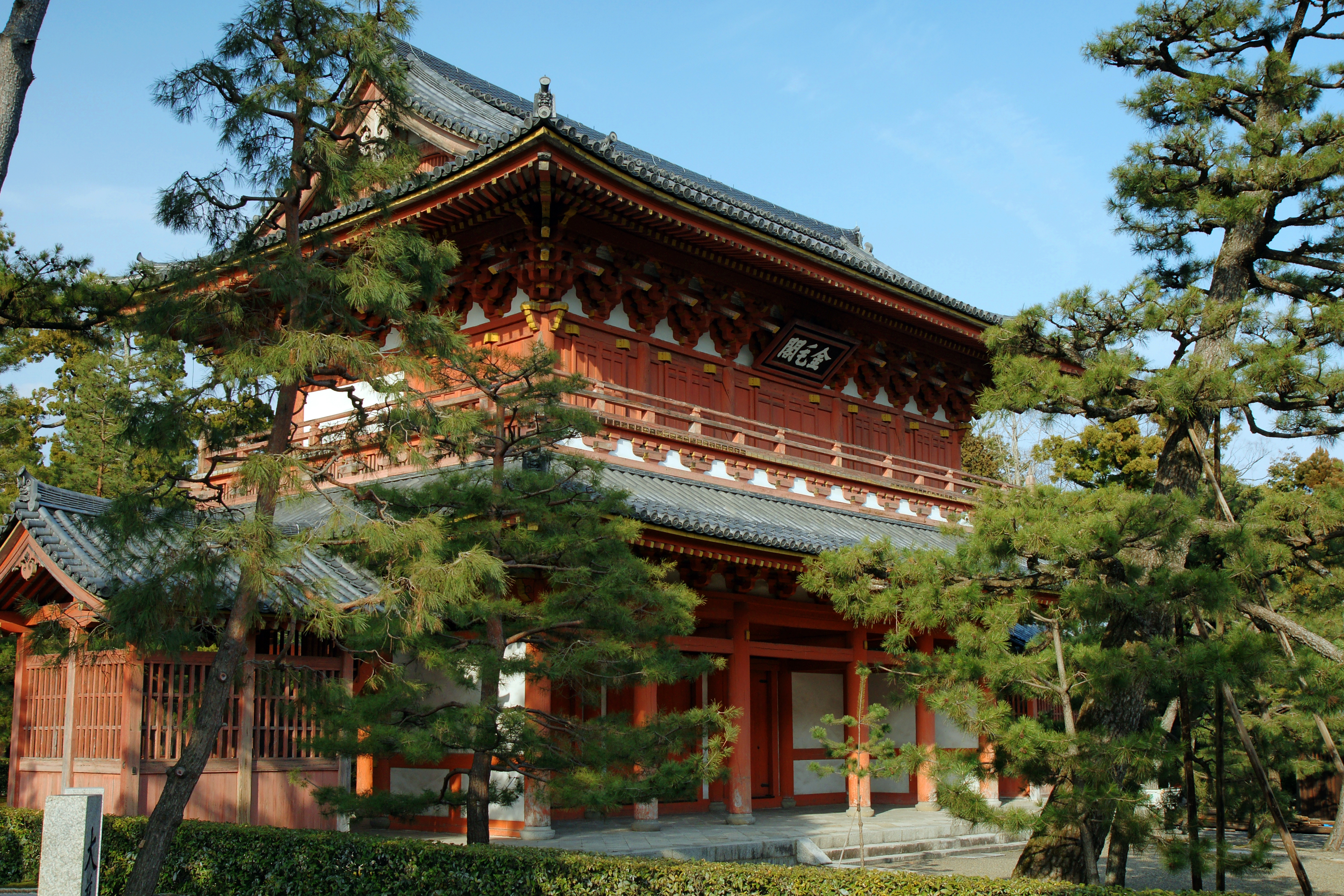
Sanmon

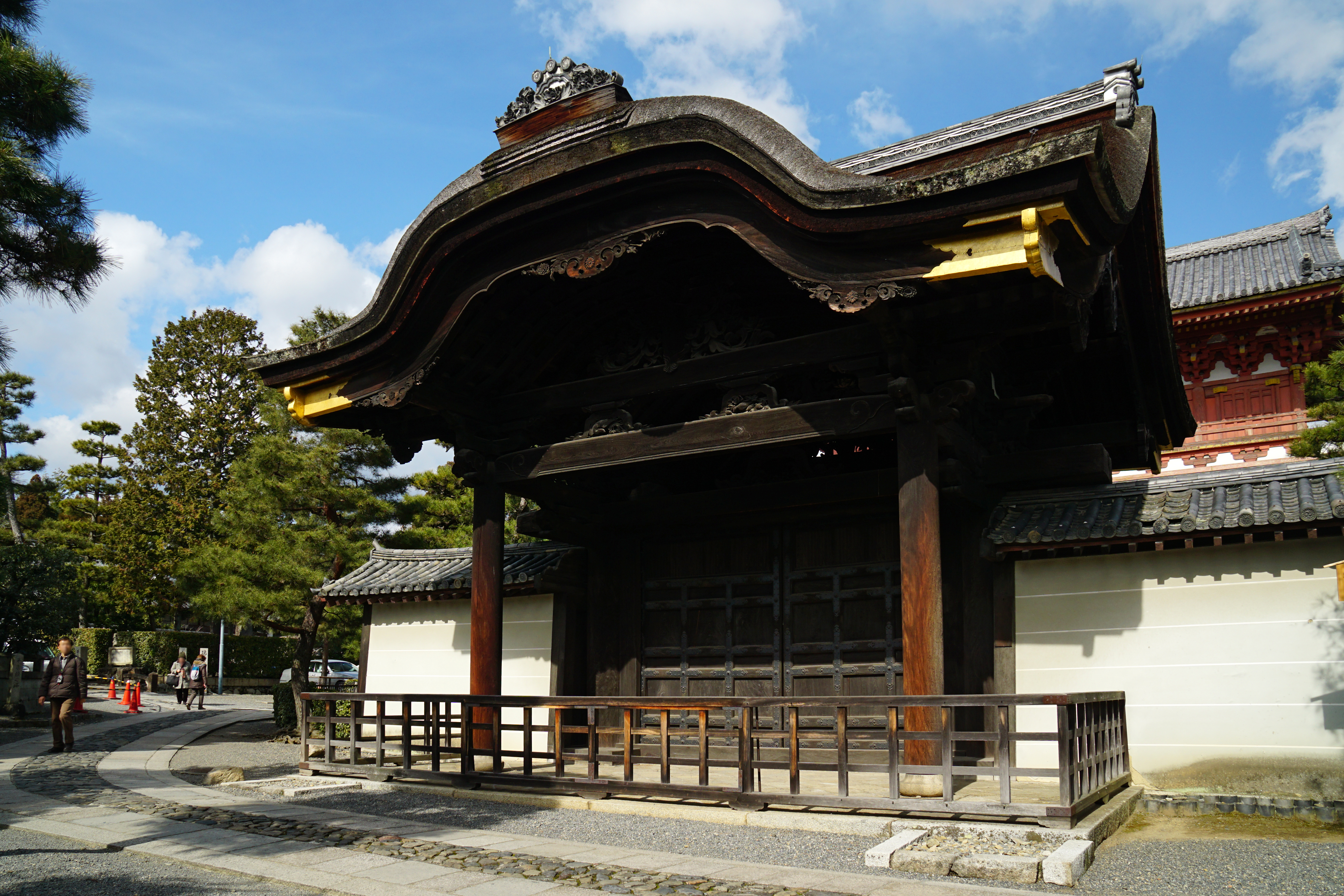
Imperial emissary gate (Chokushi-mon)

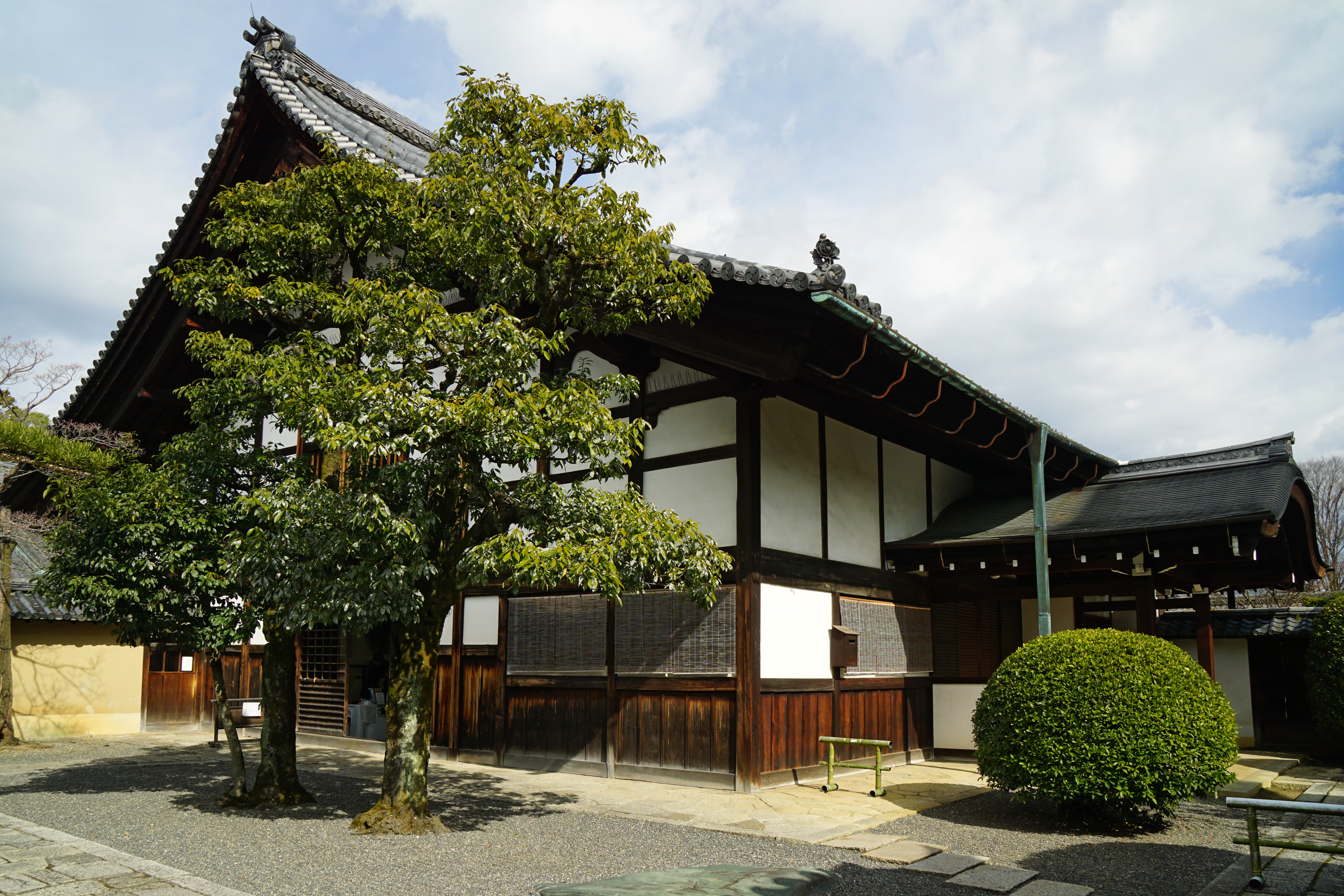
Hondō

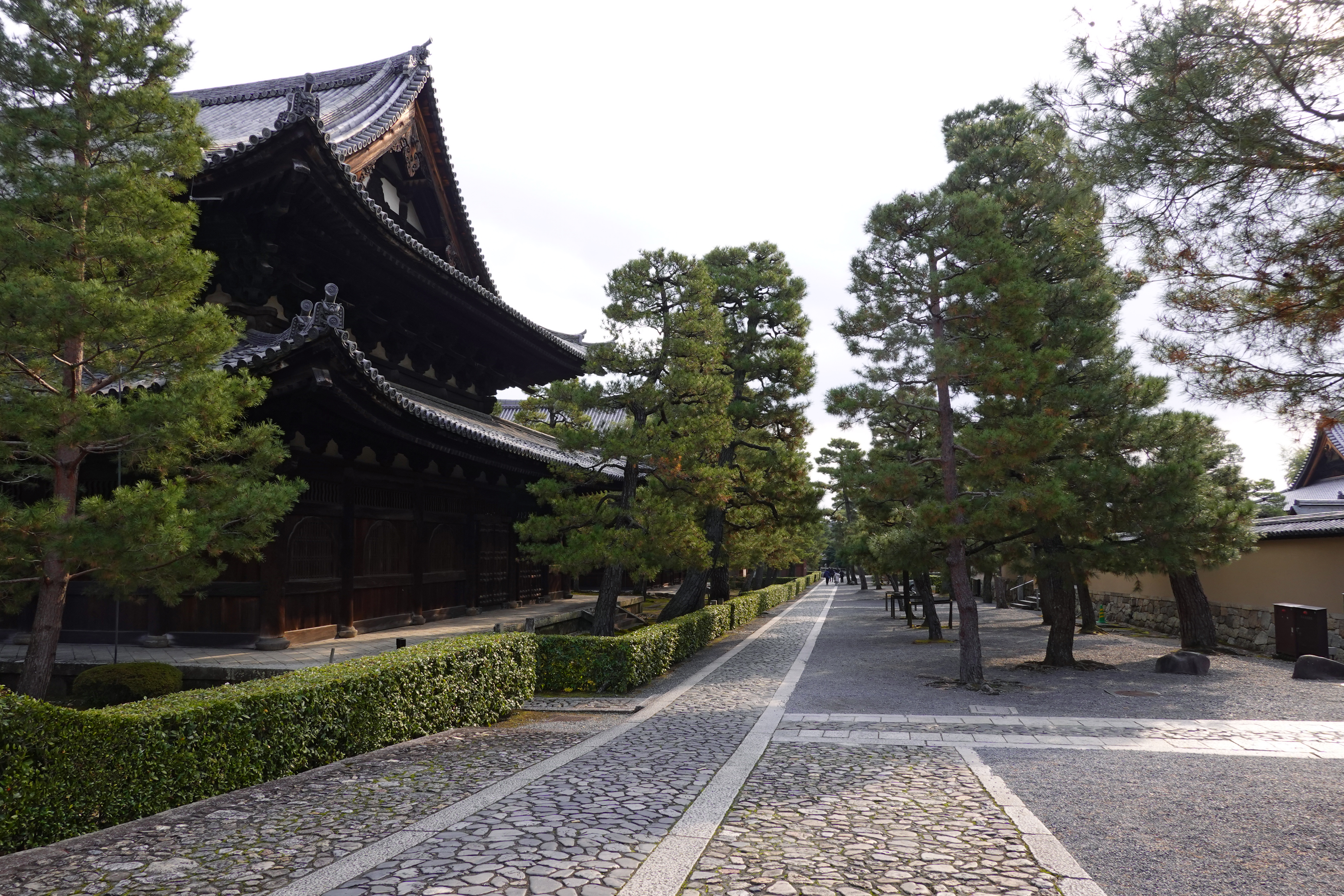
Main alley way

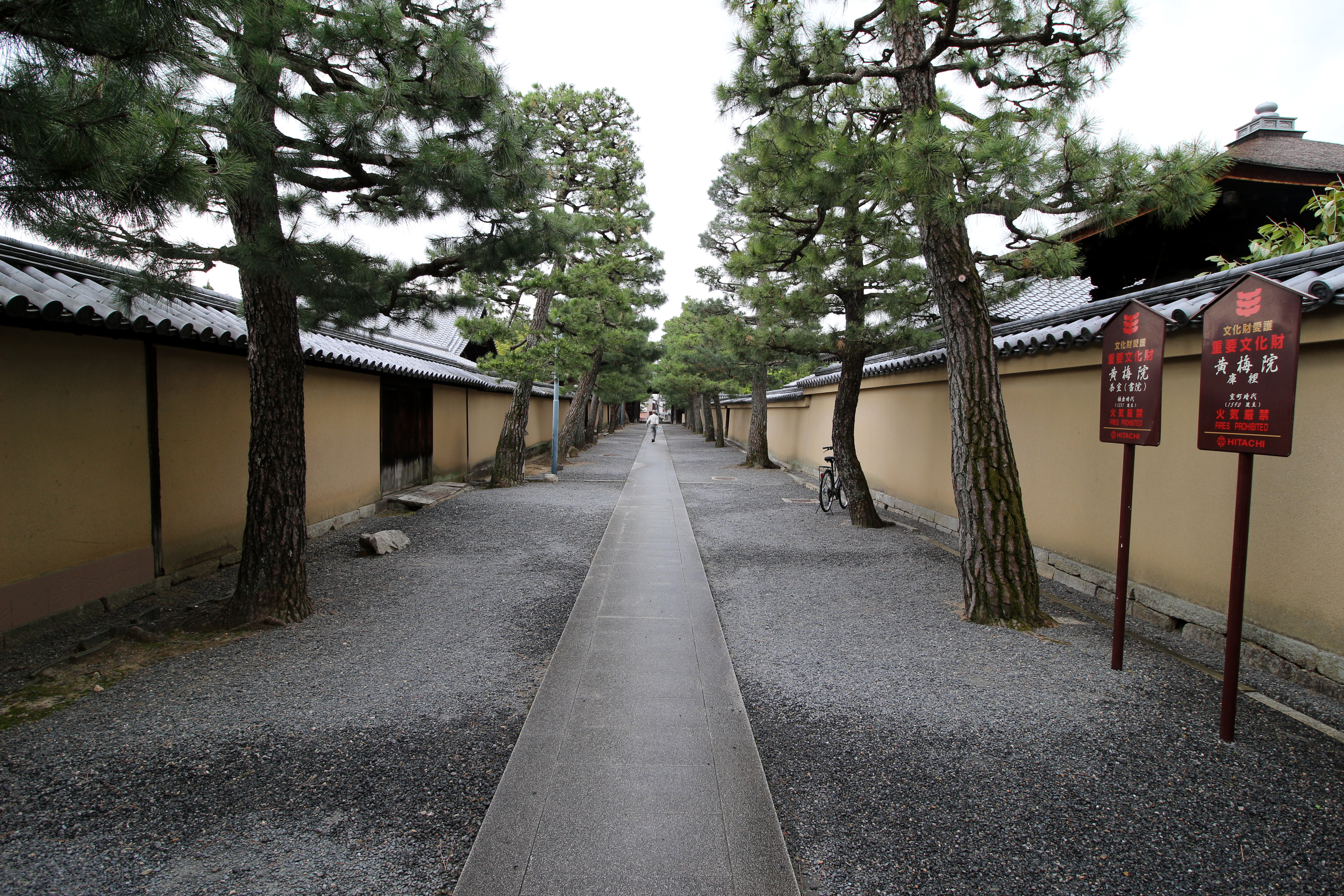
Main alley way

== Tatchū ==
The tatchū (塔中; inner cloisters):

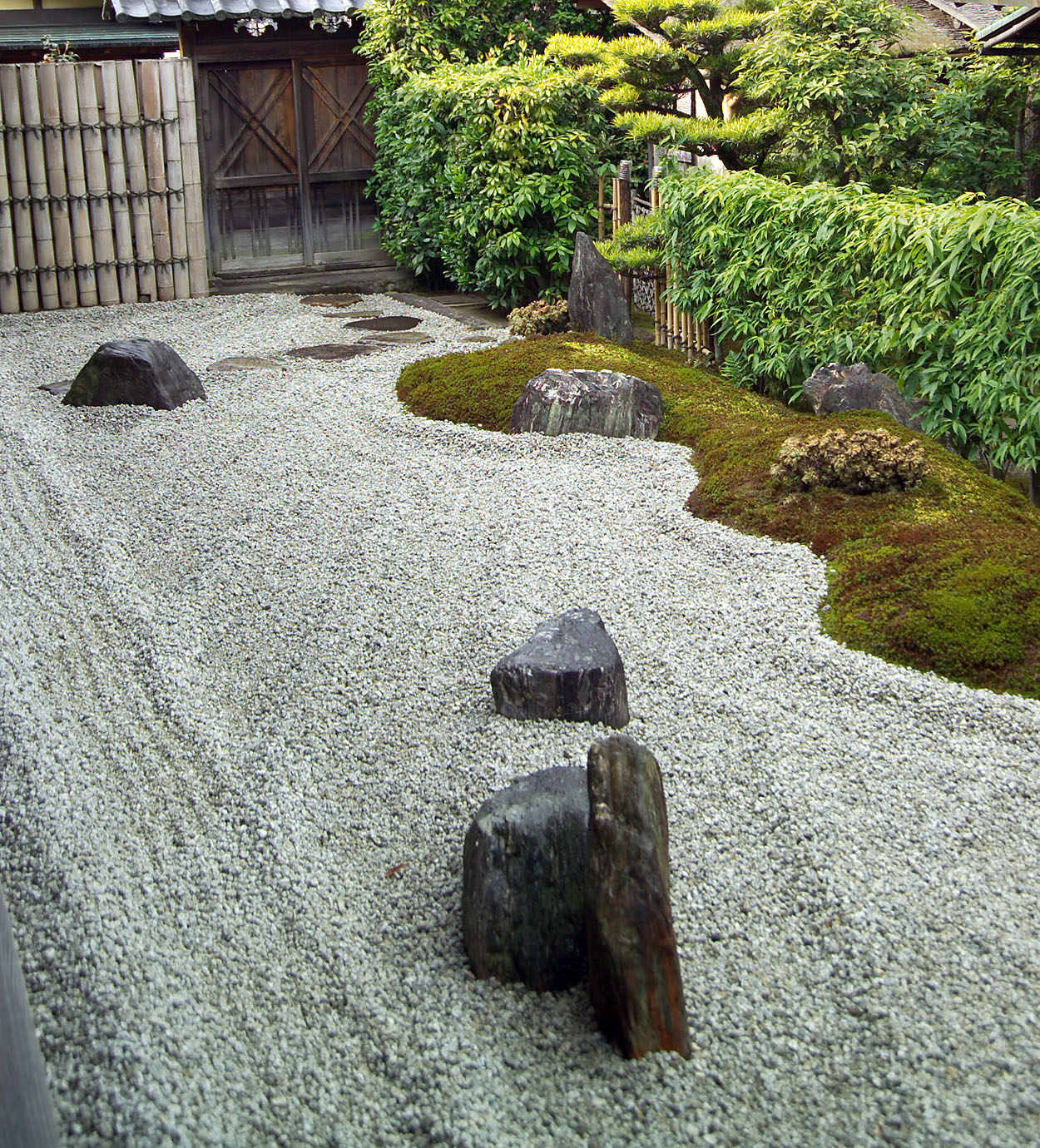
Garden of the Cross at Zuihō-in

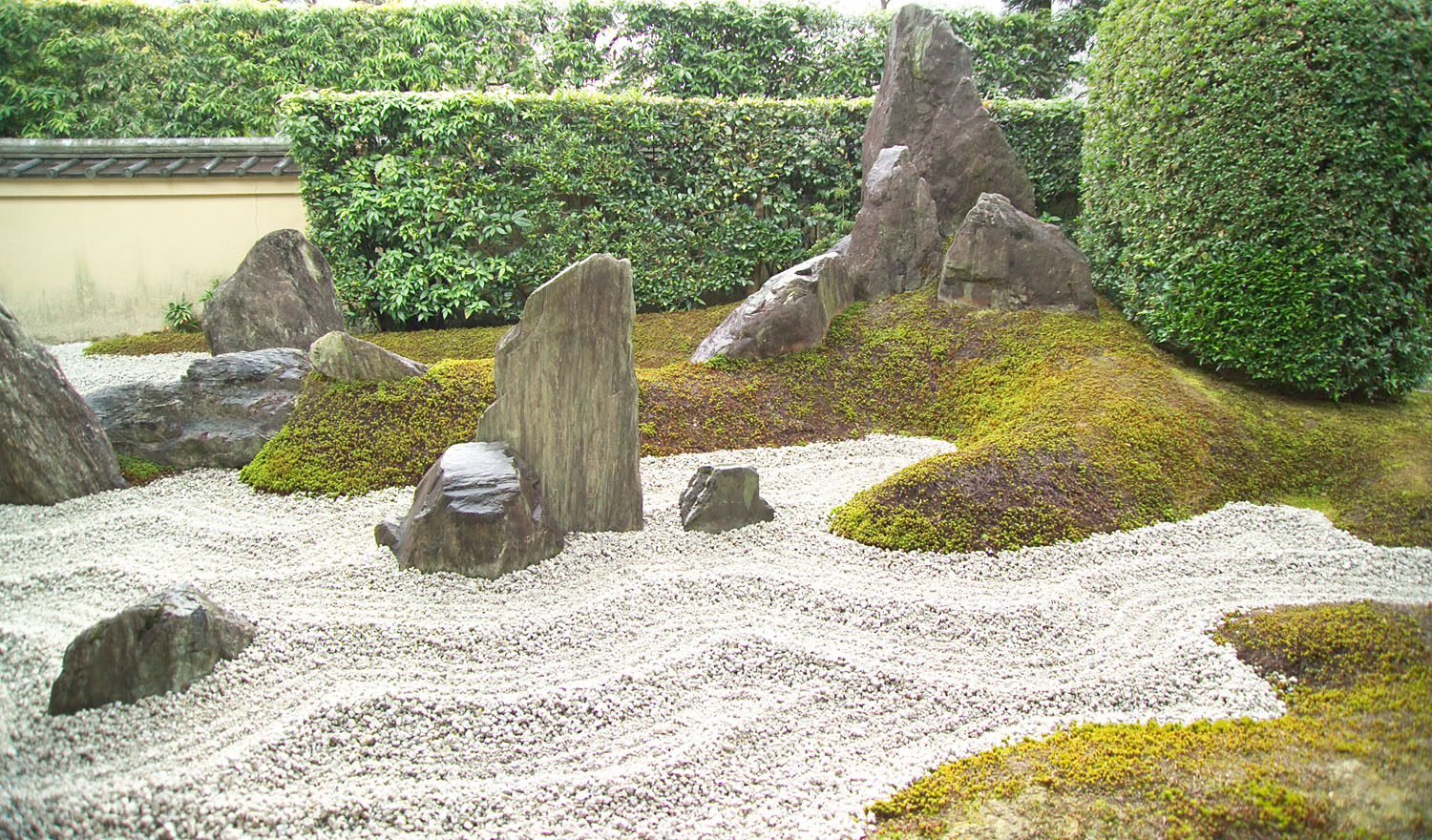
Dokuza-tei (The Garden of Solitary Sitting), a garden at Zuiho-in

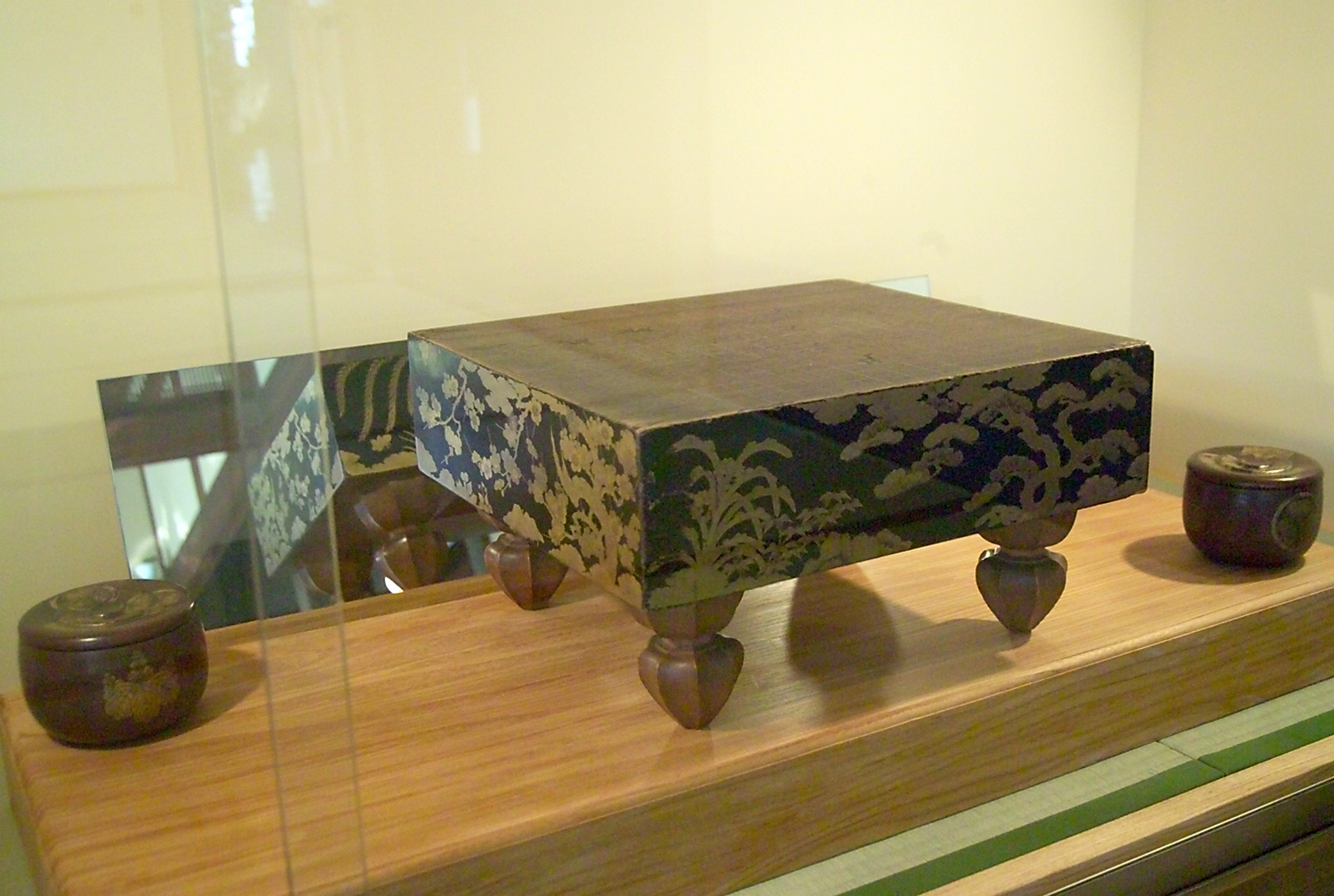
Go board used by Toyotomi Hideyoshi and Tokugawa Ieyasu at Ryogen-in, Daitoku-ji

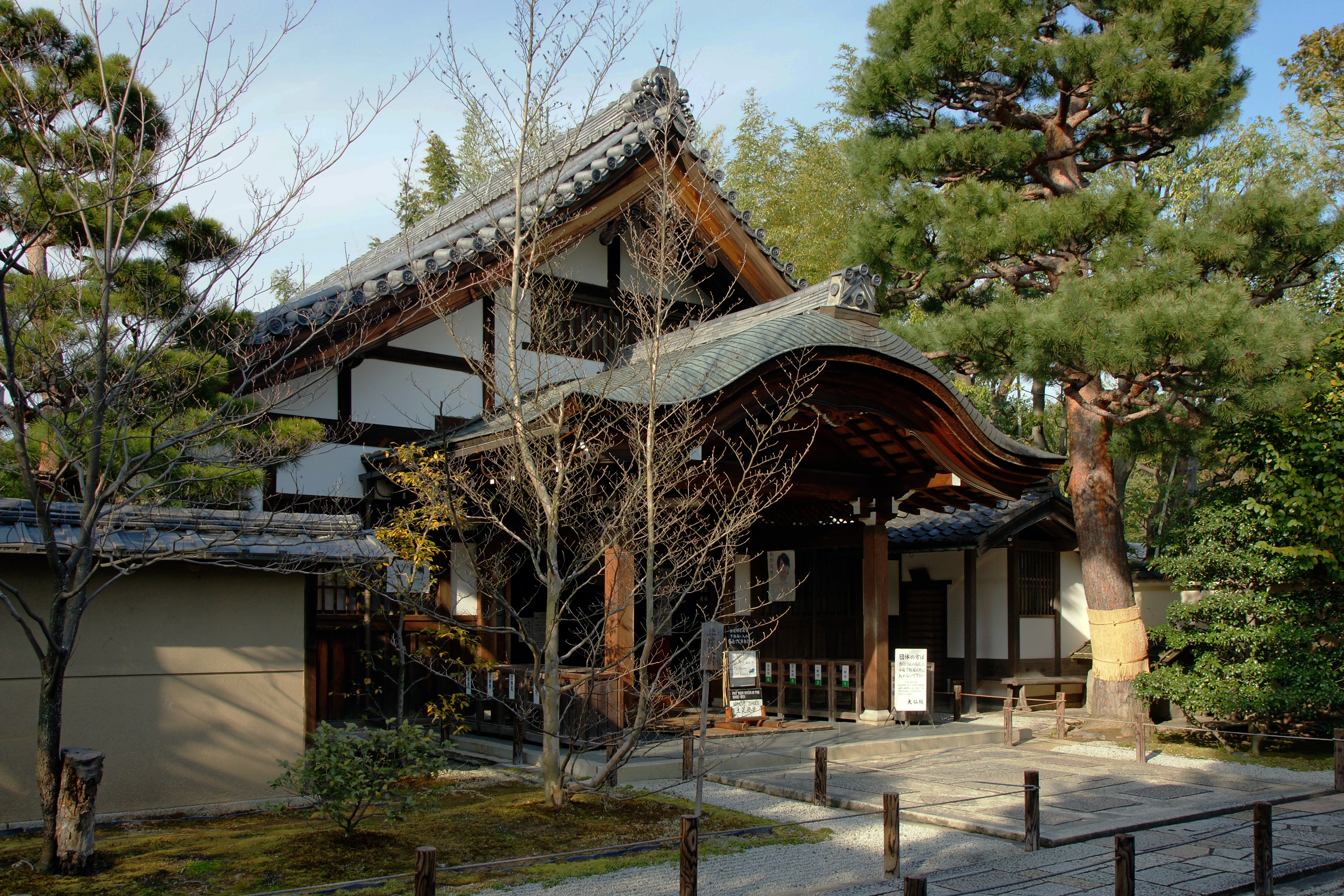
Daisen-in

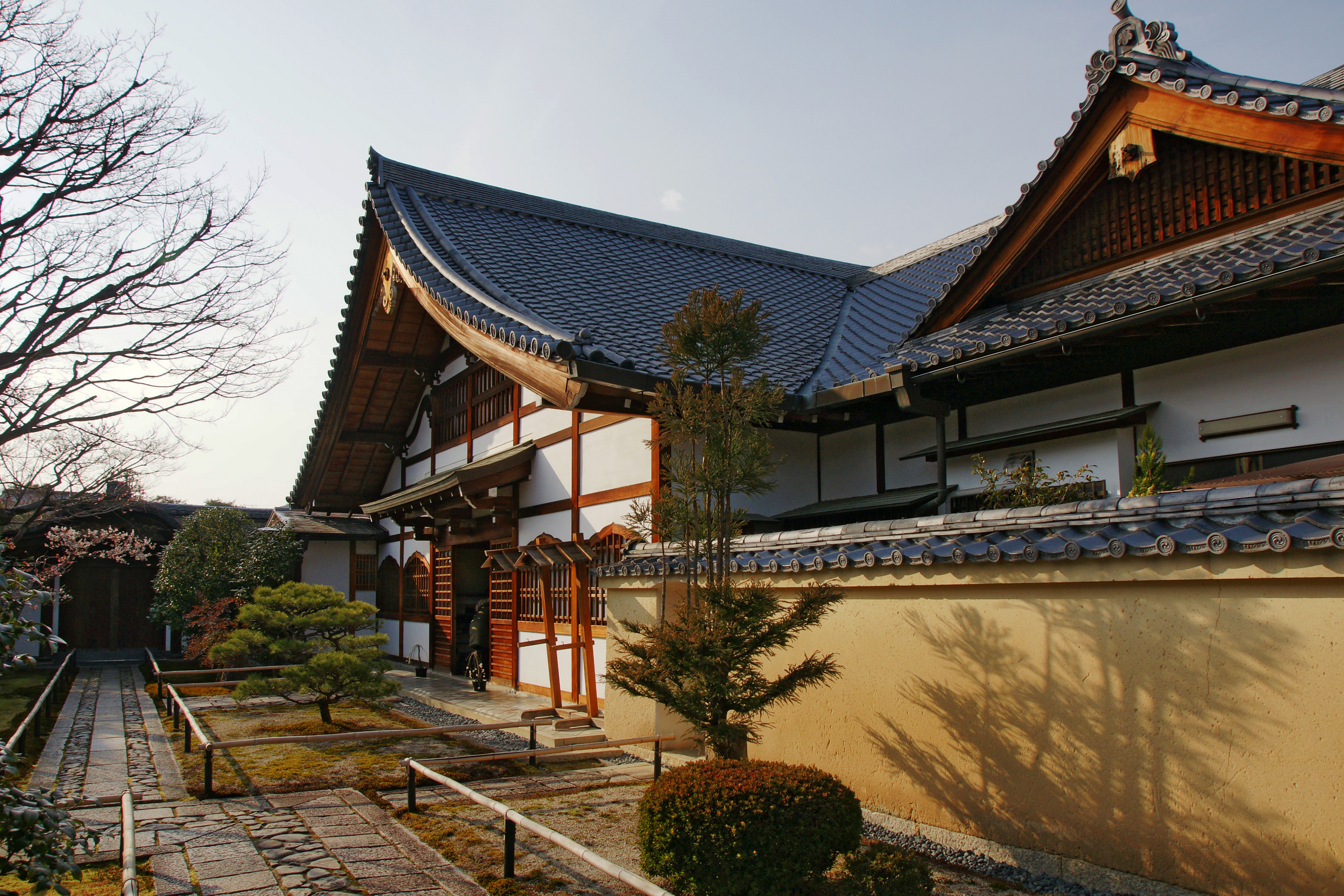
Kōrin-in

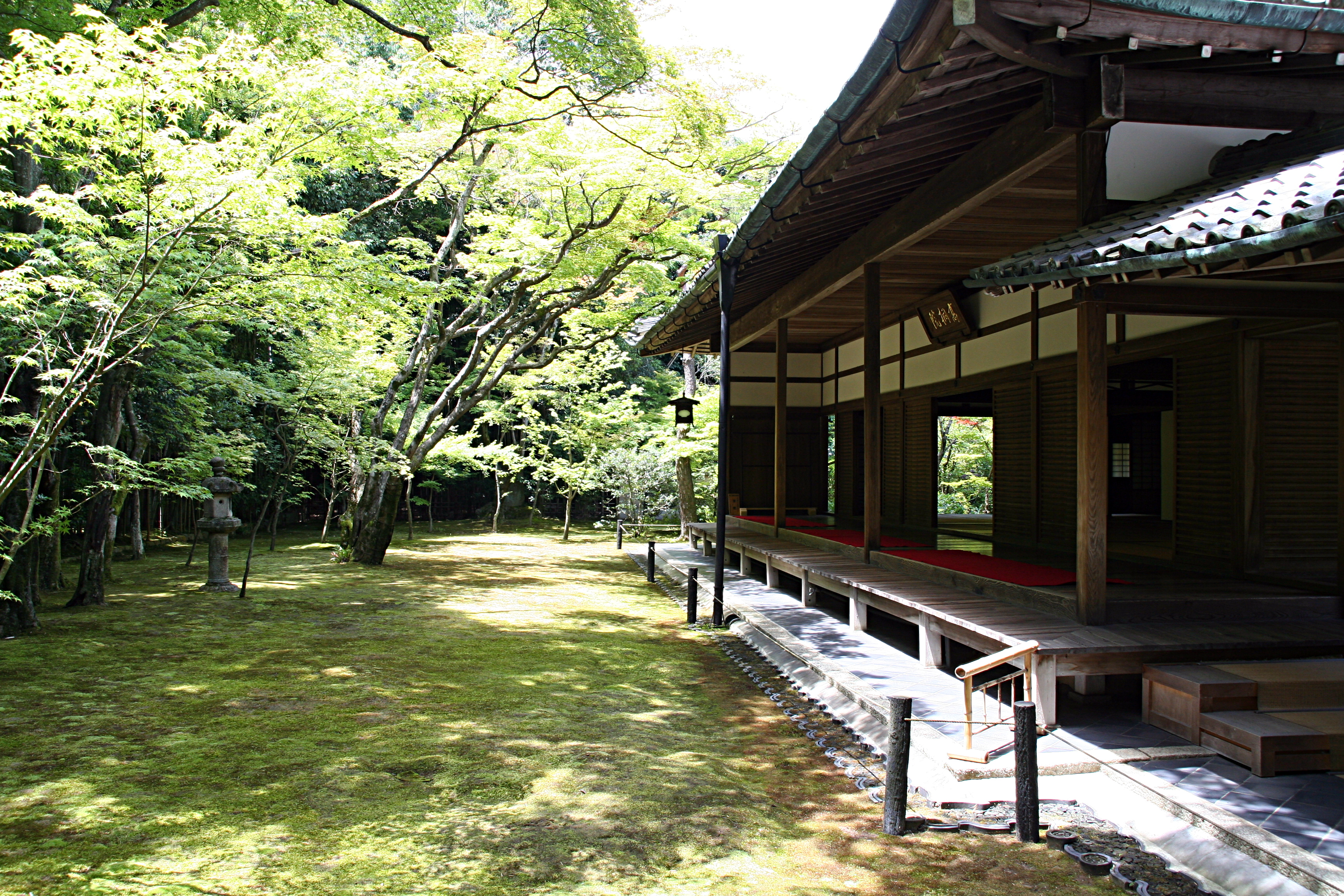
Kotō-in

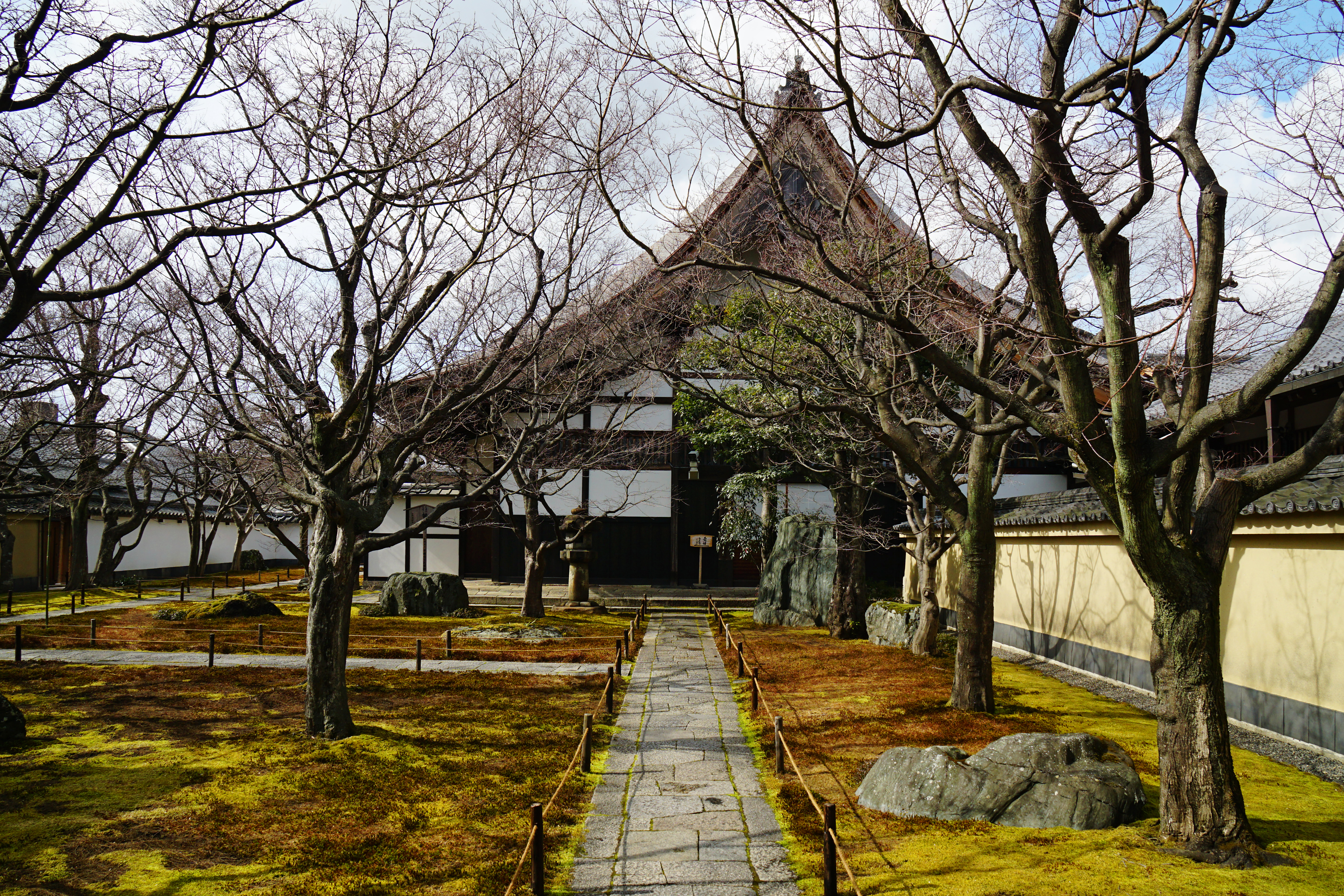
Ōbai-in

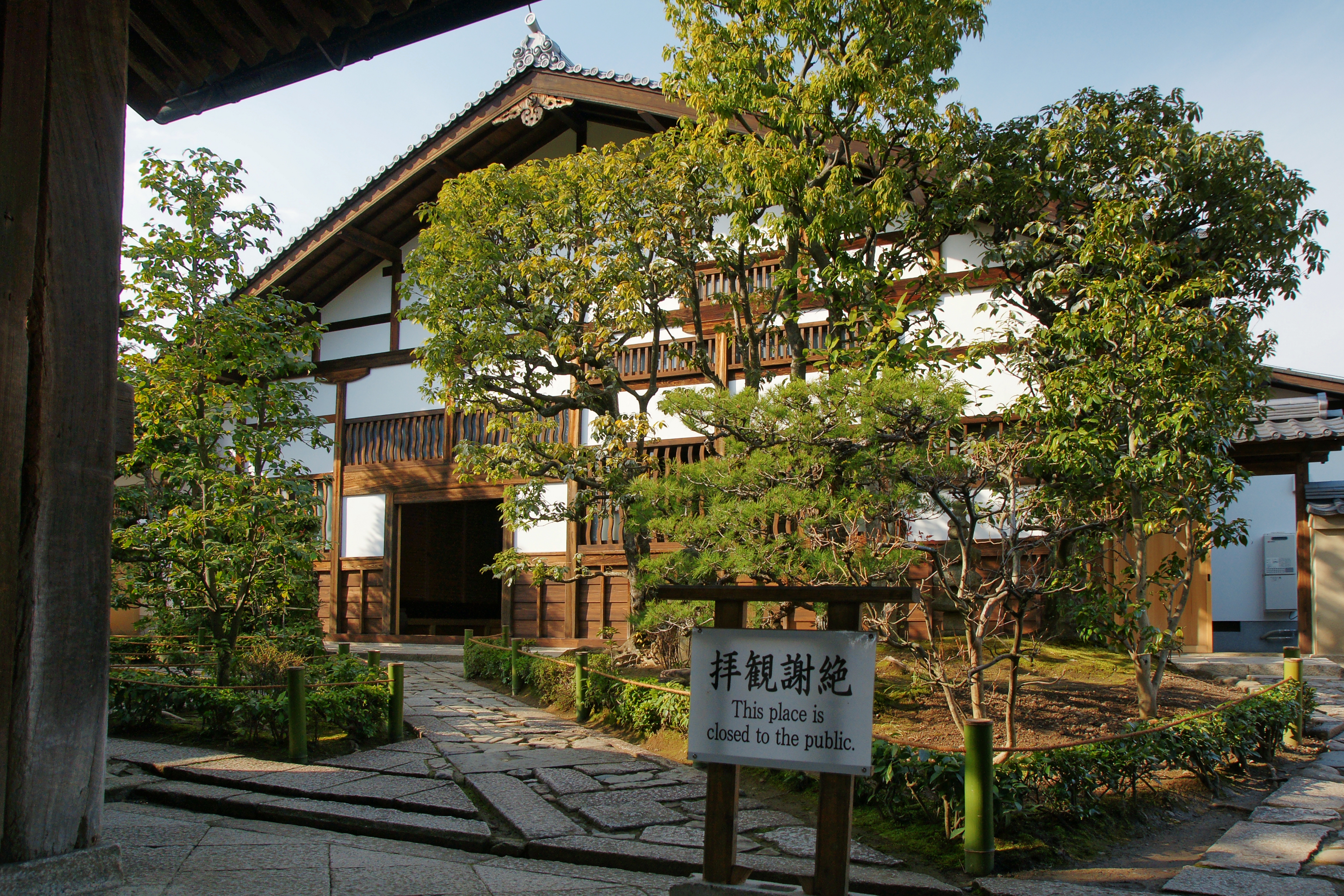
Jukō-in

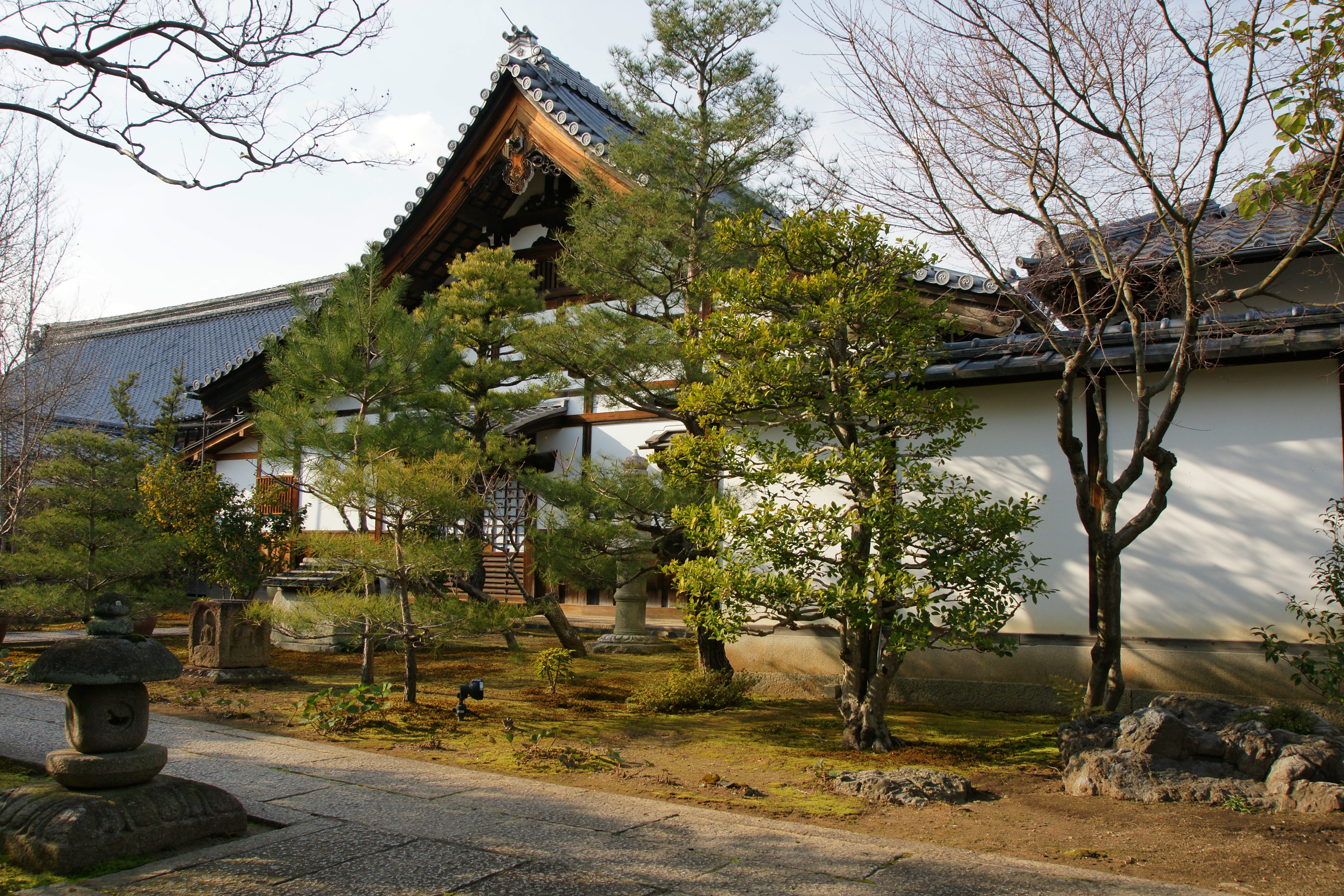
Hōshun-in

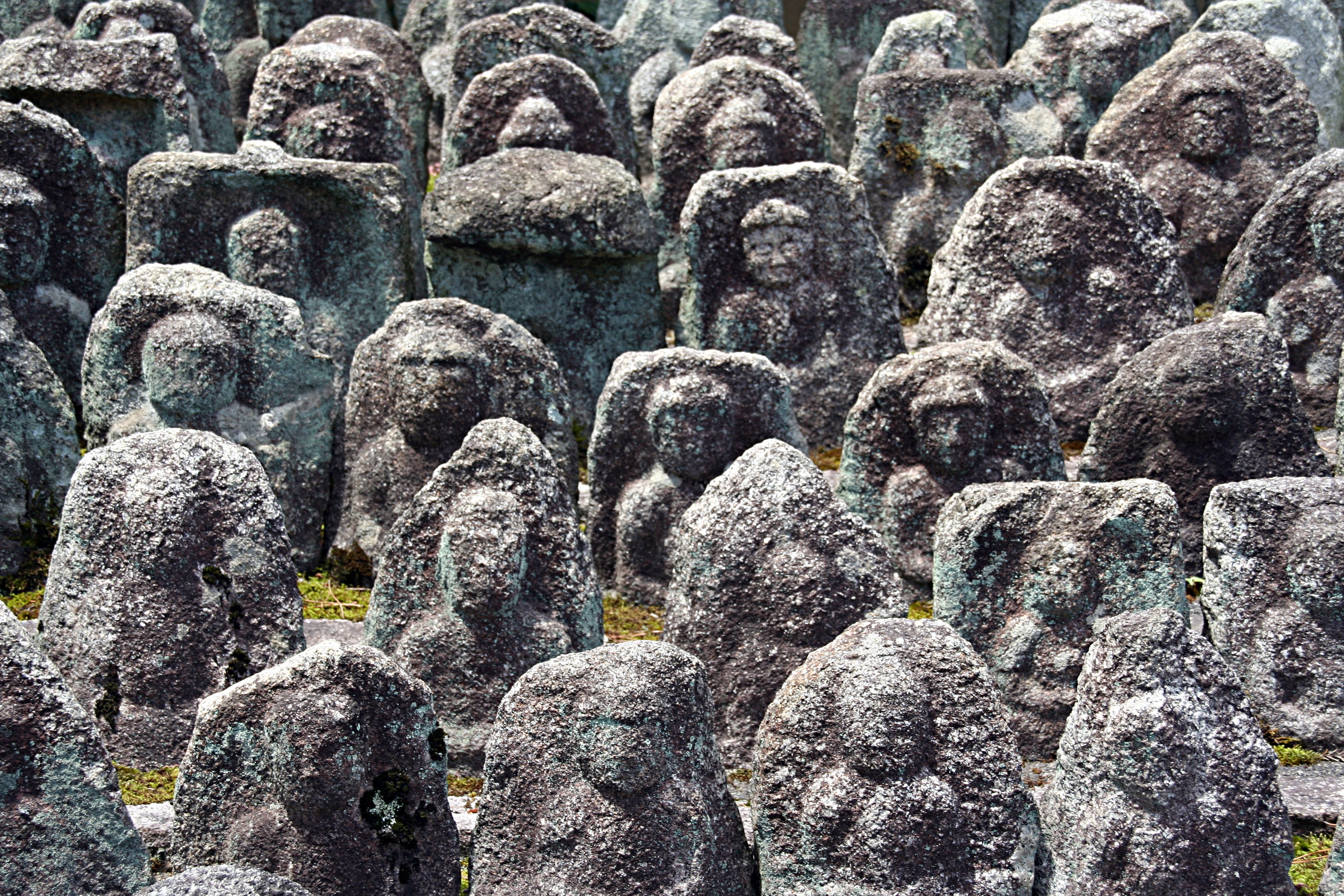

== See also ==
- Goto Zuigan
- Kobori Nanrei Sohaku
- List of National Treasures of Japan (residences)
- List of National Treasures of Japan (temples)
- List of National Treasures of Japan (ancient documents)
- List of National Treasures of Japan (paintings)
- List of National Treasures of Japan (writings)
