= Sheng'an Shixian =

Chinese Buddhist Pure Land monk

Shíxián (省庵實賢; 1686–1734; courtesy name Sīqí) was a Chinese Buddhist monk of the Pure Land tradition. Shíxián, also known as Xǐng ān and Sheng'an, was an eminent Buddhist monk of the Qing dynasty and is recognized as the eleventh patriarch of the Chinese Pure Land School.

== Overview ==
A native of Chángshú, Jiāngsū province, Shíxián was born into a literati family and was well educated in the Confucian style before converting to Buddhism and becoming a monk at fifteen at Qingliang Monastery. He spent much of his life at Fàntiān Monastery in Hángzhōu, as such he was commonly known as "Fàntiān". As a monk he studied Yogacara, the Śūraṅgama Sūtra, and the Mohe Zhiguan under a master Shàotán, who transmitted him the Lingfeng Tiantai lineage.

Under Master Lingjiu at Chongfu Temple, Shíxián also practiced Chan by contemplating the huatou "Who is it that recites the Buddha's name?" He then underwent a three year retreat at Zhēnjì Monastery where he practiced nianfo and studied the scriptures. He also visited King Aśoka’s (Yùwáng) Relic Stupa at Mount Ashoka in Siming, where he burned his fingers before the Buddha as an offering, made forty-eight vows, and gave lectures on Buddhism.

In his later years, he devoted himself to Pure Land practice while residing at Xiānlín Monastery in Hángzhōu. He kept the Vinaya precepts strictly, wrote several works on Pure Land Buddhism and established a Pure Land Lotus Society.

Shíxián was influenced by teachings of Yunqi Zhuhong (1535–1615), and taught that the practice of reciting Amitabha Buddha's name (nianfo) ought to be combined with the Buddhist ethical precepts. He thus taught by the motto: "Practice guided by the Brahma Net Sutra, aspiration directed to the Western Pure Land." As such he taught the fortnightly recitation of the Bodhisattva Precepts along with extensive nianfo practice. He also lectured regularly on Mahayana sutras, especially the Lotus Sutra, and Shurangama Sutra."

He passed away in 1733 after a period of solitary retreat in which he claimed to have had a vision of Amitabha and the Pure Land sages. He was forty nine.

== Works ==
His works include:

- Poems on the Pure Land (108 poems),
- Commentary on the Aspiration for Rebirth in the Western Pure Land (1 fascicle)
- Continued Biographies of Those Reborn in the Pure Land (1 fascicle)
- The Nirvāṇa Repentance,
- An Essay Exhorting the Resolution to Attain Awakening (1 fascicle).
- Recorded Sayings of Dharma Master Xǐng'ān

== See also ==
- Ouyi Zhixu
- Yunqi Zhuhong
- Youxi Chuandeng
