= Four Eminent Monks of the Wanli Era =

Four prominent Chinese monks of the Wanli Era

The Four Eminent Monks of the Wanli Era (traditional Chinese: 萬曆四高僧; pinyin: Wànlì Sì Gāosēng; Wade–Giles: Wan-li Ssu Kao-seng) or “four great eminent monks of the late Ming period" (明末四大高僧) refers to four prominent monks known of the Wanli Era (1573–1620). They were well known for their ecumenism, arguing for the compatibility of Buddhism, Confucianism, and Daoism, but emphasising the superiority of Buddhism over the latter two.

The four monks were:

1. Hanshan Deqing (憨山德清; 1546–1623)
2. Zibo Zhenke (達觀真可; 1543–1603)
3. Yunqi Zhuhong (雲棲株宏;1535–1615)
4. Ouyi Zhixu (蕅益智旭; 1599–1655)

According to Jiang Wu, the Four Eminent Monks of the Wanli era "set their minds on scholasticism and meditation without interest in expanding their influence on monastic institutions," and thus, their influence did not largely extend into the Qing Dynasty (1644–1912). In contrast, the monastics of the transitional period between the Ming and Qing attempted to reintroduce the classical Chan techniques of "beating and shouting" and "unreasonable emphasis on the strictness of dharma transmission," which Wu suggests was a surface narrative underlying the facade of strong institutionalisation and lineage building by monks such as Miyun Yuanwu, Feiyin Tongrong, and Muchen Daomin.
