= Amitābha Sūtra =

Popular Sutra in Mahāyāna Buddhism

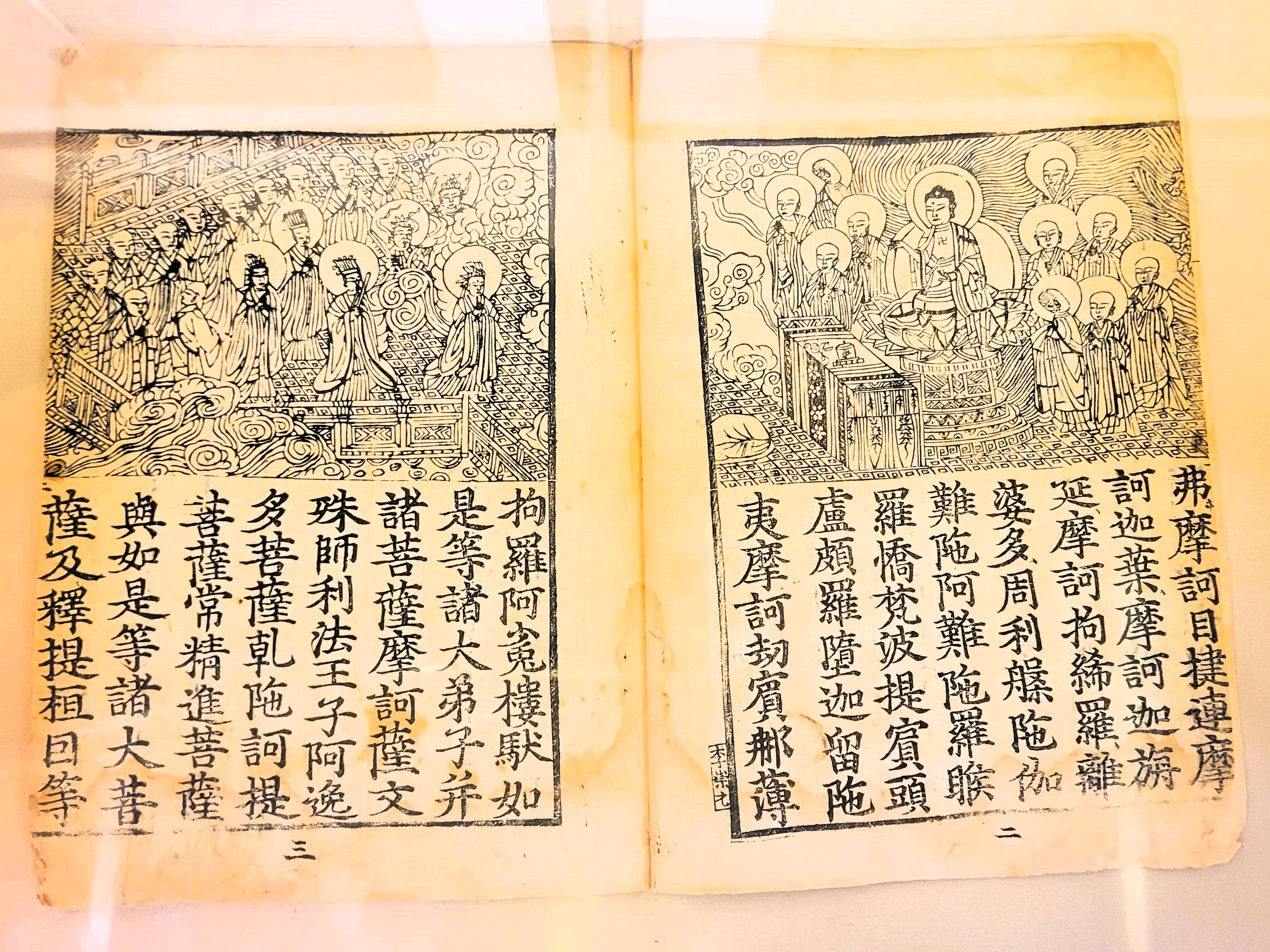
Illustrated Amitabha Sutra, Korea, Deokjusa Temple

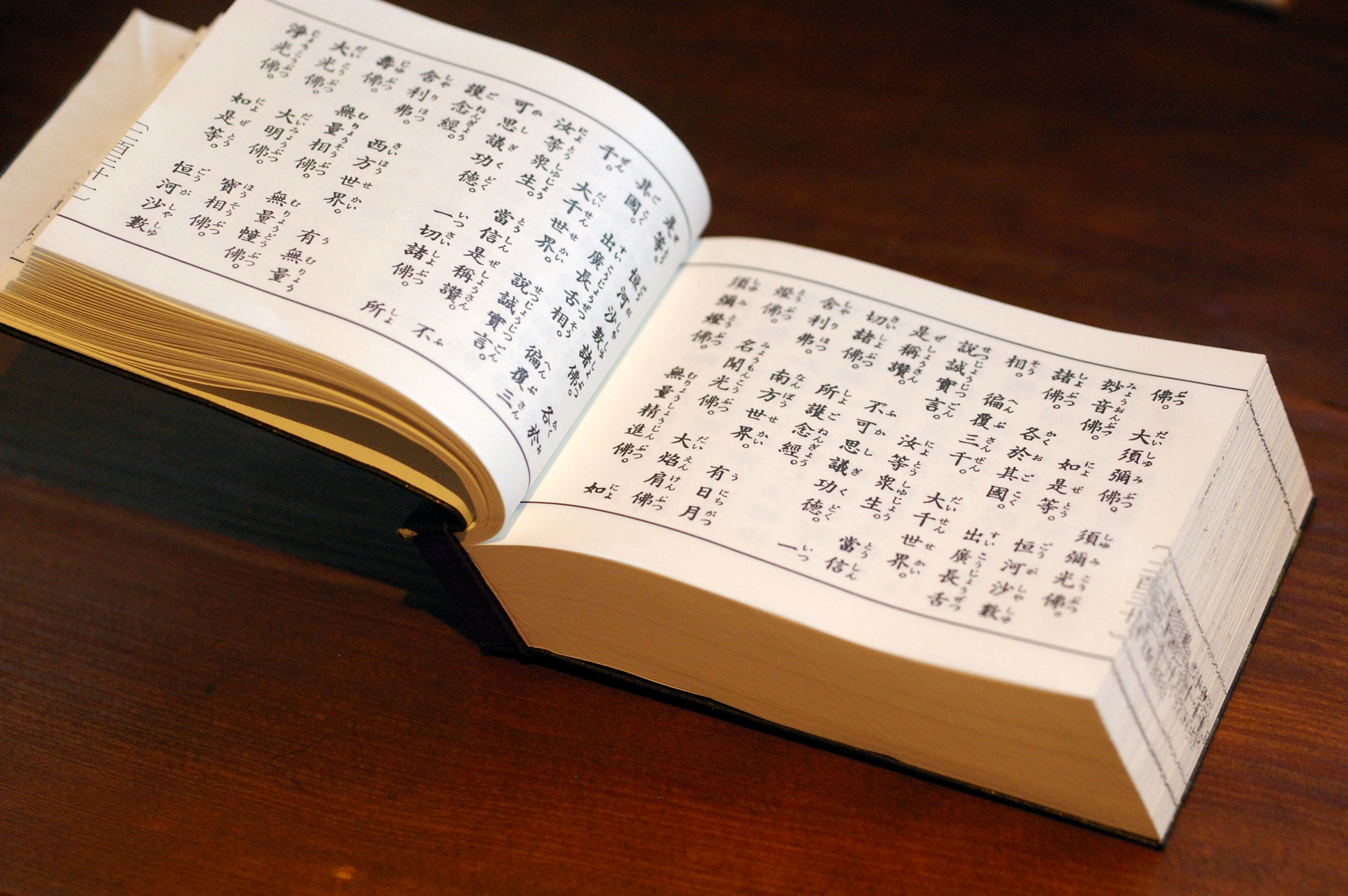
Japanese sutra book open to the Shorter Sukhāvatīvyūha Sūtra

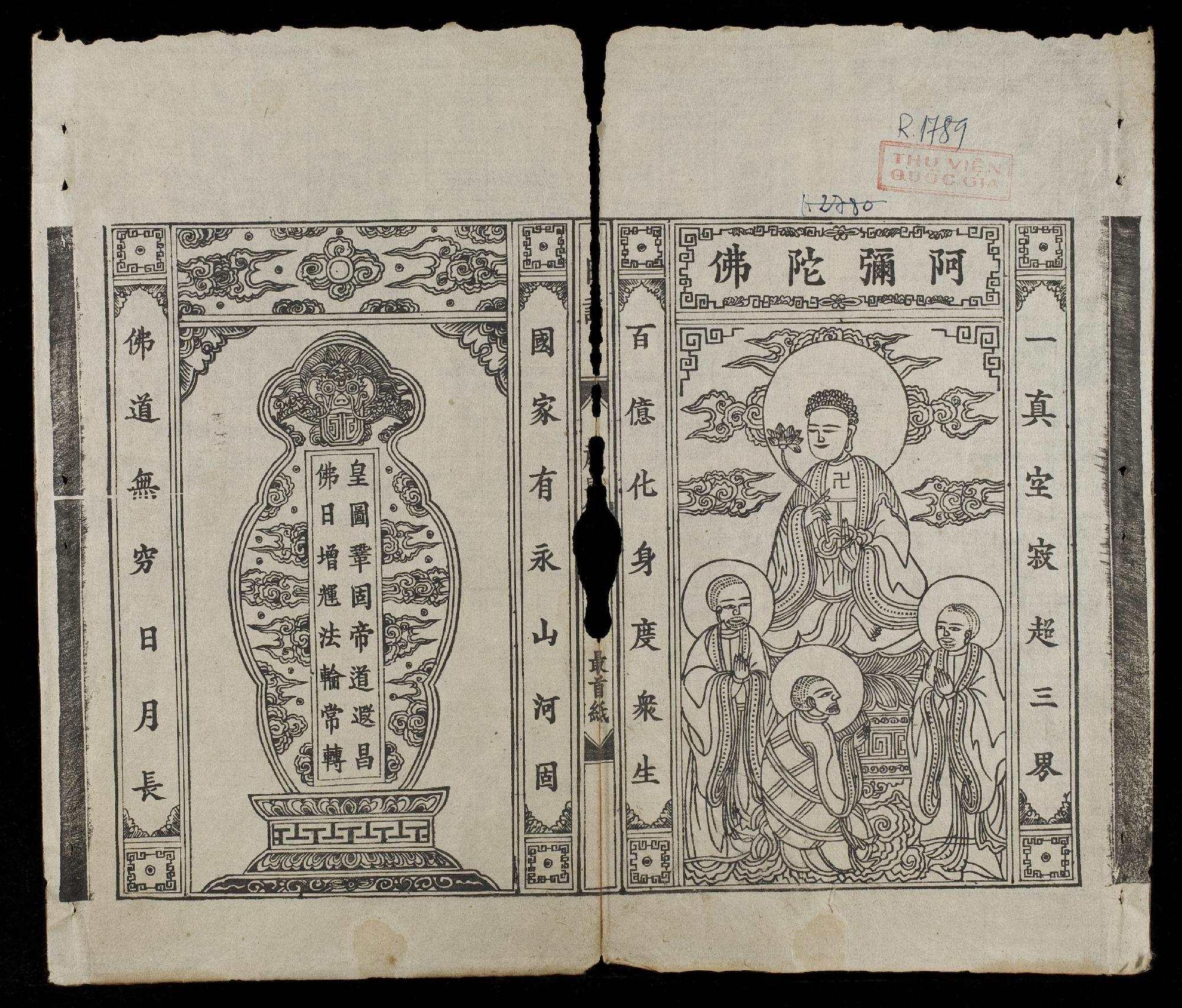
Shorter Sukhāvatīvyūha Sūtra in Vietnam, 1600s

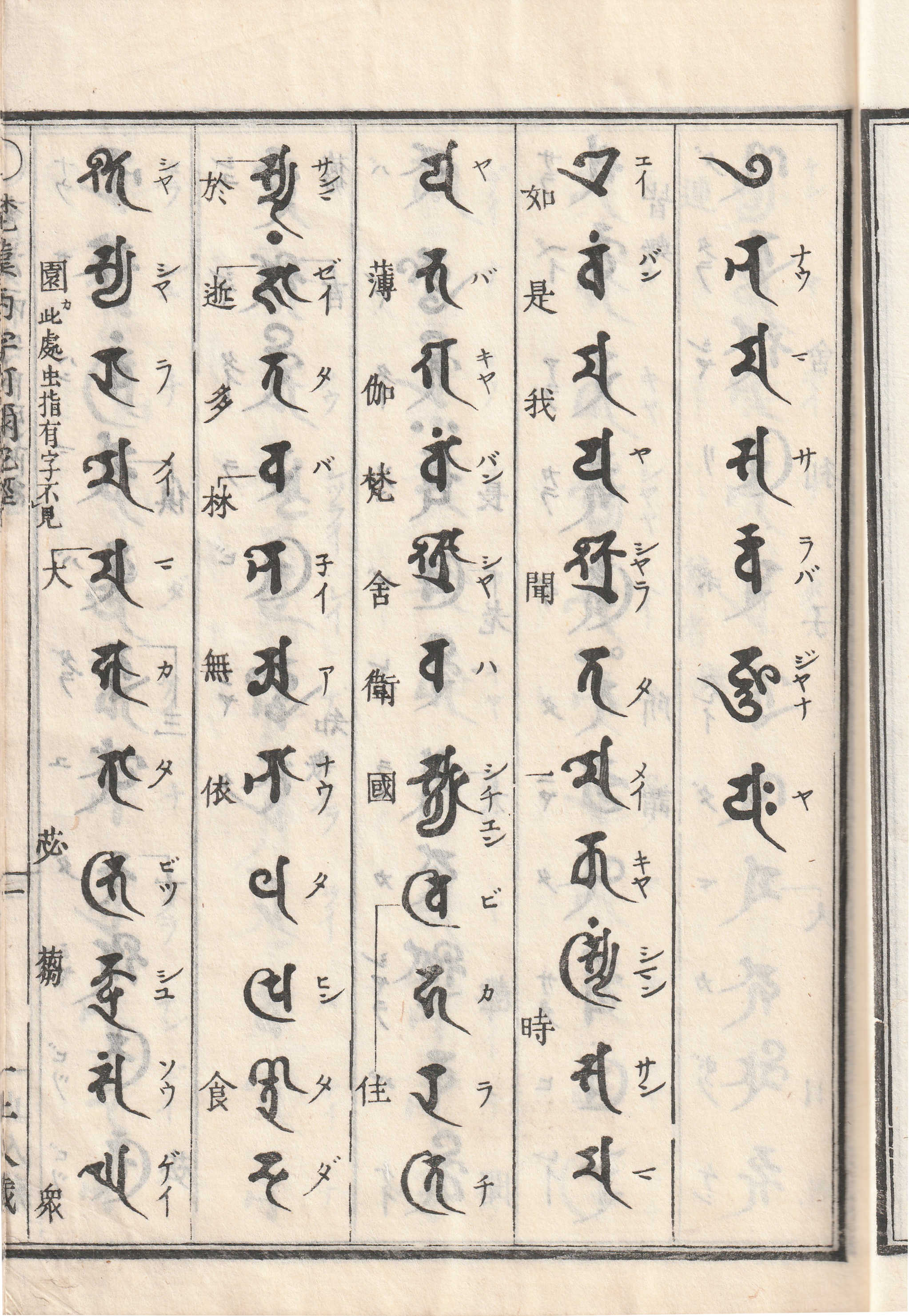
Shorter Sukhāvatīvyūha Sūtra written in katakana, Siddhaṃ scripts and kanji. Published in 1773 in Japan.

The Amitābha Sūtra (Sanskrit: *Amitâbha-buddha-sūtra; Ch.: 阿彌陀經, pinyin: Āmítuó Jīng, or 佛說阿彌陀經, Fóshuō Āmítuó Jīng; Jp.: Amida Kyō, Vi.: A Di Đà Kinh), also known as the [Shorter] Sukhāvatīvyūha Sūtra (Sanskrit, The Array of "the Blissful Land", or The Arrangement of Sukhāvatī) is one of the two Indian Mahayana sutras that describe Sukhāvatī, the Pure Land of Buddha Amitābha. Amitābha is one of the most popular Buddhas in Mahayana Buddhism, known for having generated a pure realm free of suffering where all sentient beings can attain rebirth in after death.

The text was initially translated into Chinese in 402 by Kumārajīva (Taishō Tripiṭaka no. 366) and it is also known in Chinese as the "Small Sutra" (Xiaojing).

The Amitābha Sūtra is highly influential in East Asian Buddhism, including China, Korea, Japan, and Vietnam since it is considered one of the "Three Pure Land" sutras which are the key scriptures in Pure Land Buddhism.

== History ==
The Amitābha Sūtra was translated from an Indic language into Classical Chinese by Tripiṭaka master Kumārajīva in 402. The original Sukhāvatīvyūha sutras may have existed in India as early as the first or second centuries CE (during the Kushan era). They may have been composed in Gandhari or some other Prakrit language. A later translation of this sutra was completed by Xuanzang (602-664 C.E.), but it is not as widely used as Kumārajīva's, which is the standard edition in the East Asian tradition.

The sutra was commented on by numerous East Asian authors. The 7th century Pure Land patriarch Shandao commented on the sutra in his Fashizan 法事讚 (Praise for Dharma Rites), which focuses on the rites associated with the recitation of the sutra.

Numerous Chinese commentaries were composed on this sutra, including those by Sengzhao (384–414), Zhiyi (538–597 CE), Wohnyo, Huijing (578-645 CE) and Kuiji (632-682 CE). The work of these figures raised the status of the Amitābha Sūtra, and it became a central text in Chinese Buddhism. Today, it remains a very popular sutra in East Asian Buddhism. Its short length has also contributed to it becoming a widely chanted sutra in Buddhist temples and monasteries. Later Chinese figures continued to comment on the sutra. During the Song dynasty, Yuanzhao (Chinese: 元照, 1048–1116) composed a commentary that draws on the various views found in Tiantai and in Shandao.

The Ming dynasty saw a revival of commentarial work on this sutra, the Eighth Patriarch of the Chinese Pure Land tradition, Yunqi Zhuhong (1535–1615), composed an influential commentary called the Foshuo Amituo jing shumiao (佛說阿彌陀經疏鈔) which explains the sutra from the perspective of Huayan's teaching of principle and phenomena. The revivalist Thirtieth Patriarch of the Tiantai tradition Youxi Chuandeng (1554-1628) also wrote a commentary, the Amituo Jing lüjie yuanzhong miao (阿彌陀經略解圓中鈔) which explains the explains the sutra from the perspective of Tiantai doctrines. Another Ming era commentary called the Foshuo Amituo jing yaojie (佛說阿彌陀經要解) was later written by the Ninth Patriarch of the Chinese Pure Land tradition, Ouyi Zhixu (1599–1655), and has been translated into English as Mind Seal of the Buddhas by J.C. Cleary. The three Ming-era commentaries were later highly endorsed by various eminent monks, including the Thirteenth Patriarch of the Chinese Pure Land tradition, Yinguang (1862–1940), and remains very influential in contemporary Chinese Pure Land tradition.

The entire sūtra is still chanted as part of daily liturgical services during the evening service (known as the wanke) on odd-numbered days in most Chinese Buddhist temples.

In Japan, Hōnen also commented on the work along with the other Pure Land sutras. The influential Japanese Pure Land thinker Shinran (1173- 1263) also wrote a series of notes and marginalia to a copy of the sutra, which is now known as the Amida-kyō chū (阿弥陀経註).

In Vietnam, the monk Hương Hải (1628 - 1715) wrote a vernacular exegesis on the Amitābha Sūtra, his commentary was later compiled into a work entitled Di Đà kinh thích giải Hoa ngôn (彌陀經釋解華言).

A study in English of both the Amitabha and the Amitayus sutras (known as the "longer" Sukhāvatīvyūha in Sanskrit) was also published by Luis O. Gomez in 1996.

== Content ==
The bulk of the Sukhāvatīvyūha Sūtra, considerably shorter than other Pure Land sutras, consists of a discourse that Gautama Buddha gave at Jetavana in Śrāvastī to his disciple Śāriputra. The teaching concerns the wonderful adornments and features found in the buddhafield (or "pure land") of Sukhāvatī ("the Blissful"), including jeweled ponds, colorful jeweled lotuses, raining flowers, jeweled trees that make Dharma sounds, and so on. It also discusses the beings that reside there, including the Buddha Amitābha (meaning "Measureless Light" or "Boundless Radiance"), who is said to be so called because "the light of the Tathāgata Amitābha shines unimpeded throughout all buddha realms".

The text also describes what one must do to be reborn in Sukhāvatī. In the sutra, Śākyamuni teaches that one must vow to be born in Sukhāvatī and single-mindedly focus on Buddha Amitābha, and then after death they will be reborn in the pure land. The key passage which describes these instructions states (translation from the Sanskrit edition):

Moreover, O Śāriputra, beings should make vows towards that buddha-land. Why? Because, indeed, they come together with good people of such forms. O Śāriputra, beings do not arise in the buddha-land of Amitāyus Tathāgata by insignificant wholesome roots. O Śāriputra, whichever son of good family or daughter of good family, will hear the name of that Bhagavān, Amitāyus Tathāgata, and having heard it will think of it, or will think of it with a mind that is undistracted for one night, or two nights, or three nights, or four nights, or five nights, or six nights, or seven nights, when that son of good family or daughter of good family will die, at their time of death, that Amitāyus Tathāgata, surrounded by a saṅgha of śrāvakas and headed by a chain of bodhisattvas will stand before them and they will die with an undisturbed mind. Having died, they will arise in the world system Sukvāvatī, the Buddha-land of just that Amitāyus Tathāgata. Therefore, then, O Śāriputra, seeing this intention, I thus say: a son of good family or a daughter of good family should devotedly make vows of aspiration towards that Buddha-land.

The Buddha then describes the various buddhas of the six directions and how they also teach the same teaching on rebirth in Sukhāvatī in their own buddhalands. Hence, the Buddha explains how an alternative title to this sutra is "Embraced by all Buddhas", since all Buddhas expound the teaching of faith in the pure land.

The sutra ends with the Buddha stating that this teaching is actually very difficult to believe, calling it "the most difficult of difficulties" and "the Dharma which is the most difficult to accept by all the world."

== Commentaries ==
Key extant commentaries include:

- Huijing 慧淨 (578-645) Emituo jing yishu 阿彌陀經義疏 (T1756).
- Kuiji's (632-682) Emituo jing yishu and Emituo jing tongzan shu 阿彌陀經通贊疏 (T1758).
- Wŏnhyo's (617-686) Amituo Jing Shu 阿彌陀經疏
- Wŏnch'ŭk (613–696) commentary
- Emituo jing yiji 阿彌陀經義記 (T 1755), traditionally attributed to Zhiyi (unlikely)
- Zhiyuan's 智圓 (976-1022) Emituo jing yishu (T1760)
- Yuanzhao's (1048-1116) Emituo jing yishu (T1761)
- Genshin's (942-1017) Amida-kyō Ryakuki (Abridged Notes on the Amitābha Sūtra)
- Jiedu's 戒度 (12th century) Emituo jing yishu wenchi ji 阿彌陀經義疏聞持記
- Hōnen's (1133-1212) commentary to the Amitabha Sutra
- Xingcheng's 性澄 (1265-1342) Emituo jing jujie 阿彌陀經句解
- Dayou's 大佑 (1334-1407) Emituo jing lüejie 阿彌陀經略解
- Youxi Chuandeng's (1554-1627) Emituo jing lüejie yuanzhong chao 阿彌陀經略解圓中鈔
- Zhuhong's (1535-1615) Emituo jing shuchao 阿彌陀經疏鈔
- Dahui's 大慧 (1564-1636) Emituo jing jijue 阿彌陀經已訣
- Ouyi Zhixu's (1599-1655) Emituo jing yaojie 阿彌陀經要解 (T1762)
- Xu Huaiting's 徐槐廷 Emituo jing shuchao xie 阿彌陀經疏鈔擷
- Jingting's 淨挺 Emituo jing shexiang 阿彌陀經舌相
- Baiting Xufa's 續法 (1641-1728) Emituo jing lüezhu 阿彌陀經略注
- Peng Jiqing's (1740-1796) Emituo jing yuelun 阿彌陀經約論.

== English translations ==
Multiple English translations of the various editions (Chinese, Sanskrit, Tibetan) have been completed and published.

=== From Sanskrit ===
- Müller, Max, and Bunyiu Nanjio, trans. “Āryasukhāvatīvyūhasūtra.” Anecdota Oxoniensia: Aryan Series. Vol. I, part II. Oxford: Clarendon Press, 1883.
- Gomez, Luis, trans. (1996), The Land of Bliss: The Paradise of the Buddha of Measureless Light: Sanskrit and Chinese Versions of the Sukhavativyuha Sutras, Honolulu: University of Hawaii Press. Gomez calls this edition a "more "free" translation" in the preface.
- Shaku Shingan (Alexander O'Neill, 2002), The Shorter Sukhāvatīvyūha Sūtra. Translated from the Sanskrit edition of P.L. Vaidya, in Mahāyāna-sūtra-saṃgraha, Part I. Darbhanga: The Mithila Institute 1961. Pages 254-257.

=== From Kumārajīva's Chinese ===
- Utsuki, Nishu. The Smaller Sukhāvatīvyūha Sūtra or The Sūtra on the Buddha Amitāyus: Translated from the Chinese Version of Kumārajīva. Kyoto: Educational Department of the West, Hongwanji, 1924.
- Inagaki, Hisao, trans. (2003). The Three Pure Land Sutras (Numata Center for Buddhist Translation and Research, BDK English Tripiṭaka Series)
- Jodo Shinshu Hongwanji-ha translation group. The Sutra on Amida Buddha Delivered by Śākyamuni Buddha in The Three Pure Land Sutra (2 Vols), Shin Buddhism Translation Series. This version improves on Inagaki's earlier translation and adds an extensive scholarly apparatus, with notes, etc.
- Jōdo-shū Research Institute (2014). The Three Pure Land Sutras: The Principle of Pure Land Buddhism, Jōdo-shū Press.

=== From the Tibetan translation ===
- Sakya Pandita Translation Group (2011), The Display of the Pure Land of Sukhāvatī (Toh 115), translated from the Tibetan translation of Dānaśīla and Yeshé Dé c. eighth or ninth century.

=== Commentaries ===
- McBride II, Richard. "Wŏnhyo’s Commentary on the Amitābha Sūtra", Chapter 5 in Halkias, Georgios T.; Payne, Richard K. (2019). Pure Lands in Asian Texts and Contexts (An Anthology).
- Cleary, J.C. Mind-seal of the Buddhas: Patriarch Ou-i's Commentary on the Amitābha Sūtra. Corporate Body of the Buddha Educational Foundation, 2000.

== See also ==
- Longer Sukhāvatīvyūha Sūtra (Amitayus Sutra)
- Amitāyus Contemplation Sūtra
- Sukhavati
- Amitābha
