= Hanshan Deqing =

Ming dynasty Chinese Buddhist monk (1546–1623)

- Hānshān Déqīng
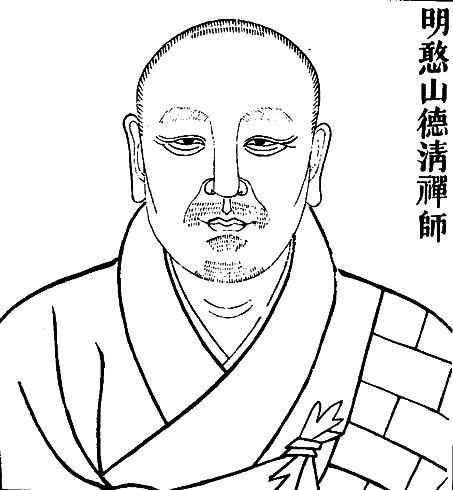
- Chinese woodblock illustration of Hanshan Deqing

Monastic and Abbot

Personal life
- Born: 5 November 1546 Quanjiao, Nanzhili Province (now modern Anhui Province)
- Died: 5 November 1623 (aged 77) Nanhua Temple, Caoxi, Guangdong Province
- Resting place: Nanhua Temple, Caoxi, Guangdong Province
- Parent: Father: Cai Yen Gao
- Era: Ming Dynasty
- Region: Jiangnan

Religious life
- Religion: Buddhism
- Sect: Chan and Pure Land
- Dharma name: Deqing (formerly Cheng Yin)

Hanshan Deqing (traditional Chinese: 憨山德清, Wade Giles: Han-Shan Te-Ch’ing, "Crazy Mountain, Virtuous Clarity", c. 1546–1623), was a leading Buddhist monk and poet of the late Ming dynasty China. He was also posthumously named Hongjue Chanshi (弘覺禪師). Hanshan was known for studying and teaching Pure Land, Huayan and Chan Buddhism. He is known as one of the four great masters of the Wanli Era Ming Dynasty, along with Yunqi Zhuhong (1535–1613) and Zibo Zhenke (1543–1603) both of whom he knew personally. He also wrote their biographies after their deaths.

Hanshan has remained an influential figure in Chinese Chan Buddhism down to the twentieth century. His works are widely printed and published in various editions. His teachings were most recently promoted by modern figures like Xuyun (1840?-1959) and his disciple Charles Luk (1898–1978).

== Life ==
=== Early life ===
Hanshan was born in Quanjiao, thirty miles west of modern Nanjing (in modern Anhui). His mother was a great devotee of Guanyin and encouraged his studies. He became a monk at 11 and was fully ordained as a bhiksu at 18 at the Great Bao’en Temple. While there he studied literature as well as religious subjects and began writing poetry when he was 17. Two years later he was ordained as a Chan monk under the Buddhist name of Cheng Yin. He studied under Yungu Fahui (at Mt. Xixia) and Fangguang.

He also studied Huayan Buddhism under Wuji Mingxin (1512–1574), a great Huayan master of the time and a student of Lu'an Putai (fl. 1511) of Da Xinglong monastery in Beijing. After hearing Wuji's lectures on the Avatamsaka sutra, Hanshan became very interested in Huayan and the thought of Patriarch Qingliang Chengguan. In 1565 Hanshan also took part in a meditation retreat led by Yungu Fahui. Hanshan practiced nianfo (buddha name recitation) for around three months, after which he had a great insight. After this, he started the Chan-practice of focusing on the question "Who is repeating the Buddha's name?"

Bao’en monastery burned down in 1566 after being struck by lightning. Hanshan busied himself for some years in keeping the community together, teaching, and raising money for the monastery's debts.

=== Travels, religious activities and influence at court ===
Then in 1571, at the age of 26, Hanshan set out as a religious wanderer, traveling to different regions and Buddhist temples and monasteries in search of instructions. He visited different regions, including Beijing, where he studied various subjects like Pure Land, Chan, pramana, and Weishi with various Beijing area masters.

After four years he traveled to and explored Mount Wutai always carrying with him biography of Huayan patriarch Qingliang. During this period he saw the mountain peak called Hanshan (foolish mountain) and he adopted the name as his own style name. Hanshan then continued his travels, visiting Beijing again. He read the works of Sengzhao and had a powerful awakening experience afterwards and had an insight into the non-duality of all things.

Hanshan then went back to Mt. Wutai in 1575, staying at an abandoned house and focusing on meditation. He developed strong samadhi (meditative absorption) and had some powerful experiences, called his major awakening or satori by Charles Luk. He did not have a teacher to guide him and instead made use of the Surangama sutra to verify his own enlightenment.

In 1577, while on Mount Wutai he decided to copy the entire Avatamsaka Sutra in his own blood (mixed with gold powder). When the Empress Dowager Xiaoding heard of his intention, she provided gold papers for the project, which was the beginning of the close but complicated relationship between Hanshan and the Empress Dowager. The copying of the sutra took two years, and at every stroke Hanshan recited the name of Amitabha Buddha, attaining great concentration and reportedly being able to converse during this practice. He had various dreams related to the Avatamsaka during this time, in which he saw Qingliang Chengguan, Maitreya and Manjusri. The project was finished in 1581 and a ceremony was held to have the sutra installed into a pagoda.

By 1583 he had become famous as a Buddhist Master and set out traveling to remote areas again. It was at this time that he prefixed his name with that of Hanshan Peak so as to return to anonymity. In consequence of having organized a successful ceremony to ensure the birth of a male heir to the throne while he was still at Mount Wutai, Hanshan obtained the patronage of the emperor's mother. With her support he was able eventually to establish a new monastery at Mount Lao on the coast of the Shandong Peninsula. This new monastery was called Haiyinsi (Ocean Seal) and it was granted a full copy of the Buddhist canon by the empress dowager. By this time Hanshan was described by his friend Miao-feng as being unable to walk alone, suggesting by this point in his life he had become partially paralysed from his intense meditation practice, an affliction which would remain with him for the rest of his life. During his stay at Haiyinsi, Hanshan studied, lectured and composed various commentaries, including commentaries on the Surangama sutra and the Heart Sutra.

=== Exile period and life in the south ===
When relations between the Wanli Emperor and his mother broke down over the choice of heir, Hanshan was caught in a conflict which also included tensions between Daoists and Buddhists. In 1595, he was put on trial, tortured, and imprisoned. This was due to his close relationship with the empress Dowager and as such mainly served as a scapegoat. After this the monastery at Haiyin was destroyed (as Hanshan had been found guilty of building it without government approval). Hanshan was defrocked and exiled to a border region in Guangdong. He traveled there under military supervision with three disciples, dressed as a common prisoner with hair and beard grown.

While in Guandong, he visited various places, including Guangzhou, where he met with various important scholars, including Chou ju-teng, a teacher of Wang Yangming's philosophy. During this time Hanshan also attracted many Confucian students who studied his Buddhist interpretations of Confucian classics (during this time he wrote a commentary on the Doctrine of the Mean). During this period he also visited Lei-chou temple and wrote commentaries to the Lankavatara sutra and the Lotus sutra. He also started a campaign against killing animals during local festivals.

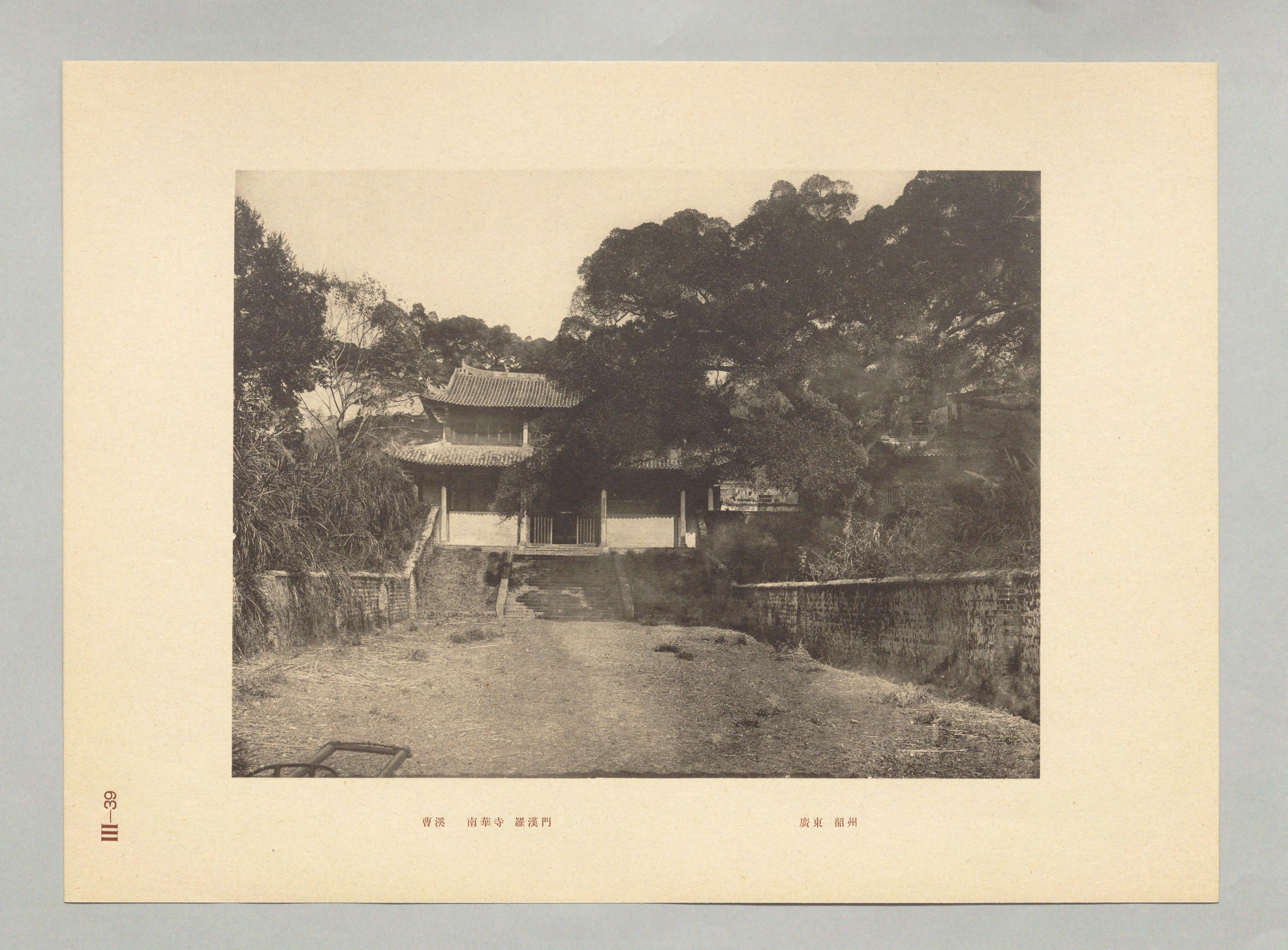
Nanhua temple between 1939 and 1941

Hanshan also visited and stayed at Caoxi where the sixth patriarch Huineng had resided. He spent some years (1601 to 1609) working to restore and revive Nanhua Temple (of the Sixth Patriarch) at Caoxi. Since the time that Huineng was entombed there, the area had been converted into a meat market by local gangs and the temple's monks were unable to do anything. Hanshan appealed to the supreme commander at Guanzhou for help. Some of the local monks at the temple also made a false accusation of embezzlement of the restoration funds against him in 1610, although he was later acquitted. Hsu Sung-Peng says these monks may have been supported by the local shop keepers and merchants driven away by Hanshan.

Hanshan became officially a free man in 1611. From that period onwards he remained in Guangdong teaching until 1613.

=== At Hengshan and Lushan ===
In 1613 Hanshan left for Hengshan in Hunan Province. He also spent his time traveling across Hunan province and teaching. From 1616 to 1617 Hanshan undertook what became known as his 'Journey to the East' wherein he travelled from Hunan to the regions of Anhui, Jiangsu and Zhejiang, the rough region of his upbringing. This journey carried not only a personal significance for Hanshan but also a religious significance, since 'west' is the general direction from which Buddhism entered China, and also the direction of Sukhavati in which the Buddha Amitabha and Bodhisattva Guanyin both reside, placing Hanshan firmly in the role of a traveling Bodhisattva. Everywhere he traveled he was welcomed enthusiastically by laypeople, monks and especially government officials. During this period he focused his teachings more towards Pure Land teachings since his friend Zhuhong who was prominent in the region was most well remembered for his Pure Land teachings. He is recorded as having used Buddhist means to heal the sick particularly through nianfo practice.

From 1617 to 1621 he lived at Lushan in Jiangxi province, helping build a monastery there (Fayun monastery). During his time at this mountain, he edited and condensed the teachings of master Qingliang on the Avatamsaka sutra. This led to Hanshan's Hua-yen kang-yao (Outline of the Avatamsaka sutra). He also devoted himself to Pure Land practice at this time, inspired by master Huiyuan.

At the request of his disciples, Hanshan moved back to Nanhua Temple at Caoxi in 1622 to spend his final years. His disciples record the final year of his life teaching to large gatherings in Caoxi and maintaining the temple there. On the day he died he called a large gathering of his students and they collectively recited Amitabha's name before Hanshan said:

Be not disturbed. You must act according to the Buddhist regulations. Do not [when I die] wear hempen cloth or mourning garment [as secular people do]. Do not weep or cry. Recite Amitabha's name with all your heart.

At 4pm on 5 November 1623, Hanshan died at age 78, seated upright. His body was enshrined at Nanhua temple (right next to Huineng's) where it continued to be venerated until the present day with various offerings.

== Teaching ==
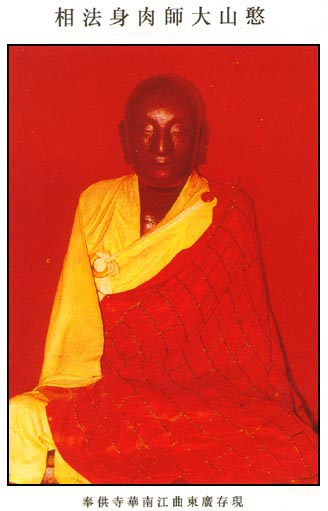
Hanshan's mummy, at Nanhua Monastery (曹溪 Caoxi, near 韶关 Shaoguan, Guangdong Province).

Hanshan Deqing is regarded as one of the great scholars and reformers of Chinese Buddhism during the later Ming dynasty. He is renowned as a lecturer and commentator and was admired for his strict adherence to the precepts. Hanshan drew on the Chan and Huayan doctrine of the "One Mind" (drawn from the Awakening of Faith) as a way to unify all Buddhist schools and all of the three teachings (Buddhism, Confucianism and Daoism). While Hanshan saw the Huayan teachings and the Avatamsaka sutra as the most fundamental and supreme teaching of the Buddhadharma, he also drew on the teachings of the Tiantai and Weishi schools.

Hanshan held that all the three teachings taught about the same ultimate truth of Mind, though they differed in how deep their insight into the Mind went. Indeed, Hanshan saw the study of all three teachings as essential and wrote commentaries on both Daoist classics (like the Laozi and the Zhuangzi) and Confucian classics (like the Great Learning and the Doctrine of the Mean).

=== Ultimate reality ===
Hanshan's view of the ultimate truth is a synthesis of Huayan, Yogacara and Tiantai, with a focus on the ultimate enlightened mind (xin, or "One Mind") as the non-dual essence (體; tǐ) of all things, which is also empty, and is the source of all phenomena and characteristics. His metaphysics is thus similar to the syncretic view of Yongming Yanshou and the thought of Fazang and Qingliang Chengguan. Hanshan's view of the One Mind also strongly relies on the Awakening of Faith.

For Hanshan, the One Mind (i.e. the Buddha-nature) is the most important Buddhist teaching. Hanshan wrote:

The fundamental teaching of Buddhism is nothing but the doctrine of One Mind. This Mind is originally perfect and vastly illuminating. It is clear and pure, containing nothing, not even a fine dust. There is neither delusion nor enlightenment, neither birth nor death, neither saints nor sinners. Sentient beings and Buddhas are of the same fundamental nature (ti). There are no two natures to distinguish them. This is why Bodhidharma came from the west to teach the Chan method of "direct pointing" to the original true Mind.

Hanshan also describes the One Mind as follows:

This wisdom is the Buddha-nature that we originally possess. It is also called Self-Mind (tzu-hsin) or Self-Nature (tzu-hsing). This essence (t'i) is originally undefiled, so it is called "clear and pure". It is originally without darkness, so it is called "bright". It is originally vast and all inclusive, so it is called "void and empty". It is originally without delusion, so it is called "the one truth". It is originally immutable, so it is called tathata. It is originally illuminating everywhere, so it is called "perfect enlightenment". It is originally calm and extinct, so it is called "nirvana".

=== View of Buddhist practice ===
For Hanshan, all Buddhist methods are but skillful means which point to the One Mind and are to be seen as medicinal treatments to cure the sickness of samsara. They are not to be clung to as ultimate. Regarding practice, Jiang Wu writes that for Ming era Chan masters like Hanshan, meditative practice was seen as something that had to be combined with the study (chiang) of scripture and doctrine. Hanshan was a student of Chinese Buddhist thought, especially Huayan school philosophy. Indeed, according to Hsu Sung-Peng, Hanshan used Huayan philosophy "as the harmonizing and integrating principle of all other schools of thought and scriptures....his philosophy of Mind is essentially the Hua-yen philosophy, as he understood it."

For Hanshan, the study of Buddhist literature goes together with meditative practice, and he criticized those who only focused on one without the other. For example, Hanshan criticized certain Chan monks of his time who rejected study of the scriptures in favor of simply discussing koans and acting in bizarre ways which just mimicked koan stories or made use of witty remarks. According to Hanshan, these people "only know how to condemn scriptural studies, and do not know that the Mind expounded in the scriptures is the foundation of the Ch'an teaching." However, Hanshan also criticized those who studied scriptures without getting the true meaning, becoming caught up in language and solving intellectual puzzles. As such, he focused on the practical and meditative aspects of the scriptures over and above the theoretical elements.

Hanshan also emphasized the importance of the basic Buddhist precepts (for laypeople) and the full Vinaya precepts (for monastics) as an essential foundation for all Buddhist practice. For laypersons he recommended the bodhisattva precepts of the Brahmajala sutra.

Hanshan taught various means of Buddhist practice which he saw as useful. These include studying scriptures to understand the meaning, reciting the scriptures with concentration (which he saw as a kind of meditative practice), recitation of dharanis (like the Śūraṅgama Mantra), nianfo (recitation of the Buddha name), śamatha-vipaśyanā (zhiguan), Chan huatou - gong'an practice and even some esoteric methods. One of Hanshan's meditation methods was the Śūraṅgama Sūtra's meditation on hearing practiced by Guanyin, and it is this method which led to Hanshan's enlightenment in 1575.

=== On Chan practice ===
Regarding Chan Buddhism, according to Wu, Ming era Chan masters like Hanshan and Yunqi Zhuhong emphasized self-cultivation instead of reliance on "formulaic instructions from pretentious masters". Certain Ming figures like Hanshan also de-emphasized dharma transmission and instead lauded masters who practiced meditation and asceticism on their own. The idea was that one could obtain “wisdom without teachers” (wushizhi). Jiang Wu writes that Deqing questioned the value of Dharma transmission and believed that the enlightenment of the mind was more important than nominal claims of transmission. Due to this attitude, despite becoming a famous figure of Ming Buddhism, Hanshan never himself received formal dharma transmission (nor did he pass on any transmission himself). Hanshan also criticized the Linji lineage of his time, which he saw as a recent re-creation instead of an actual transmission of an ancient lineage.

Hanshan saw the truth of Chan as not being different from the teachings on Mind found in the Mahayana scriptures. He was also uninterested in the Linji school's "beating and shouting" teaching methods. While he made use of the huatou method, he did not see it as supreme like the Linji school did, drawing instead on numerous skillful means found in the sutras. Hanshan saw the fundamental method of Chan as "only to understand and realize your own mind." He saw this fundamental teaching reflected in the Lankavatara, which states "sitting quietly in mountains and forests, cultivate your-self in all aspects, and you can see the flowing of illusory thoughts in your own mind," and in a quote by Bodhidharma which states "you have only to stop all external sensations, put to rest all internal turmoil, and keep your mind like a wall, then you can enter the path". Hsu Sung-Peng notes that Hanshan saw the practice of huatou as a useful method for those who, in this degenerate age, were unable to make use of the direct method taught by the ancients of contemplating the Mind.

According to Hanshan, the Chan huatou method is useful because Chan students have numerous karmic seeds that produce endless trains of thought and without a tool we cannot cut this flow of thoughts off. So "a meaningless sentence is given to the student to "put his teeth on" (as a stabilizing point), so that all the external and internal conditions and thoughts can be put to rest. Since he cannot put them to rest at once, he is taught to hold the huatou (like a sword) and cut the web of illusion as he would cut a knotted net. The flow of consciousness is then broken down. This was exactly Bodhidharma's method..." Hanshan also warns that,

this method is not meant for you to think about the meaning of a kung-an as if the kung-an were a question for intellectual solution. Speaking of the hua-t’ou method, Ta-hui taught his disciples to kill the “sneaky mind” with a cold-blooded hand. According to him, the first principle of Ch’an practice is to empty one’s mind. One must first paste the two words “life-death” on the forehead, and regard them as seriously as if one owed a debt of a million taels. In day or night, while drinking or eating, traveling or staying at home, sitting or lying, entertaining friends, in a quiet moment or at a noisy hour, you must hold on to the hua-t’ou.

After much determined and uninterrupted contemplative practice, which Hanshan calls "a long fight", this method can lead to a breaking down of all concepts and illusions. Hanshan describes this enlightenment experience as follows: "suddenly you will find that the Lotus-mind breams with a bright light, illuminating the ten directions of the universe." Hanshan saw the Chan method as a way to awaken to the one pure mind in this very life (as opposed to seeing nianfo as merely a way to reach the Pure Land after death). Hanshan saw this method as something which could be applied to classic huatou or to the practice of nianfo (reciting the Buddha's name).

=== Chan and Pure land ===
Like many of his contemporaries, Hanshan advocated the practice of both Chan and Pure Land methods, the dual practice of which became known as Nianfo-Chan. He may have been influenced on this topic by the work of Yongming Yanshou (whom Hanshan praised) who likewise synthesized Pure-land and Chan from the perspective of the One Mind doctrine.

While Hanshan certainly saw the Chan way as the superior method for those of higher faculties, he did not reject the method of simple recitation of the Buddha's name with a wish to be reborn in the pure land of the Amitabha. While he saw this simple Pure Land path as a valid method which can enhance one's faith and purify the mind, he also saw it as a method for beginners (if it was practiced as a mindless oral recitation without greater understanding and insight). Hanshan criticized this lesser way of practice as follows:

The practice of nianfo seeking rebirth in the Pure Land aimed originally at penetrating the great matter of samsara. That is why it was phrased, "nianfo and penetrate samsara" (念佛了生死; niànfó liǎo shēngsǐ). People of today generate the mind to penetrate samsara, but they are only willing to nianfo. [They think that by] merely saying “buddha,” they will penetrate samsara. If one does not know the roots of samsara, then in what direction can you nian? If the mind that engages in nianfo cannot cut off the roots of samsara, then how can it penetrate samsara?

However, Hanshan also saw the Pure land path as the more useful and expedient path for most people of his time, which he saw as having entered the degenerate age. Since the Chan path was mostly for people of the highest spiritual capacity as well as for those who had the time to practice this under competent masters, Hanshan recommended the much easier pure land way to most people, especially to most laypersons. Hanshan describes this path as follows: "the primary method of Buddha-recitation, the practice of contemplating the pure realm, the guidance of reciting Mahayana scriptures, the determination of making the wish (to be born in the Western paradise), and the charitable deeds that bring about blissful reward." In a letter to a vassal prince, Hanshan recommends a simpler form of practice which entails homage to the Buddha, reciting a sutra (like the Longer Sukhāvatīvyūha Sūtra), reciting the Buddha Amitabha's name (three, five, or ten thousand times with a mala) and then dedicating all the merit to be reborn in the pure land. Hanshan taught the use of niànfó (念佛), the Pure Land method of recitation of Amitabha's name and applied it to the Chan "critical phrase" (huatou) method. According to this method which Hanshan learned from Chan master Yungu Fahui (1500–1579), one recites the name of Amitabha and questions "who is reciting the name of the Buddha?", while letting go of any attempts to find an intellectual or conceptual answer to the question. Hanshan describes this nianfo Chan method as follows:

At the very moment the name is uttered, it must be the point at which all doubts and delusions are put to rest. At the same time, you ask "Who is it that recites the Buddha's name"? You ask the same question every time you utter the name. When you rely steadily on the hua-t'ou all illusions and confused thoughts will be instantly broken down as the in the cutting of knotted threads. When there is no longer any place for them to arise, all that is left is one thought (of Amitabha). The thought becomes to clear and brights that it is like the shining sun in the empty sky. When illusion does not arise and when defilement disappears, all is calm and transparent.

Hanshan also taught a pure land visualization meditation which he describes as follows:

In your quiet meditation, you constantly visualize the appearance of a large lotus flower as large as a wheel, no matter whether it is green, yellow, red, or white. Meditating on the clear form of the flower, you imagine yourself quietly sitting upright on it. Then visualize that the Buddha sends out his bright light on your body. In so doing, you can either walk, stay, sit or lie down. This goes on day after day, month after month, and year after year. You need only to keep your visualization clear and distinct. There should be no blurring of the image whether you close or open your eyes. Even in your dreams you can also clearly see Amitabha residing in the flower and flanked by Kuan-yin and Tai-shih-chih.

Hanshan says that through this meditation one will see Amitabha at death and the Buddha will welcome you to the pure land at that time.

=== Other practices ===
Hsu Sung-Peng writes that the way Hanshan understood the practice of reciting dharanis is similar to how he understood the practice of nianfo. He recommended various dharanis, like the Cundi dharani, which he saw as effective in clearing karmic obstacles since they are the "vajra mind seals of the Buddha" which can break all things into dust. While advising a Chan monk, Hanshan taught the recitation of dharanis as a huatou, a practice to be done in the same way the nianfo Chan method is done.

Regarding the recitation of scriptures, Hanshan similarly held that one should recite them as a kind of meditation or contemplation to realize the Mind. Similarly, the copying of scripture was taught as a contemplative exercise. In some cases Hanshan taught the recitation of the Buddha's name with each stroke of the pen.

Hanshan also practiced Buddhist rituals, such as the Shuilu Fahui ceremony.

=== Self-cultivation and enlightenment ===
For Hanshan, enlightenment could only be achieved through cultivation (xiū) of the mind. And this cultivation must be done before and also after the experience of enlightenment. As such, Hanshan follows the doctrine of Zongmi of sudden enlightenment, gradual cultivation. Hanshan explains the key points of self-cultivation as follows:

There is no fixed order for gradual cultivation. In our daily life, we need only to hold our mind in constant watch at the moment before the mind is stirred or a thought takes place. We keep our feet steady and introspect the inner state. When a thought occurs, we must thoroughly examine it and trace it to its origin. When it is found that the thought arises from the realm of no-birth, then all illusory notions, feelings, and anxieties will at once disappear just like the melting of ice. The only danger is the lack of great determination to stop the flow of thought as in killing an animal by breaking its neck. In this way, one continues to be in the unawakened state, and the flow of thought cannot be returned to the origin (of no-birth).

== Works ==
Hanshan was a prolific writer, his entire collected works was compiled by his students in the Hānshān lǎorén mèngyóu jí (憨山老人夢遊集; "A record of Elder Hanshan’s dream travels (CBETA X.1456)").

Hanshan also wrote an autobiography, which is the first full autobiography ever written by a Chinese Buddhist monk. In this autobiography, the Hanshan dashi nianpo (Annalistic Biography of Great Master Hanshan), various events of Hanshan's life are narrated, including his important dreams, one of which contains an encounter with master Qingliang.

Some of Hanshan's key works include:

- Shou lengyan jing yuanjing (首楞嚴懸鏡; "Explanation of the Shurangama Sutra")
- Bore boluomiduo xinjing zhishuo (波若波羅蜜多心經直說; "Commentary on the Perfection of Wisdom Sutra")
- Guan lengqie eboduoluo baojing ji (觀楞伽阿跋多羅寶經記; "Contemplation of the Lankavatara sutra")
- Miaofa lianhua jing jijie (妙法蓮華經擊節; "Remarks on the Lotus Sutra")
- Jingang jueyi (金剛決疑; "Interpretation of Doubt in the Diamond Sūtra")
- Fahua pinjie (法華品節; "Stages of the Lotus Sūtra")
- Lengyan tongyi (楞嚴通議; "General Dissertation on the Shurangama Sutra")
- Fahua jing tongyi (法華經通議; "General Dissertation on the Lotus Sūtra")
- Dacheng qixing lun shulüe (大乘起信論疏略; "Commentary on the Treatise on the Awakening of Faith in the Mahayana")
- Zhaolun lüezhu (肇論略注; "Brief Annotations on the Writings of Sengzhao")
- Canchan qieyao (參禪切要; "Essential Points of Chan Contemplation")
- Xingxiang tongshuo (性相通說; "General Dissertation on the Nature of All Things and Their Phenomenal Manifestations")
- Zongjing tang ji (宗鏡堂記; "Notes on the Zongjing Temple")
- Yuanjue jing zhijie (圓覺經直解; "Direct Exposition of the Sūtra on Perfect Enlightenment")
- Qixing lun zhijie (起信論直解; "Direct Dissertation on the Treatise on the Awakening of Faith in the Mahayana")
- Bashiba zu daoying zhuanzan (八十八祖道影傳讚; "Apology on the Path of the Eighty-Eight Patriarchs")
- Huayan gangyao (華嚴綱要; "Essentials of the Flower Ornament Sūtra")
- Hanshan xuyan (憨山緒言; "Prologue by Hanshan")

=== Poetry ===
Hanshan Deqing's poetry is also made an instrument of religious instruction through the use of an elegant and accessible style. It spans from the long doctrinal reflection “Contemplating Mind” to antithetical quatrains composed of balanced couplets:

When the bow's stiff, its string is first to snap;
The sharper a blade is, the easier to chip.
Trouble results from a talkative tongue,
Harmful deeds reflect a hardened heart.

Several of these poems describe the experience of meditation in the hard conditions of a mountain hermitage; others are moral in tone, counselling an attitude of acceptance and the way to social and inner harmony.

== Sources ==
- Cheung, Richard, trans. (1993). The Autobiography and Maxims of Master Han Shan, Honolulu: Hsu Yun Temple; Hong Kong: H.K. Buddhist Book Distributors OCLC 473731126
- Jones, Charles B. (2019), Chinese Pure Land Buddhism, Understanding a Tradition of Practice. University of Hawai‘i Press / Honolulu.
- Luk, Charles (1971), Practical Buddhism
- Hsu Sung-Peng (1979), A Buddhist Leader in Ming China. The Life and Thought of Han-shan Te-Ch'ing, University Park and London: The Pennsylvania State University Press
- To, Lok (1993). Pure Land of the Patriarchs, Zen Master Han-Shan Te Ch'ing, NY: Sutra Translation Committee of the US and Canada
- Wu, Jiang (2008). Enlightenment in Dispute: The Reinvention of Chan Buddhism in Seventeenth-Century China. Oxford University Press, USA.
- Zhuang, Yunyan Hiu (2014). La pensée de Hanshan Deqing (1546–1623) : une lecture bouddhiste des textes confucéens et taoïstes, Religions. Institut National des Langues et Civilisations Orientales- INALCO PARIS - LANGUES O’, 2014. Français. NNT : 2014INAL0014. tel-01155109

== Links ==
An online selection of translations of Hanshan's works
