= Gaoming Temple =

Buddhist temple in Zhejiang, China

- 高明寺
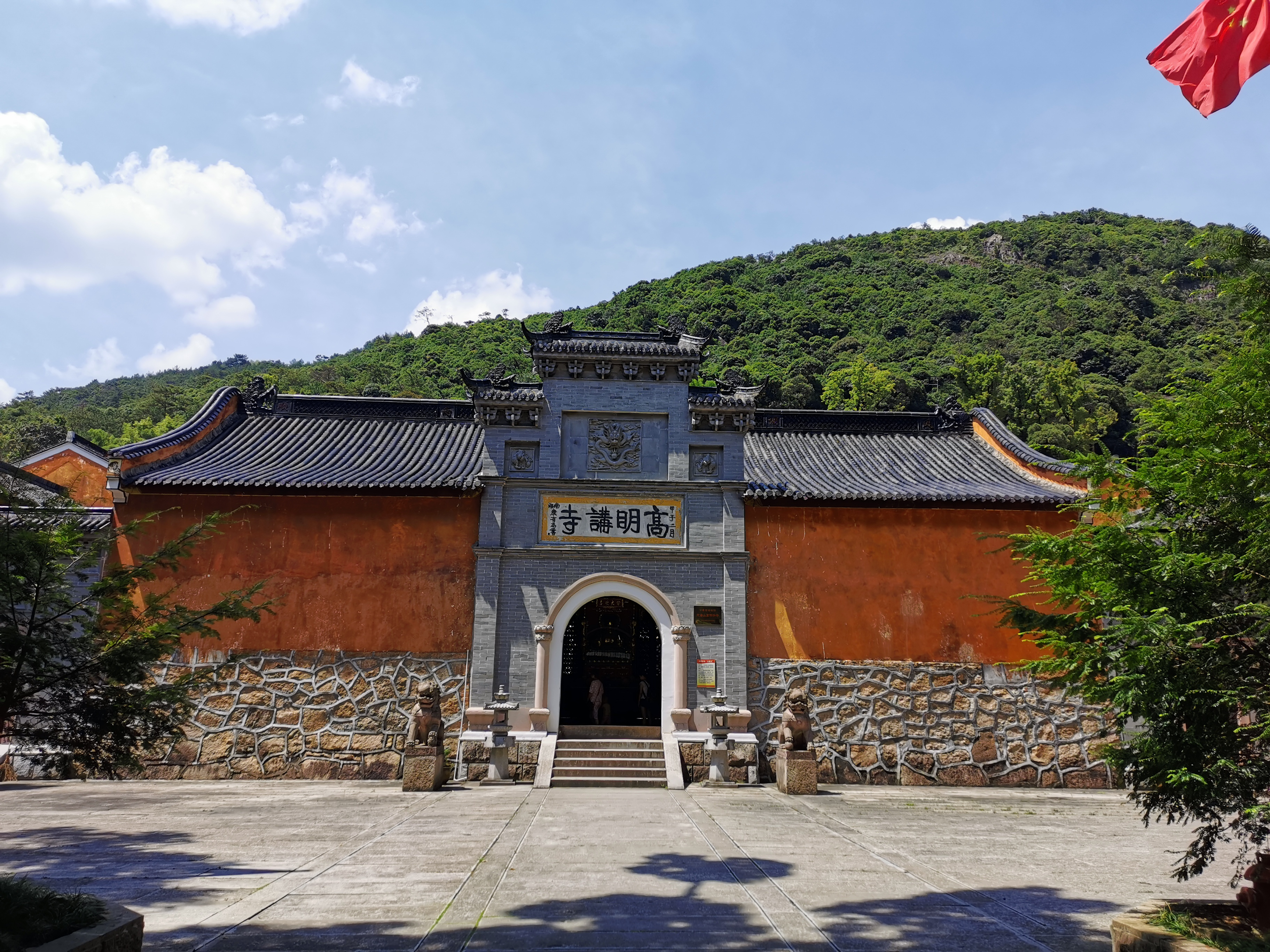
- The shanmen of Gaoming Temple.

- Location within Zhejiang

Religion
- Affiliation: Buddhism
- Sect: Tiantai

Location
- Location: Tiantai County, Zhejiang
- Country: China
- Coordinates: 29°11′56″N 121°04′10″E

Architecture
- Style: Chinese architecture
- Founder: Zhiyi
- Established: 6th century
- Completed: 1980 (reconstruction)

Gaoming Temple (Chinese: 高明寺; pinyin: Gāomíng Sì) is a Buddhist temple located in Tiantai County, Zhejiang, China. It is a traditional temple of Tiantai Buddhism.

== History ==
The temple traces its origins to the former "Youxi Daochang" (幽溪道场), founded by Tiantai master Zhiyi in the 6th century, and would later become the "Gaoming Temple" (高明寺) in the Tianyou period (904–907) of the Tang dynasty (618–907).

In 936, in the 3rd year of Qingtai period (934–936) in the Later Tang dynasty (923–937), the temple was renamed "Zhizhe Youxi Tayuan" (智者幽溪塔院)

In 1008, in the 1st year of Dazhong Xiangfu period in the Song dynasty (960–1279), the name was changed into "Jingming Temple" (净名寺).

In 1606, in the reign of Wanli Emperor (1573–1620) in the Ming dynasty (1368–1644), master Youxi Chuandeng (幽溪传灯, 1554-1628) became the abbot of the temple, which was in a state of total disrepair. He worked hard to reconstruct the temple and revive Tiantai Buddhism. With patronage from scholar-official Feng Kaizhi and lay devotee Zhao Hainan, Chuandeng led the reconstruction of the main halls, meditation quarters, and altars, commissioned new Buddha statues and carvings, and added 29 acres of temple land. To commend his contribution, he had been honored as "Rebirth of Zhiyi".

In 1926, abbot Guantong (观通) restored the Hall of Ksitigarbha, Drum tower and Hall of Four Heavenly Kings.

The modern temple was founded in 1980. In 1981, under the support of overseas Chinese Xia Jingshan (夏荆山) and Zhou Qinli (周勤丽), abbot Juehui (觉慧) refurbished and redecorated the temple.

Gaoming Temple has been designated as a National Key Buddhist Temple in Han Chinese Area by the State Council of China in 1983.

== Architecture ==
Along the central axis are the Shanmen, Four Heavenly Kings Hall, Mahavira Hall, Guanyin Hall and Buddhist Texts Library. There are over eight halls and rooms on both sides, including Guru Hall, Drum tower, Abbot Hall, Monastic Dining Hall, Monastic Reception Hall and Meditation Hall.

== Gallery ==
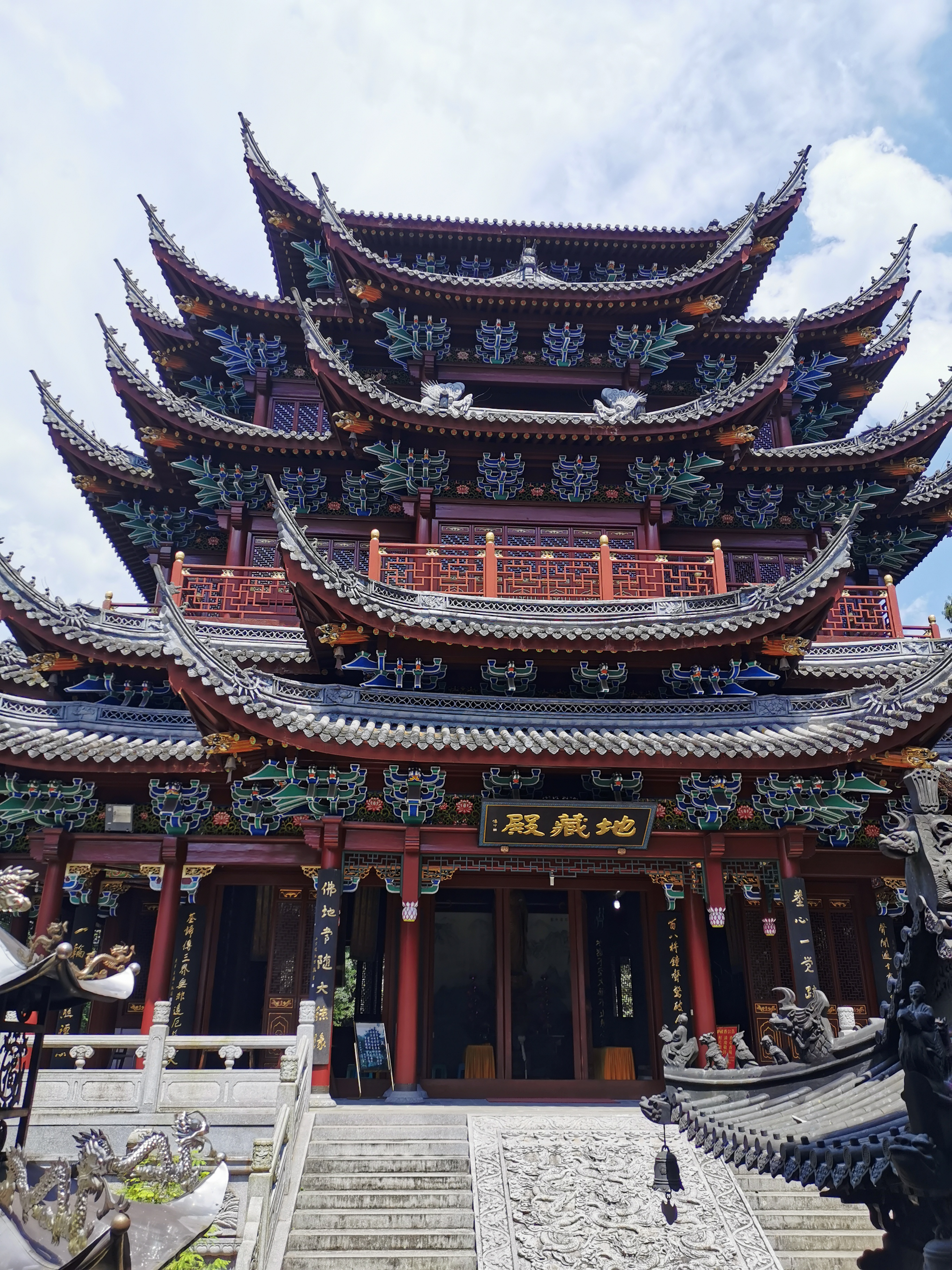
The Hall of Ksitigarbha at Gaoming Temple.

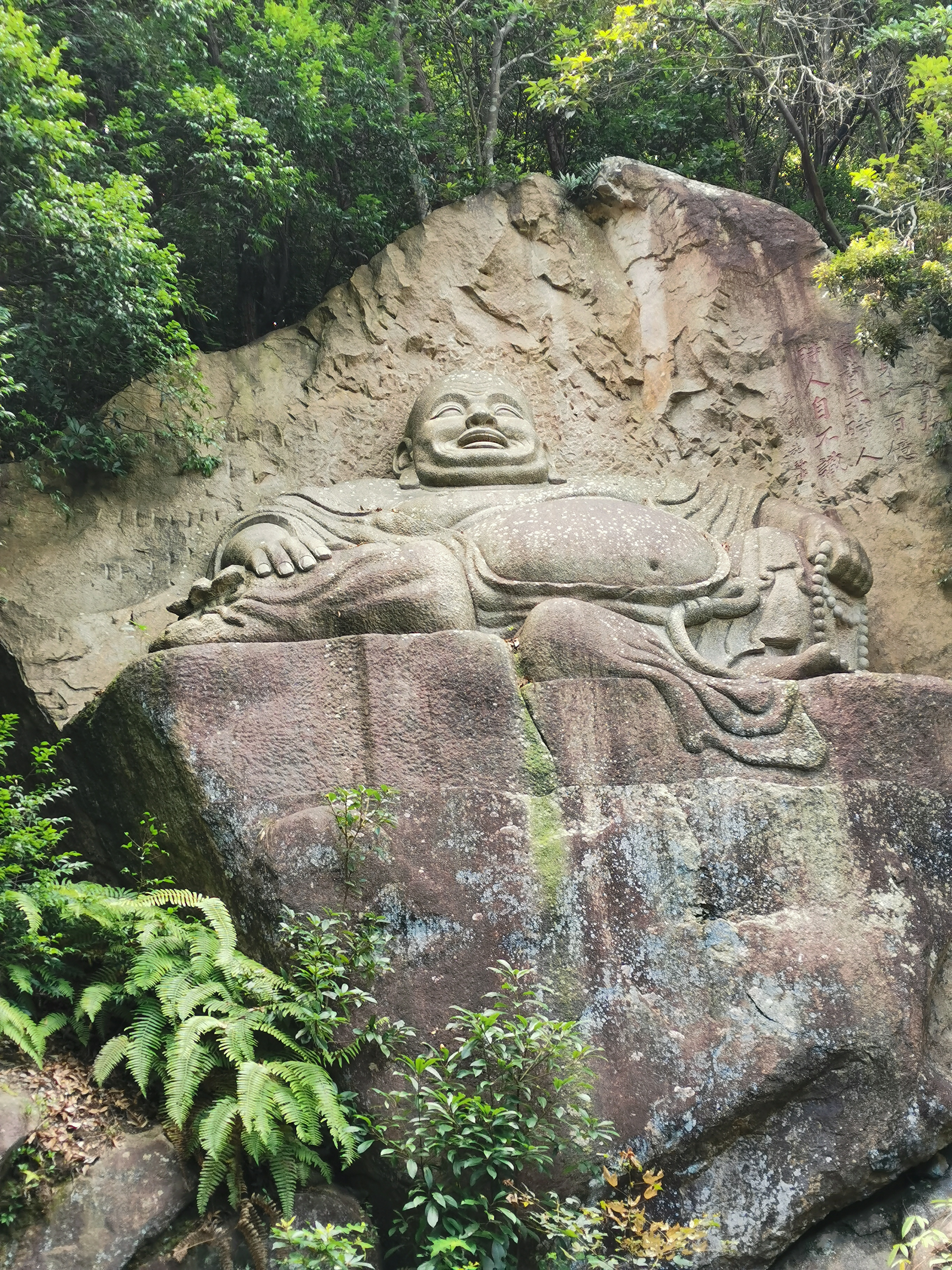
Stone carving of Maitreya in Gaoming Temple.

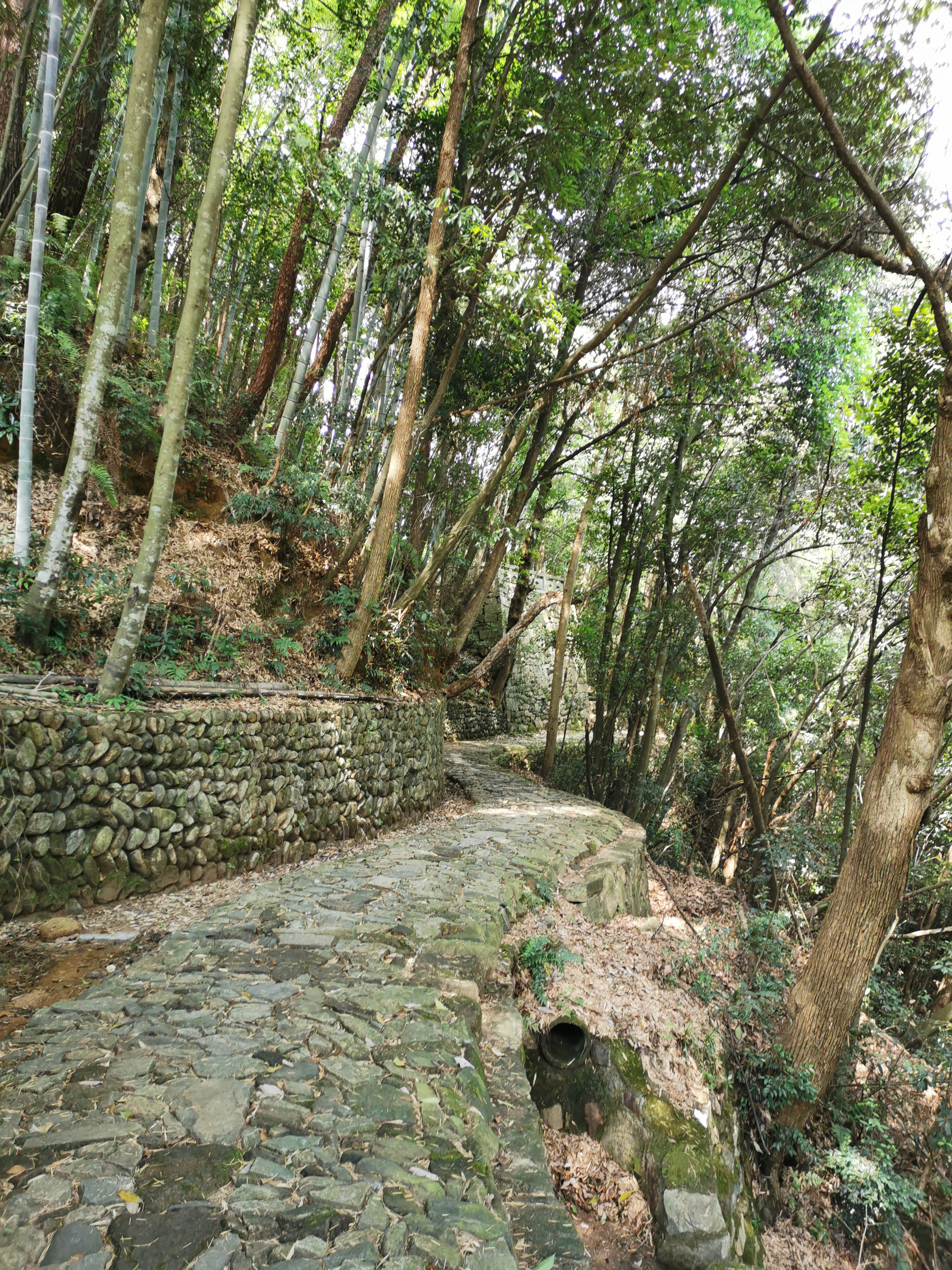
A stony path in front of Gaoming Temple.
