= Youxi Chuandeng =

Ming dynasty Chinese Buddhist monk and Thirtieth Tiantai Patriarch

Youxi Chuandeng (Traditional Chinese: 幽溪傳燈, Simplified Chinese: 幽溪传灯, 1554–1628) was a prominent Buddhist monk of the late Ming dynasty who played a central role in the revival of the Tiantai school of Chinese Buddhism at a time when its institutional presence and doctrinal influence had significantly declined. His contributions included exegetical scholarship, history and the reconstruction of Tiantai temples. For his efforts, he is known as “the patriarch who revived the Tiantai school during the Ming dynasty” and is traditionally regarded as the Thirtieth Patriarch of the Tiantai tradition.

Chuandeng's writings, such as his On Nature Including Good and Evil, provided Ming Tiantai with sophisticated philosophical underpinning. He also wrote extensively on the Śūraṅgama Sūtra, a work which was very popular in Ming Buddhism. Chuandeng was a student of Baisong Zhenjue, and a teacher of the eminent monk Ouyi Zhixu. He was commonly known as Youxi Heshang, Youxi Dashi, or Chuandeng Dashi.

== Life ==
Chuandeng, also known as Master Youxi, was a prominent Buddhist monk during the Ming Dynasty who played a pivotal role in revitalizing the Tiantai School. Born in 1554 in Xi’an County, Quzhou Prefecture (modern-day Quzhou, Zhejiang), his lay surname was Ye, and he was given the courtesy name Wujin and the Dharma name Youmen. Initially educated in Confucian classics, Chuandeng experienced a spiritual awakening after reading Longshu's Pure Land Essays, resolving to become a monk despite maternal objections. In 1579, aged 26, a severe illness prompted his mother's reluctant consent. He then entered monastic life at a young age, receiving ordination under Ying’an of Jinxian (Ying'an Zhufa), a Chan master who taught at Mount Tiantai. Chuandeng was deeply influenced by his Chan master's teachings, who recommended that he read the Anthology of Yongjia of the Chan School (Chanzong Yongjia ji 禪宗永嘉集), a Chan work which promoted the unity of Chan and the scriptures, and also contained Tiantai influences.

After the death of his Chan master, Chuandeng studied the Lotus Sūtra and Tiantai doctrine under Master Baisong Zhenjue at Tiantai Mountain's Folong Peak. He also studied the Śūraṃgama Sūtra and Laṅkāvatāra Sūtra. Baisong himself was originally a Chan monk, who had not been trained by a Tiantai master, but had studied Tiantai works extensively, especially the works of Zhili like the Miaozongchao. Chuandeng explained that this was because the school was mostly defunct at this time, writing: “if [the school] exists, then [we learn it from] people; if [the school does] not exist, then [we learn from] the books.” Baisong was often criticized and seen as rather odd by his Chan contemporaries for attempting to revive Tiantai, indicating that "the Tiantai in the late Ming was literally a newly revived school, controversial and vulnerable."

In 1582, while seeking clarification on the profound meaning of the Śūraṅgama Samādhi, Chuandeng experienced a sudden awakening upon observing his Master Baisong's intense gaze. Chuandeng then practiced the Śūraṃgama Samādhi extensively for five years, composing a commentary on the Śūraṃgama Sūtra afterwards. Recognizing his realization, Baisong conferred upon him a symbolic purple gold robe, marking his spiritual attainment and his succession to the Tiantai lineage. By 1587, Chuandeng had settled at Gaoming Temple on Mount Tiantai, where he reestablished the Tiantai ancestral lineage. There, he devoted himself to teaching disciples while integrating Chan and Pure Land practices, earning him the epithet "Master Youxi."

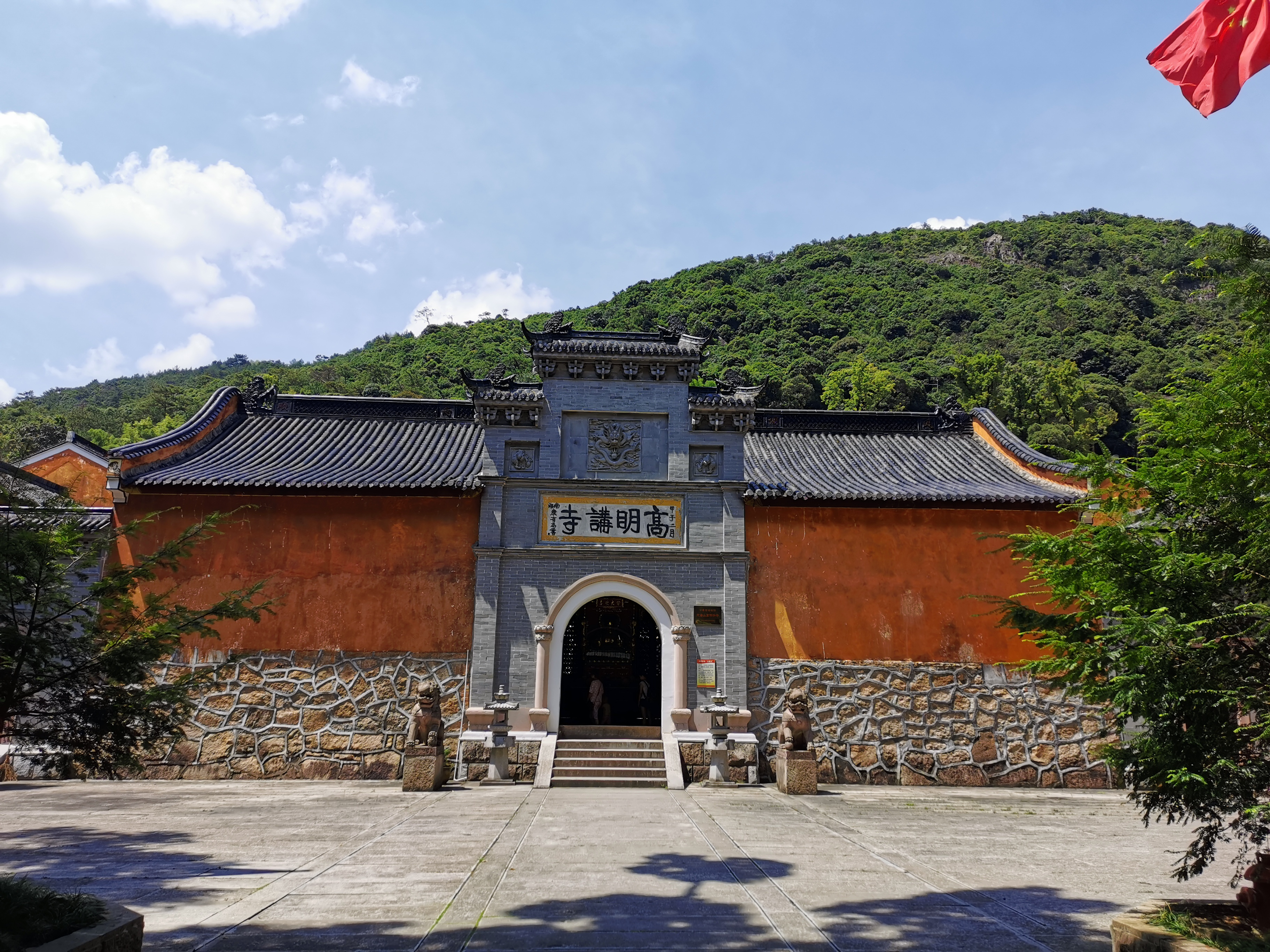
Entrance Gate (Shanmen) of Gaoming Temple

As abbot of Gaoming Temple, Chuandeng spearheaded its reconstruction, a task which continued throughout the rest of his life. Originally established by Tiantai patriarch Zhiyi as one of twelve mountain monasteries, Gaoming (then called Jingming) had declined during the Jiajing era (1522–1566) to the point where only stone sutra pillars remained. With patronage from scholar-official Feng Kaizhi, lay devotee Zhao Hainan, as well as aid from Tu Long and Wang Shixing, Chuandeng was able to reconstruct the halls, meditation quarters, and main altars, as well as commission new bronze statues (of Shakyamuni, Maitreya and Manjusri) and sandalwood carvings, and even acquire around 29 acres of temple land. He also personally travelled to Nanjing in 1612 to procure a complete Buddhist canon. He also constructed new additions to the site, like the Śūraṃgama Altar and the Never-blinking hall (a Pure Land focused hall).

Chuandeng was renowned for his eloquent lectures on topics like the Lotus Sūtra, the Śūraṃgama Sūtra and Zhili's Miaozongchao. From 1585 to 1625, Chuandeng lectured across Zhejiang and Jiangsu, delivering over 40 annual lecture series. Literary giant Tu Long praised him as "reviving Tiantai's lost traditions" and "worthy of succeeding Patriarch Zhiyi." A notable account describes an occasion at Shishan Temple in Xinchang, where, while expounding Buddhist doctrine before the Great Buddha statue, the entire assembly reportedly heard celestial music resounding in harmony with his discourse, ceasing only upon its conclusion.

Regarding his personal practice, Chuandeng was a rigorous practitioner of repentance rituals, particularly those based on the Lotus Sūtra, Great Compassion Dharani, Amitabha Sūtra, Śūraṅgama Sūtra, and others. Annually, he led his disciples in the "Four Kinds of Samādhi," demonstrating exceptional dedication. After constructing the Śūraṃgama Altar, Chuandeng devoted himself primarily to cultivating the Śūraṃgama Samādhi, employing the method of Guanyin known as "interpenetration through the ear faculty." In this practice, ten monastics would conduct repentance rituals and sit in meditation in an open area in front of the altar, which was restricted from general access. As per the Śūraṃgama Sūtra, Chuandeng also emphasized that strict adherence to precepts is essential for engaging in this form of practice. Each year, Chuandeng led a group of ten precept-observing monks in a one-hundred-day retreat. This intensive session was preceded by a twenty-one-day preparatory period involving rituals of repentance, prostrations, recitation of the Śūraṃgama mantra, walking meditation, and vow-making. The full retreat followed immediately thereafter. Wang Shichang (王士昌), a government official and scholar, documented this routine in a commemorative essay for Chuandeng's seventieth birthday. He noted that Chuandeng personally guided the retreat, staying awake for twenty-one days while performing walking meditation during all six periods of the day and night, then maintaining focused seated meditation until the retreat concluded. This annual retreat had reportedly been held without interruption since 1615, setting a lasting example for future generations.

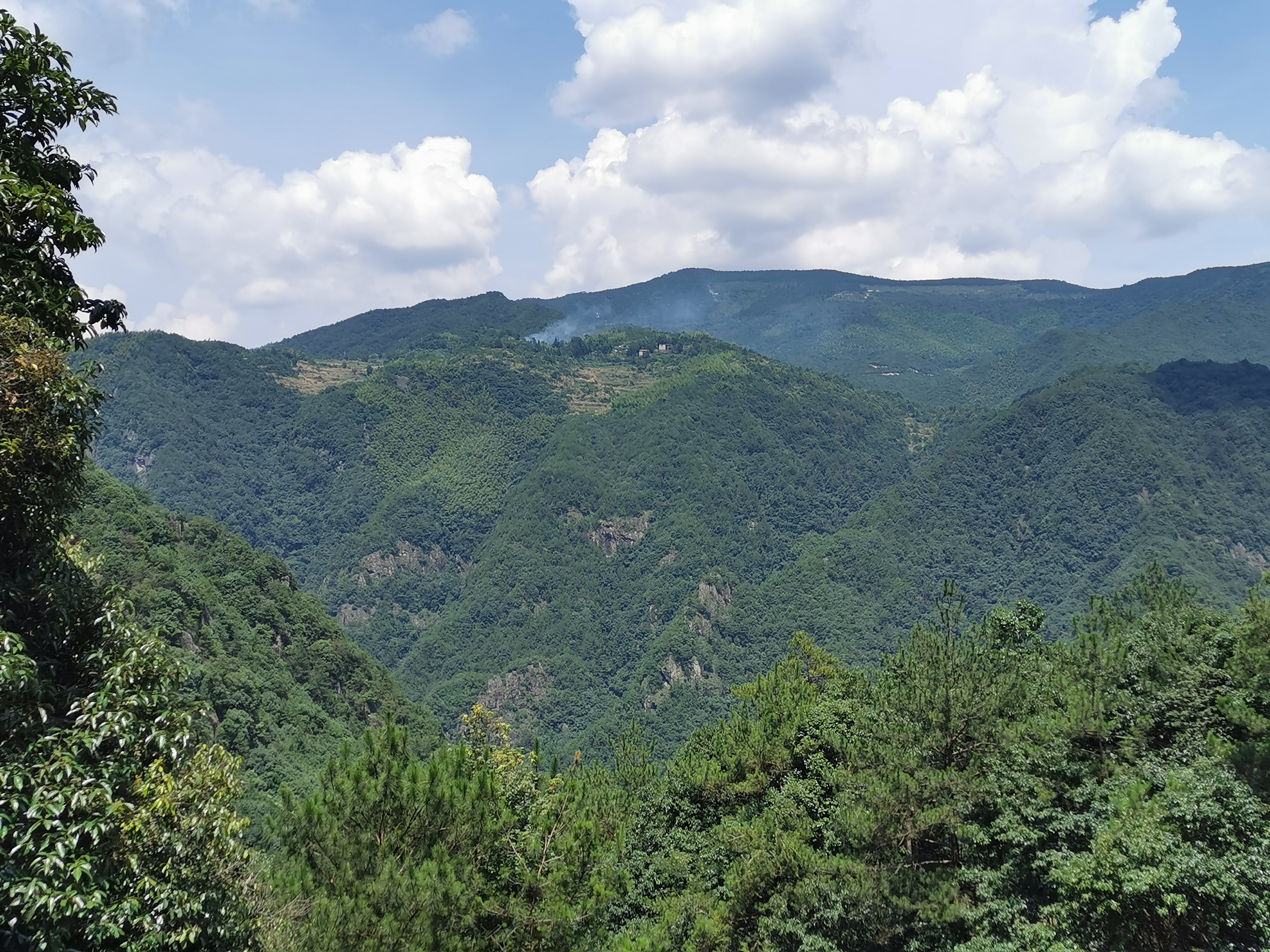
Gaoming Mountain

In addition to group retreats, Chuandeng also engaged in solitary meditation at a nearby location he called the “Interpenetration Cave” (圓通洞), where he contemplated the auditory sense by listening to natural sounds like streams and wind in the pines. This deepened his realization of the "interpenetration through the ear faculty," which he later expressed in verse. In his poem titled “Interpenetration Cave,” he described a continuous experience of that meditative state, and in “White Flower Hut,” he wrote of his awakening to the nature of interpenetration. These insights eventually informed his treatise, Commentary on the Interpenetration of the Śūraṃgama Sūtra. Chuandeng was also known for his lifelong commitment to strict precept observance. As part of an extended ritual, Chuandeng abstained from eating after noon and refrained from lying down at night during meditation. His teachings consistently emphasized the importance of moral discipline, for which he was widely respected not only as a teacher but as a model practitioner.

Youxi Chuandeng's revival of the Tiantai tradition had many dimensions, including historiographical reconstruction, doctrinal commentary and advocacy, temple construction and ritual innovation. All served to reestablish the legitimacy and authority of the Tiantai school during a time when its institutional and intellectual presence had nearly vanished. By writing new Tiantai works and expanding the lineage of patriarchs beyond Zhili, Chuandeng not only reinvigorated the school's identity but also won support among the literati, laying foundations for subsequent developments in the tradition. His work marks a turning point in the history of Chinese Tiantai Buddhism, showing how scriptural interpretation and lineage reconstruction could be used to secure institutional survival and assert religious orthodoxy in a pluralistic environment.

In 1628, Chuandeng died. In his last moments, he wrote down and chanted the title of the Lotus Sūtra, “Miaofa Lianhua Jing” 妙法蓮華經 (Wondrous Dharma Flower Sūtra). He died in the lotus position at the age of seventy-five years.

== Teachings ==
=== Context ===
By the Yuan and early Ming periods, Tiantai Buddhism had fallen into decline. The authoritative Comprehensive History of the Buddhas and Patriarchs (佛祖统纪) recognized Siming Zhili (960–1028) as the last acknowledged patriarch of the tradition, and thereafter the Tiantai lineage ceased to be maintained or updated in historical records. This decline is reflected in the testimony of the Ming literatus Feng Mengzhen (冯梦祯, 1548–1608), who lamented that although monasteries and monastics proliferated across the world, the Tiantai lineage had no successor, resulting in doctrinal confusion and the effective extinction of Tiantai teachings and contemplative practice.

In this context of doctrinal erosion, Youxi Chuandeng, like his contemporary Zhenjue, initially trained in the Chan tradition (i.e. Zen Buddhism). Chuandeng studied under the Chan master Ying’an (暎庵, 1546–1579), who advised him to study the Anthology of Yongjia of the Chan School (禅宗永嘉集), a work integrating Chan and Tiantai thought. This doctrinal hybridity, characteristic of late Ming Buddhism, was part of a larger syncretic trend that emphasized the unity of scriptural and meditative traditions, though interpretations of this syncretism varied widely.

Despite prevailing syncretic tendencies, Chuandeng and Zhenjue ultimately rejected Ming syncretism in favor of reaffirming the distinct identity and doctrinal supremacy of the Tiantai tradition. Their project was an attempt to reassert Tiantai orthodoxy. Against the background of a Chinese Buddhism inclined toward the fusion of the various particular Chinese Mahayana traditions, their approach was marked by a deliberate sectarian identity, treating Tiantai doctrine as the apex of the Buddha's teachings in their systems of doctrinal classification (panjiao).

=== Historiography ===
A key component of Chuandeng's project was the reconstruction of the Tiantai lineage. Faced with a context in which few monks or laypersons even recognized Tiantai discourse, Chuandeng sought to restore legitimacy and historical continuity to the tradition. He did this through textual historiography, compiling two major monastic gazetteers: Beyond the Secular World Gazetteer of Mt. Tiantai (《天台山方外志》) and Special Gazetteer of Youxi (《幽溪别志》).

In the former, he included a biographical history of Tiantai patriarchs from Nāgārjuna to Siming Zhili, thereby reestablishing a lineage model. In the latter, he extended the lineage to include Zhenjue as the eighteenth patriarch, thereby inserting his contemporary into the canonical succession. This act of lineage construction was not merely a historiographical gesture but also a strategy for asserting religious authority and attracting the support of the gentry class. Chuandeng's efforts paralleled similar attempts in the gentry, notably by Feng Mengzhen, who linked Zhenjue to Zhili in the same way that earlier Chinese Buddhists linked their masters to Nāgārjuna via Huiwen—through textual inheritance rather than direct transmission. This mode of lineage legitimation helped win converts among elite literati such as Tu Long (屠隆, 1543–1605), who came to regard Tiantai as equivalent in importance to Chan.

=== Inherent evil and mutual inclusion ===
Chuandeng's works, such as his mature Treatise on the Nature of Good and Evil (Xing shan e lun 性善惡論), defend and expand upon the Tiantai concept of "inherent evil," an important Tiantai doctrine since the Song Dynasty. This teaching, which was by this time considered a hallmark of Tiantai Buddhism, held that reality as it is, i.e. thusness (Skt. tathatā; Chi. zhenru 真如) contains "inherent badness" (xing'e 性惡), as well as inherent goodness (xing shan 性善). According to Chuandeng, the suffering (Skt. duḥkha) of everyday life is due to the function of this inherent badness found in all phenomena.

This teaching was ultimately founded on the central Tiantai doctrine of nature inclusion (性具), which was held to contain the entirety of Tiantai philosophy. The term “nature” here denotes the fundamental nature of all phenomena. The term “inclusion” (具, ju) is understood in two principal senses: the first is “inherent inclusion” (ben ju 本具), which indicates that all things are originally present within nature; the second is “mutual inclusion” (hu ju 互具), meaning that all phenomena simultaneously contain each other. The concept of “nature-inclusion” expresses the view that all things are both originally contained within nature and that they inter-contain one another without precedence or succession. This conception sharply contrasts with the Huayan school's theory of “nature-origination” (xing qi 性起), which posits that the pure nature is ontologically prior to all conditioned phenomena. Whereas Huayan sees the arising of things as a process that originates from an ontologically prior purity, Tiantai asserts a co-existence and interpenetration from the outset. These two doctrines represent divergent metaphysical frameworks that deeply influenced Chinese Buddhist thought.

Within the Tiantai system, among the several implications of “nature-inclusion,” the most striking is the claim that “Buddha-nature contains both good and evil.” What makes this view exceptional is the assertion that evil is not external or accidental to Buddha-nature but is originally and inherently included within it. The Nirvana Sūtra presents Buddha-nature as an all-pervasive nature found in all beings. Traditionally, Buddha-nature has been understood as the ultimate, non-dual reality characterized by absolute purity, transcending all dichotomies such as good and evil. In Tiantai however, Buddha-nature's non-dual nature is taken to include evil as well as good (since it includes all phenomena). Thus, Tiantai emphasizes the mutual inclusivity of all things and mind. It rejects the view that mind is a pre-existent purity distinct from conditioned phenomena. Instead, it asserts that the ten realms are inherently present within Buddha-nature and mutually contain one another. Thus, the evil associated with deluded beings and the goodness attributed to Buddhas are both inherent within Buddha-nature. Moreover, since all realms interpenetrate, it follows that Buddhas include the evil of beings, and sentient beings include the goodness of Buddhas.

Furthermore, Chuandeng also promoted the idea that the true nature, as the ultimate principle, also transcended good and evil as well as contained it:

As principle, nature is originally neither good nor evil. Those arguments that the ancient and contemporary thinkers consider [nature] as good or evil are no more than discussing nature through practice (xiu), illuminating principle (li) through phenomena (shi). It is just like seeking sound by following its echo and looking for form by following its shadow. Since nature is principle, how can good and evil be sufficient in describing it?

Relying on the Chinese concepts of principle/phenomena (li/shi), and essence/function (ti/yong), Chuandeng argues that while the ultimate principle is beyond good and evil, since it manifests as functions or phenomena which are themselves good or evil, then the ultimate principle or "nature" (xing) is also not separate from good and evil in "practice" (xiu). As such, the ultimate nature also includes good and evil even while transcending it. Thus, for Chuandeng:

When Tiantai speaks of nature, the good and the evil are included in it inherently. When speaking of practice, the good and the evil then become differentiated. Inherent good means that the Buddha-realm is originally included, while inherent evil means that the nine realms are originally included. When the Buddha-realm is fulfilled (manifested) through practice, it is cultivated good. When the nine realms are fulfilled through practice, it is cultivated evil.

=== Exegesis of the Śūraṃgama Sūtra ===
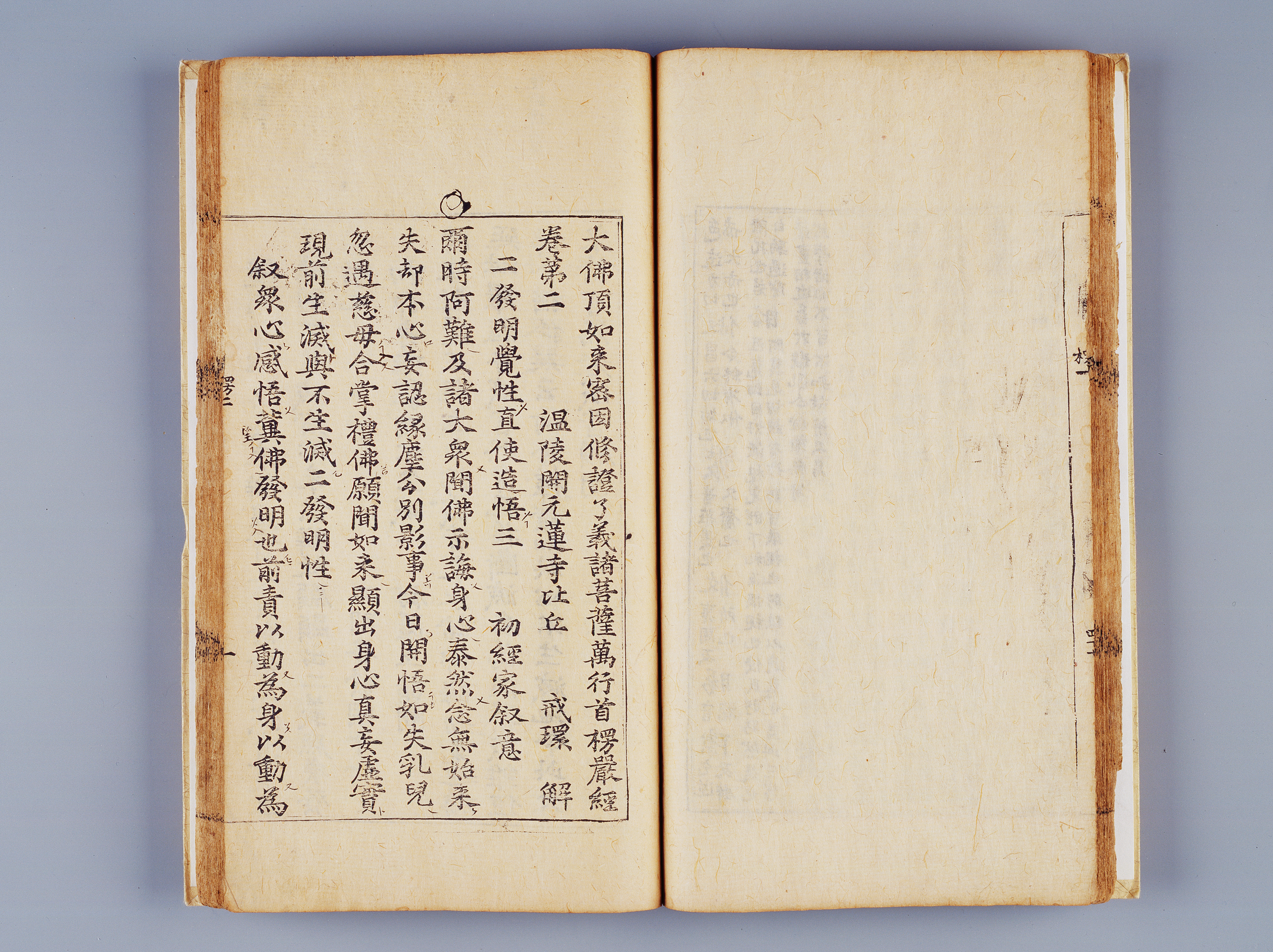
Chinese edition of the Śūraṅgama Sūtra, c. 1401 CE.

Chuandeng's most influential doctrinal contribution was his promotion and interpretation of the Śūraṃgama Sūtra (首楞嚴經, Shǒuléngyán jīng, Sūtra of the Heroic March) from a Tiantai perspective. In the late Ming, this scripture had gained widespread popularity among both monastics and the literati who saw it as a text that demonstrated the unity of Chan and the sutras. Chuandeng used this scripture and contemporary understandings of it to defend and propagate Tiantai teachings, especially the doctrines of mutual inclusion and "nature including good and evil." Chuandeng composed four major works on the Śūraṃgama Sūtra: The Profound Meaning of the Śūraṃgama Sūtra (楞严玄义), the Pre-Commentary on the Interpenetration of the Śūraṃgama Sūtra (楞严经圆通疏前茅), the Commentary on the Interpenetration of the Śūraṃgama Sūtra (楞严经圆通疏), and the Ritual Manual of Śūraṃgama Sūtra Ocean Seal Samadhi (楞严海印三昧仪). Chuandeng was also the first figure to establish a Śūraṃgama Altar and formalize a Śūraṃgama Sūtra based ritual practice based on both the sūtra's content and Tiantai liturgical methods, thereby further integrating the scripture into the Tiantai tradition.

Chuandeng argued that the Śūraṃgama Sūtra was not only compatible with Tiantai teachings and practices but that it also contained the essence of the Lotus Sūtra, Tiantai's supreme scripture. He specifically identified the Suramgama Samādhi (楞严大定) with Tiantai contemplation (zhiguan). Thus, Chuandeng wrote:

How the sutra speaks about the tathāgatagarbha is in accord with the essence of [Tiantai] nature-inclusion. How Tiantai speaks about the practice of Cessation and Contemplation (zhiguan 止觀) is secretly in accord with the essence of the Great Concentration [of the Śūraṃgama Sūtra]. Even when speaking about the different stages of the process for becoming a Buddha and how to prevent demonic states, in this, the Tiantai teachings are totally united with the Śūraṃgama Sūtra.

He also saw the sutra as containing the teachings of Pure Land and Chan. As Yungfen Ma writes: "Chuandeng saw that if one only contemplates one‟s own mind as the Buddha, it is no other than Chan practice. If one only contemplates the other Buddhas outside oneself, it is no other than Pure Land practice. If one contemplates both, it is dual practice." He identified this practice as being the same as the nianfo practice of Patriarch Zhiyi, which he explained as follows "while one is doing nianfo [as Dashizhi would], all the sense-organs and all their objects are everywhere in the Dharma-realm. Amitābha Buddha already appears inside one‟s mind. One‟s body already dwells inside the Pure Land." Furthermore, he also saw the Śūraṃgama as explaining the unity of the teachings of ethical precepts and Esoteric teachings with the rest of the Dharma. Indeed, he saw the sutra as proving the unity of all Buddhist schools.

Chuandeng's interpretation of the Śūraṃgama Sūtra combined the theories of Tiantai patriarchs like Zhili with the theory of the “pure mind” (qingjing xin 清淨心) found in the Śūraṃgama Sūtra. The teaching of the "pure mind" was common in Chan and Huayan, but had been critiqued by previous Tiantai figures, such as Zhili. Chuandeng's unique contribution to Tiantai thought was the integration of the pure mind doctrine with the Tiantai teachings of mutual inclusion and inherent evil.

=== Classification schema ===
A critical aspect of Chuandeng's work was doctrinal classification (panjiao), which, in Chinese Buddhist tradition, serves to establish sectarian legitimacy by ranking scriptures according to their perceived profundity and proximity to the Buddha's original intent. Many contemporaries classified the Śūraṃgama Sūtra as belonging to the highest class of scriptures, that of the Lotus and Nirvana sutras. Chuandeng strongly rejected this classification, opposing the views of earlier thinkers such as Changshui Zirui, the Off-mountain (山外) Tiantai exegetes Gushan Zhiyuan and Jingjue Renyue, as well as the late Ming Huayan master Jiaoguang Zhenjian. Instead, Chuandeng argued that the Śūraṃgama must be classified within the Vaipulya period, the phase where the Buddha begins to elevate Mahāyāna over Hīnayāna but has not yet delivered the ultimate teaching of the One Vehicle found in the Lotus Sūtra. This reclassification preserved the doctrinal primacy of the Lotus Sūtra while simultaneously granting the Śūraṃgama a special role within the Tiantai framework.

=== Integration of Pure Land and Tiantai Teachings ===
Chuandeng's Brief Explanation and Perfect Middle Commentary on the Amitabha Sūtra interpreted Pure Land doctrine through the lens of Tiantai's Perfect Teaching and the Middle Way. In its preface, he explained:

The Pure Land’s adornments are understood as wondrous existence (miaoyou), while single-minded recitation embodies true emptiness (zhenkong). Without true emptiness, one cannot realize the Pure Land’s wondrous existence; without wondrous existence, one cannot manifest the mind’s true emptiness. This is the inconceivable provisional—not mere partial truth; the true emptiness—not mere voidness. Uniting these two in practice actualizes the perfect middle, fulfilling the supreme non-dual path. Thus, this work is designated a commentary.

His Discourses on the Pure Land was highly regarded among Ming Dynasty Pure Land scholars for its doctrinal depth and practical guidance.

In his seventies, Chaundeng shifted his practice to focus on the Repentance Ritual of Amitābha Buddha (mituo chanfa 彌陀懺法). He also helped establish a Pure Land Lotus Society (lian she 蓮社) focused on Nianfo practice.

== Works ==
Chuandeng wrote numerous works. His most prolific period was after his construction of the Śūraṅgama altar, when he lived in Gaoming temple. During this period of his life, he published works almost every year.

Youxi Chuandeng's writings include:

- 《吳中石佛相好懺儀》** (*Wúzhōng Shí Fó Xiàng Hǎo Chàn Yí*) – *Repentance Ritual of the Stone Buddha's Auspicious Marks in Wu* (1 vol.)
- 《天台傳佛心印記註》** (*Tiāntāi Chuán Fó Xīn Yìn Jì Zhù*) – *Commentary on the Tiantai Transmission of the Buddha's Mind-Seal* (2 vol.)
- 《天台山方外志》** (*Tiāntāi Shān Fāng Wài Zhì*) – *Records of Tiantai Mountain's Monastic Community* (30 vol.)
- 《幽溪文集》** (*Yōuxī Wénjí*) – *Collected Works of Youxi* (12 vol.)
- 《幽溪別志》** (*Yōuxī Biézhì*) – *Supplementary Records of Youxi* (16 vol.)
- 《性善惡論》** (*Xìng Shàn È Lùn*) – *Treatise on the Nature of Good and Evil* (6 vol.)
- 《楞嚴經圓通疏》** (*Léngyán Jīng Yuántōng Shū*) – *Comprehensive Commentary on the Śūraṅgama Sūtra* (10 vol.)
- 《楞嚴經圓通疏前茅》** (*Léngyán Jīng Yuántōng Shū Qiánmáo*) – *Preliminary Notes on the Śūraṅgama Commentary* (2 vol.)
- 《楞嚴經玄義》** (*Léngyán Jīng Xuán Yì*) – *Profound Meaning of the Śūraṅgama Sūtra* (4 vol.)
- 《永嘉禪宗集註》** (*Yǒngjiā Chánzōng Jí Zhù*) – *Annotations on Yongjia's Chan Collection* (2 vol.)
- 《法華經玄義輯略》** (*Fǎhuá Jīng Xuán Yì Jí Lǜè*) – *Compendium of the Profound Meaning of the Lotus Sūtra* (1 vol.)
- 《淨土生無生論》** (*Jìngtǔ Shēng Wúshēng Lùn*) – *Treatise on the Pure Land and Birthlessness* (1 vol., Youxi Chuandeng)
- 《維摩經無我疏》** (*Wéimó Jīng Wú Wǒ Shū*) – *Commentary on the Vimalakīrti Sūtra from a Non-Self Perspective* (12 vol.)
- 《觀無量壽佛經圖頌》** (*Guān Wúliàng Shòu Fó Jīng Tú Sòng*) – *Illustrated Verses on the Contemplation of Amitāyus Sūtra* (1 vol.)
- 《阿彌陀經略解圓中鈔》(Āmítuó Jīng Lǜè Jiě Yuán Zhōng Chāo) – Brief Explanation and Commentary on the Amitabha Sūtra (2 vol.)
- 《 淨土生無生論》(Jingtu sheng wusheng lun) Treatise On the Rebirth as Non-birth in the Pure Land
- On Interpenetration Mind in the Diamond Sūtra (Bore Rongxin Lun 般若融心論)
- Commentary on the Record of Tiantai's Transmission of the Buddha's Mind-seal (Tiantai chuan fo xinyin ji zhu 天台傳佛心印記註) a commentary on Huaize‟s (fl.1310) work which tries to harmonize Tiantai and Chan.
- Commentary on Anthology of the Chan school of Yongjia

== Sources ==
- Ma, Yungfen 楔㯠剔 (Shi Jianshu 慳夳㧆). 2011. The Revival of Tiantai Buddhism in the Late Ming: On the Thought of Youxi Chuandeng (1554- 1628). Ph.D. diss., Columbia University.
