= Yunqi Zhuhong =

Ming dynasty Chinese Buddhist monk and Eighth Chinese Pure Land Patriarch

Grand Master (大師) Yunqi Zhuhong
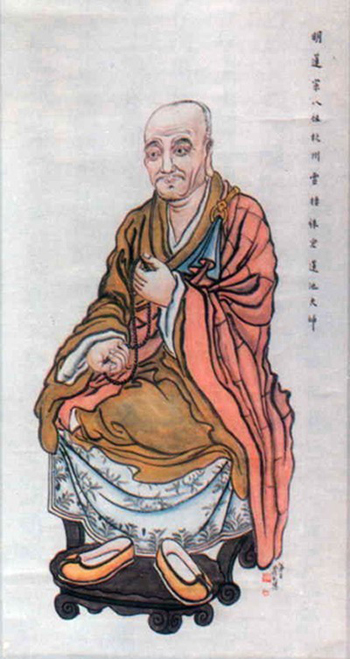
- A portrait of Yunqi Zhuhong

Personal life
- Born: 1535 Hangzhou, Zhejiang province, Ming empire
- Died: 1615 (aged 79–80)

Religious life
- Religion: Buddhism
- Lineage: Chinese Pure Land

Senior posting
- Teacher: Xueling

Yunqi Zhuhong (Chinese: 雲棲袾宏; pinyin: Yúnqī Zhūhóng; Wade–Giles: Chu Hung; 1535–1615), also widely known as Master Lianchi (Chinese: 蓮池大師; pinyin: Liánchí dàshī), was a Chinese Buddhist monk during the late Ming Dynasty. The name Yunqi derives from his monastic residence on Mount Yunqi (雲棲山) hence "Zhuhong of Yunqi [Mountain]", while Lianchi translates to "lotus pond". In Chinese Buddhism, Yunqi Zhuhong is best remembered as the Eighth Patriarch of the Pure Land tradition, and is known for his analysis of the Pure Land thought, and reconciling "mind-only" interpretations with more literal "Western Pure Land" interpretations. Along with his lay follower, Yuan Hongdao, Zhuhong wrote extensively on the Pure Land and defended its tradition against other Buddhist critics, while analyzing the Pure Land of Amitabha Buddha within the larger Buddhist context.

Zhuhong was also an avid editor of Buddhist liturgical texts, and he recodified the manuals of various rituals such as the Yujia Yankou rite and the Shuilu Fahui ceremony, which remain widely performed in contemporary Chinese Buddhism. Zhuhong's contributions also extend to the other Buddhist traditions besides Pure Land, such as Chan and Esoteric Buddhism, which is reflective of the historically non-sectarian nature of Chinese Buddhism. For instance, he wrote the Chan Whip Anthology (禪關策進; Chánguān Cèjìn), a survey of Chan Buddhist literature from the Tang dynasty to the Ming dynasty, which has served as a Chan handbook in both China and Japan since its publication in 1600. Another example is his recodification of the tantric Yujia Yankou rite, where he incorporated and made commentary regarding various esoteric Buddhist material, including the offering of a maṇḍala during the rite and the invocation or presence of various esoteric deities such as the maṇḍala of the Thirty-seven Deities (三十七尊; Sānshíqī zūn) in the Diamond Realm. He was also recorded as having performed the rite himself numerous times. Furthermore, Yunqi Zhuhong rebuilt the local monastery on Mount Yunqi, and earned a reputation as a reformer and disciplinarian.

In contemporary western sources, Yunqi Zhuhong is also remembered for his rebuttal to Roman Catholicism, with his writings a direct rebuttal to the Jesuit Matteo Ricci (利瑪竇).

== Biography ==
Yunqi Zhuhong was born in 1535 in Hangzhou Province into a well-educated family with the surname Shen. Zhuhong was reportedly an excellent student, and passed the first level of the Imperial civil-service exams, and continued studying to the age of 32. However, Zhuhong did not pass any further exams. His first encounter with Buddhism, especially the Pure Land tradition, reputedly began after he heard his neighbor intoning the nianfo.

After series of personal misfortunes, starting with the death of his infant son, followed by his wife, other family losses, and failure to advance any further in the civil-service exams, Zhuhong took up the monastic life in 1566. His second wife took up lay Buddhist precepts in support. One story recounts how Zhuhong, after seeing a teacup fall and shatter, pondered the intransience of life, and decide then and there to become a monk.

By 1571, after several years of traveling and studying under one teacher or another, Zhuhong returned to his native province and started residing on Mount Yunqi (雲棲山). Earlier, during the Song dynasty (960–1279), the monk Zhifeng (志逢; 909–985) was said to have been famous for living on the mountain and taming the region's infamously populous tigers, which earned him the title of "Tiger-taming Chan Master" (伏虎禪師; pinyin: Fúhǔ Chánshī). A monastery known as Yunqi Temple (雲棲寺; pinyin: Yúnqī sì) was built on the mountain for Zhifeng in 967 by Qian Liu, the founding king of Wuyue (907–978), but it had fallen into ruin by the time Zhuhong arrived to reside on the mountain in 1571. According to sources, the area was still infested with tigers which often attacked the local villagers. To curb the attacks without killing the tigers, Zhuhong led a pacification ceremony for five days and nights where monks were instructed to perform twelve complete sessions of the Repentance Ritual of the Emperor of Liang (梁皇懺法; pinyin: Liánghuáng Chànfǎ) as well as conduct the Yujia Yankou rite (瑜伽燄口; pinyin: Yújiā Yànkǒu; lit: "Yoga Flaming Mouth Food Bestowal Rite") to pacify the tigers, after which the attacks subsided. Another famous account mentions an incident when, during a year where severe drought struck the area, the local villagers petitioned Zhuhong for help in praying for rain. When Zhuhong replied that he did not know any rain-making magic and only knew the nianfo, the villagers insisted. Unable to refuse, Zhuhong went out, reciting the nianfo and striking a wooden fish while walking through the fields, whereupon rain began to fall wherever he passed. Records mention other similar feats by Zhuhong, including an instance in 1588 when he managed to lift a plague that had struck Hangzhou after being invited by the magistrate Yu Liangshu (余良樞) to Lingzhi Temple (靈芝寺) to perform a ritual to avert calamity.

Due to his miraculous interventions for the benefit of the local community, Zhuhong eventually restored Yunqi Temple with local sponsorship and assumed leadership of the local religious community. Due to his educated background, he assisted when official matters required someone who could speak Mandarin Chinese, and developed a network of gentlemen who sought his advice on spiritual matters as well.

== Pure Land Writings ==
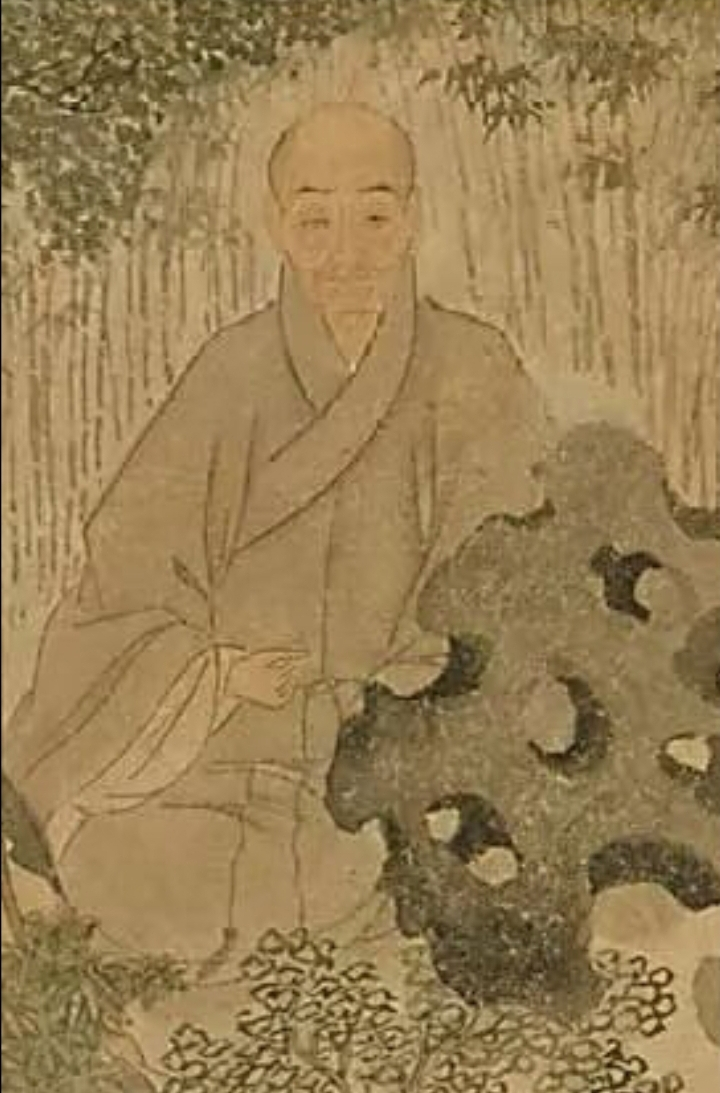
Portrait of Yunqi Zhuhong with a scholar's stone.

Yunqi Zhuhong wrote extensively on the Pure Land Buddhist tradition both to defend it from criticism from other Buddhist institutions (primarily Chan), and to explore and clarify the teachings more.

For example, in his commentary on the Amitabha Sutra, Zhuhong wrote on the phenomenal aspect of the Pure Land, and how at the highest level, the awakened mind sees the Pure Land as it really is. In so doing, Zhuhong attempted to reconcile the more traditional "Western-direction" view of the Pure Land with the more "mind-only" position frequently espoused by Chan Buddhist institutions.

In addition, in his Dá Jìngtǔ Sìshíbā Wèn (答浄土四十八问; 答淨土四十八問; 'Answers to Forty Eight Questions about the Pure Land') (CBETA X.1158), Zhuhong teaches, for example, the importance of the nianfo in establishing a "resonance" with the Buddha Amitabha which leads to a mutual effect that leads to rebirth in the Pure Land. In additional to a strict, disciplined lifestyle, Zhuhong advocates the verbal form of the nianfo in particular due to the declining Age of the Dharma.

== Teachings ==
Zhuhong's teachings and writings sought to reconcile various strands and interpretations of Pure Land Buddhist practice by using the concepts of principle (理; lǐ) and phenomena (事; shī) to distinguish between Amitabha Buddha as a non-dualistic, "mind-only" concept, and Amitabha Buddha as a literal Buddha in the western Pure Land. Zhuhong felt that Pure Land Buddhism is flexible enough to account for both interpretations, depending on one's personal interpretation.

For Zhuhong, the ultimate goal of Pure Land Buddhism was to attain samadhi focused on Amitabha Buddha, realizing that the Buddha was one's own mind:

To contemplate the Buddha (nianfo) is to contemplate the mind (nian-xin). Birth there (in the Pure Land) does not entail birth away from here. Mind, Buddha, and sentient beings are all of one substance; the middle stream (non-duality) does not abide on the two banks (this world and the Pure Land).

For example, the practice of reciting the nianfo works in either context, Zhuhong wrote, since a literal interpretation of reciting the nianfo would lead one to be reborn in the Pure Land, while in a mind-only context, reciting the nianfo would lead to a focused, "unperturbed mind". However, Zhuhong felt that either interpretation was valid, and would ultimately lead toward Enlightenment. However, Zhuhong was more critical toward an excessive bias toward a "mind-only"/principle interpretation as it could lead to hubris and arrogance.

In addition to recitation of the nianfo, Zhuhong also advocated other mainstream Buddhist practices such as chanting of the Buddhist sutras, upholding the Buddhist vows such as the five precepts, studying Buddhist teachings, practicing compassion including vegetarianism, and so on.

== Opposition to Catholicism ==
Yunqi Zhuhong was among the first of a growing rebuttal to the influence of Catholicism in Chinese society, starting with a short work, the Tianshuo siduan (天说四端; 天說四端; 'Four Essays on Heaven'), in 1615, five years after the death of Matteo Ricci. Zhuhong's polemic coincided with the political appointment of Shen Que (沈隺, d. 1624) as vice minister of rites in Nanking (Nanjing) and his initiation of an anti-Catholic campaign from official circles in 1616.

In the Zhuchuang suibi (竹窗随笔; 竹窗隨筆; 'Jottings under a Bamboo Window'), published in three sections: the Chubi (初笔), Erbi (二笔) and the Sanbi (三笔), he describes Matto Ricci as follows:

Though he worships the Lord of Heaven, in reality he has no conception of Heaven. . . . According to him the Lord of Heaven is a being without form, without color or sound. One can then only conclude that Heaven is nothing more than [pure] reason. But how can [pure reason] rule its subjects, or promulgate laws, or reward and punish? He [Ricci] may be an intelligent person, but he has never learned the scriptures of Buddhists; what could be expected but that his doctrine would be wrong.

== Articles ==
- Carpenter, Bruce, E. "Buddhism and the Seventeenth Century Anti-Catholic Movement in China", Tezukayama University Review (Tezukayama Daigaku Ronshu), no. 54, 1986, pp. 17–26. ISSN 0385-7743
- Yu Chun-fang in Goodrich and Fang ed., Dictionary of Ming Biography, Columbia University Press, New York, 1976, vol. 1, 322–324. ISBN 0-231-03801-1
