= Tongwadian =

Tongwadian (simplified Chinese: 铜瓦殿; traditional Chinese: 銅瓦殿; pinyin: Tóngwǎdiàn), may refer to:

- Tongwadian (Dali), on Mount Jizu, in Dali, Yunnan, China
- Guangzong Temple (Mount Wutai), more commonly known as the Tongwadian, on Mount Wutai, in Taihuai Town of Wutai County, Shanxi, China
