= Śūraṅgama Mantra =

Popular Buddhist mantra in East Asian Buddhism

Illustration of the Śūraṅgama Mantra's "Heart Mantra" (hṛdaya): Oṃ anale anale viśade viśade vīra vajradhare bandha bandhani vajrapāṇi phaṭ hūṃ trūṃ phaṭ svāhā.

The Śūraṅgama Mantra (Chinese: 楞嚴咒, Lèngyán zhòu; Japanese: 楞厳呪, Ryōgon shu; Vietnamese: Chú Lăng Nghiêm; Korean: 능엄주, Neung-eom ju), also known as the Sitātapatroṣṇīṣa Dhāraṇī, is a dhāraṇī or long mantra of Buddhist practice in East Asian Buddhism. Although relatively unknown in modern Tibet, there are several Śūraṅgama Mantra texts in the Tibetan Buddhist canon. It has strong associations with the Chinese Chan Buddhist tradition.

The mantra was, according to the opening chapter of the Śūraṅgama Sūtra (首楞嚴經, lit: "Sūtra of the Heroic March", T19n0945), historically transmitted by Gautama Buddha to Manjushri to protect Ananda before he had become an arhat. It was again spoken by the Buddha before an assembly of monastic and lay adherents. Like the popular six-syllable mantra "Om mani padme hum" and the Nīlakaṇṭha Dhāraṇī, the Śūraṅgama Mantra is synonymous with practices of Avalokiteśvara, an important Bodhisattva in both East Asian Buddhism and Tibetan Buddhism. The Śūraṅgama Mantra also extensively references Buddhist deities such as Sitātapatrā, Vajrapāṇi, Mahākāla, the Five Buddha Families headed by the Five Tathāgatas (such as Mahāvairocana), and Bhaiṣajyaguru. It is often used for protection or purification, as it is often recited as part of the daily morning session in monasteries.

The Śūraṅgama Mantra is well-known and popularly chanted during daily liturgical services in many East Asian Buddhist traditions, where it is very much related to the practice of the dhāraṇī of Sitātapatrā (Chinese: 大白傘蓋陀羅尼, pinyin: Dàbái sǎngài tuóluóní, lit: "White Parasol Dhāraṇī"). In Tibetan Buddhism, it is the "White Umbrella" (Wylie: gdugs dkar)..

== Background ==
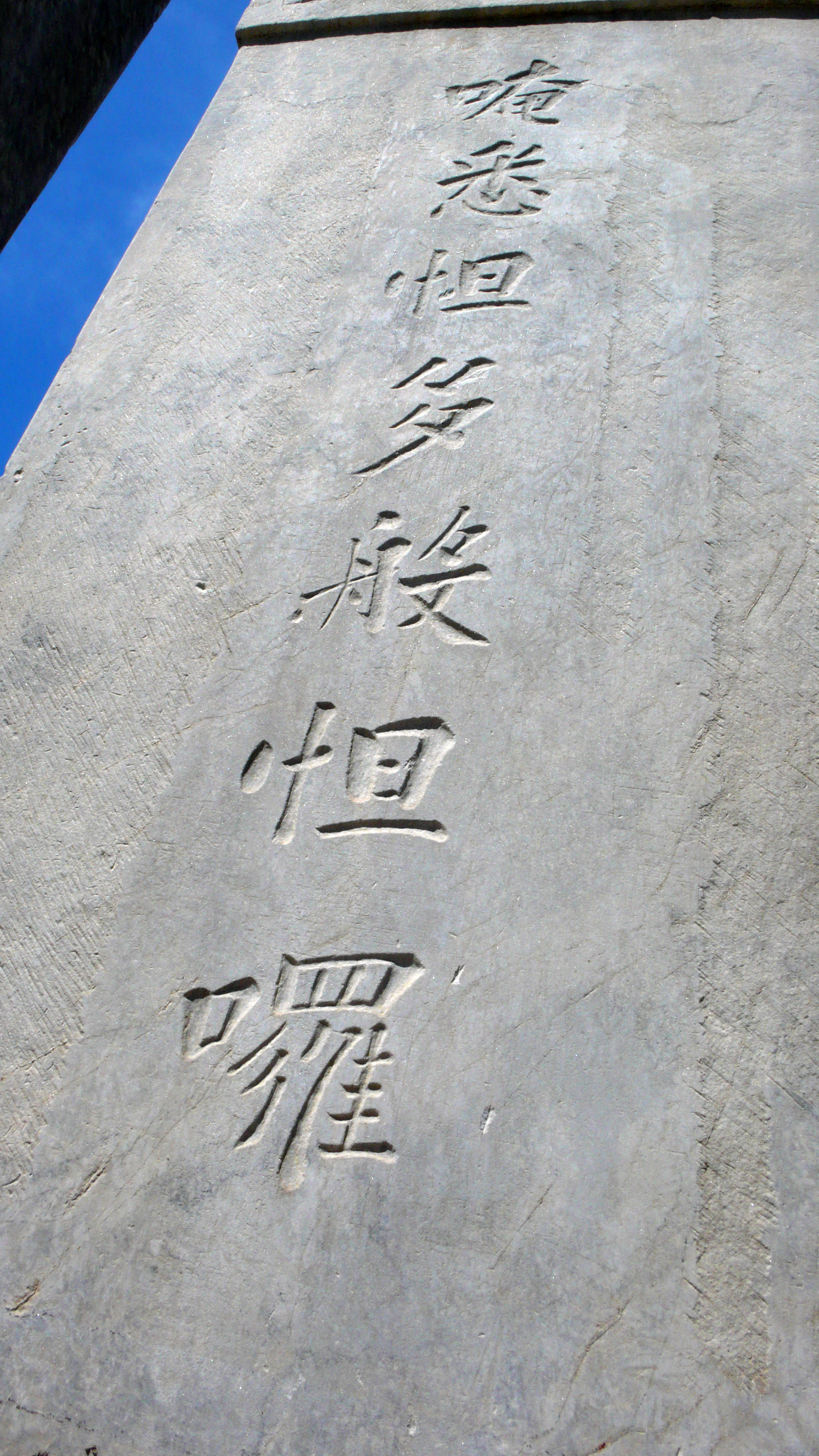
The Chinese words An xi dan duo bo da la (唵悉怛多缽怛囉), or Om Sitātapatrā in Sanskrit, on a stele at Beijing Rock Carving Art Museum. Xi dan duo bo da la is frequently referred to as the heart or core of the mantra in Chinese Buddhist practice.

=== Chinese translation ===
An original Sanskrit version of the Śūraṅgama Sūtra is not known to be extant. A Sanskrit language palm leaf manuscript consisting of 226 leaves with 6 leaves missing which according to the introduction "contains the Śūraṅgama Sūtra" was discovered in a temple in China and now resides at Peng Xuefeng Memorial Museum. But scholars have not yet verified if this is the same text or some other sūtra (like the Śūraṅgama Samadhi Sūtra).

The first catalogue that recorded the Śūraṅgama Sūtra was Zhisheng (Chinese: 智昇), a monk in Tang dynasty (618–907) China. Zhisheng said this book was brought back from Guangxi to Luoyang during the reign of Emperor Xuanzong. He gave two seemingly different accounts in two different books, both of which were published in 730 CE.

1. According to the first account found in the Kaiyuan shijiao lu (Chinese: 開元釋教錄, lit: "The Kaiyuan Era Catalog of the Buddhist Tripitaka", T55n2156) the Śūraṅgama Sūtra was translated in 713 CE by a Ven. Master Huai Di (Chinese: 懷迪) and an unnamed Indian monk. An official envoy to the south then brought the sūtra to the capital of Chang'an. (Note: The Kaiyuan Era Catalog of the Buddhist Tripitaka said, "Venerable Huai Di (Chinese: 懷迪), a native of Xún zhōu (循州) [located in parts of today's Guangdong], lived in Nanlou Monastery (南樓寺) on Mount Luofu (羅浮山). Mount Luofu is where many ṛsi lived and visited. Ven. Huai Di studied Buddhist sutras and sastras for a long time, and achieved profound erudition. He was also proficient in a wide range of knowledge. Here close to the coast, there are many Indian monks who come here. Ven. Huai Di learned how to say and read their language with them. When Mahāratnakūṭa Sūtra was translated to Chinese, Bodhiruci invited Huai Di to verify the translation. After the translation was finished, he returned to his hometown. Once he came to Guangzhou, he met a monk, whose name was unrecorded, from India with a Sanskrit book. He asked Huai Di to translate this book, a total of ten volumes, which was Shurangama Sutra. Ven. Huai Di wrote this book and modified the wording. After the book was translated, the monk left, and no one knows where he went. An official went to southern China, bringing this book back, so it became known here."《開元釋教錄》：「沙門釋懷迪，循州人也，住本州羅浮山南樓寺。其山乃仙聖遊居之處。迪久習經論，多所該博，九流七略，粗亦討尋，但以居近海隅，數有梵僧遊止；迪就學書語，復皆通悉。往者三藏菩提流志譯寶積經，遠召迪來，以充證義。所為事畢，還歸故鄉。後因遊廣府遇一梵僧 (未得其名) ， 齎梵經一夾，請共譯之，勒成十卷，即《大佛頂萬行首楞嚴經》是也。迪筆受經旨，緝綴文理。其梵僧傳經事畢，莫知所之。有因南使，流經至此。」) (Note: In 706 CE, Mahāratnakūṭa Sūtra began translation. HuaiDi was invited to Luoyang. The translation was finished in 713 CE. HuaiDi then went back to his hometown. The Shurangama Sutra was translated after 713 CE.)
2. According to the second account, in his later book Xu gujin yijing tuji (續古今譯經圖記, lit: "Continuation to the History of the Translation of Buddhist Sūtras Mural Record", T55n2152), the Śūraṅgama Sūtra was translated in May 705 CE by Śramaṇa Pāramiti from central India, who came to China and brought the text to the province of Guangzhou. The text was then polished and edited by Empress Wu Zetian's former minister, court regulator, and state censor Fang Yong (Chinese: 房融) of Qingho. (Note: The mention of Fang Yong poses a chronological problem. According to the Old Book of Tang Fang Yong was put in prison in January 705 CE because he was involved in a court struggle. He was then exiled from Luoyang to Guangxi Qinzhou in February, where he died.(舊唐書》卷七中宗紀云：「神龍元年正月…鳳閣侍郎韋承慶，正諫大夫房融，司禮卿韋慶等下獄……二月甲寅…韋承慶貶高要尉，房融配欽州。」《新唐書》〈中宗紀〉：「神龍元年二月甲寅......貶韋承慶為高要尉，流房融於高州。」新唐書卷139房琯傳：「父融，武后時以正諫大夫同鳳閣台平章事。神龍元年貶死高州。」《通鑑》卷208神龍元年：「二月乙卯正諫大夫同平章事房融除名流高州。」) If the book was translated at 705 CE, the cooperation of Fang Yong might be doubtful. If the text was translated in 713 CE, Fang Yong had no chance to aid in the translation of the text, since he died in 705. The translation was reviewed by Śramaṇa Meghaśikha from Oḍḍiyāna, and certified by Śramaṇa Huai-di (Chinese: 懷迪) of Nanlou Monastery (南樓寺) on Mount Luofu (羅浮山). Again, an official envoy to the south brought a copy of the sūtra to Chang'an. The Continuation to the History of the Translation of Buddhist Sutras Mural Record said, "Śramaṇa Pāramiti, which is means Quantum, came from Central India. He travel, missionary, arrived china. He stayed at Guangxiao Temple in Guangxi. Because he was very knowledgeable, so many people came to visit him. To help people, so he determined not to keep secret. in May 23 705 CE, He recited a Tantras, which is The Sūtra on the Śūraṅgama Mantra Spoken from Above the Crown of the Great Buddha's Head, and on the Hidden Basis of the Tathagata's Myriad Bodhisattva Practices Leading to Their Verification of the Ultimate Truth. Śramaṇa Meghaśikha from Oḍḍiyāna translated it to Chinese. Fang Yong(Chinese: 房融) of Qingho, the former minister, court regulator, and state censor, wrote it down. Śramaṇa Huai-di (Chinese: 懷迪) of Nanlou Monastery (南樓寺) on Mount Luofu (羅浮山) verify it. After teach it all, he came back to his country. An official went to southern China, bringing this book back, so we see it here."(《續古今譯經圖記》：「沙門般刺蜜帝，唐云極量，中印度人也。懷道觀方，隨缘濟度，展轉游化，達我支那。(印度國俗呼廣府為支那名帝京為摩訶支那) 乃於廣州制旨道場居止。眾知博達，祈请亦多。利物為心，敷斯秘賾。以神龍元年龍集乙巳五月己卯朔二十三日辛丑，遂於灌頂部中誦出一品名《大佛頂如来密因修證了義、諸菩薩萬行首楞嚴經》一部（十卷）。烏萇國沙門彌迦釋迦（釋迦稍訛，正云鑠佉，此曰雲峰）譯語，菩薩戒弟子、前正諫大夫、同中書門下平章事、清河房融筆受，循州羅浮山南樓寺沙門懷迪證譯。其僧傳經事畢，汎舶西歸。有因南使，流通於此。」))

According to Jia Jinhua, who studied and cross-referred a number of external documents related to both accounts that Zhisheng gave, the two accounts do not conflict but rather complement each other, with the Kaiyuan shijiao lu written first and the Xu gujin yijing tuji written later once Zhisheng had acquired more details about the sūtra's translation and transmission. According to Jia, the two accounts derive from two versions of the sūtra that were in circulation.

Jia states that the first version brought from Guangzhou to Chang'an, which was included in the Kaiyuan catalogue and is extant in the Fangshan stone canon, listed the translators as Huaidi and an Indian monk and was the source for the account provided in the Kaiyuan shijiao lu. He infers that the reason this version omitted Fang Rong's name is because, at the time of the translation in 705, he was a disgraced and banished official in exile. The reason for this exile was that on 20 February 705, Zhang Yizhi (張易之) and Zhang Changzong (張昌宗), two brothers who were Empress Wu’s favoured courtiers were killed in a coup, and Fang Rong was imprisoned for his close association with the Zhang brothers before being exiled to Gaozhou on 4 March. Song dynasty (960–1279) records by the monk Zuxiu (祖琇) recorded that Fang Rong arrived in Guangzhou in the fourth month and was invited by the Prefect of Guangzhou to take part in translating the Śūraṃgama Sūtra. The Tang court soon offered pardons to officials implicated in the affair involving the Zhang brothers, issuing amnesties and summoning officials back to court from the winter of 705 to the spring of 707, but Fang Rong unfortunately died in exile in Gaozhou. Jia then infers that Zhisheng's second account was based on a second version brought from Guangzhou to Chang'an by an official envoy at later time. Jia reasons that, by then, the reason for Fang Rong's exile had been pardoned, so there was no more taboo on signing his name on the sūtra, hence the second version lists in full the transmitter and translator of the sūtra, including Fang Rong as the transcriber and Huaidi as the verifier of the Sanskrit meanings. This version is supported by detailed accounts of the same events and attributions from a commentary of the Śūraṅgama Sūtra by the monk Weique (惟慤), who was personally introduced to the sūtra by Fang Rong's family during a meal at their house. Extracts of Weique's commentary with regards to the authorship of the sūtra is cited by the Japanese monk Genei (玄叡) in his work, the Daijō sanron daigi shō (大乘三論大義鈔, lit: "Digest of Major Doctrines of Mahāyāna Three Treatises", T70n2296), and the details regarding how he was introduced to the sūtra is cited by the Song dynasty monk Zanning^{[zh]} (贊寧) in his historical work, the Song gaoseng zhuan (宋高僧傳, lit: "Biographies of Eminent Monks of the Song dynasty", T50n2061). This second version was then included in a later catalogue of Buddhist scriptures called the Zhenyuan catalogue, and is extant in various later Buddhist canons.

=== Practice ===
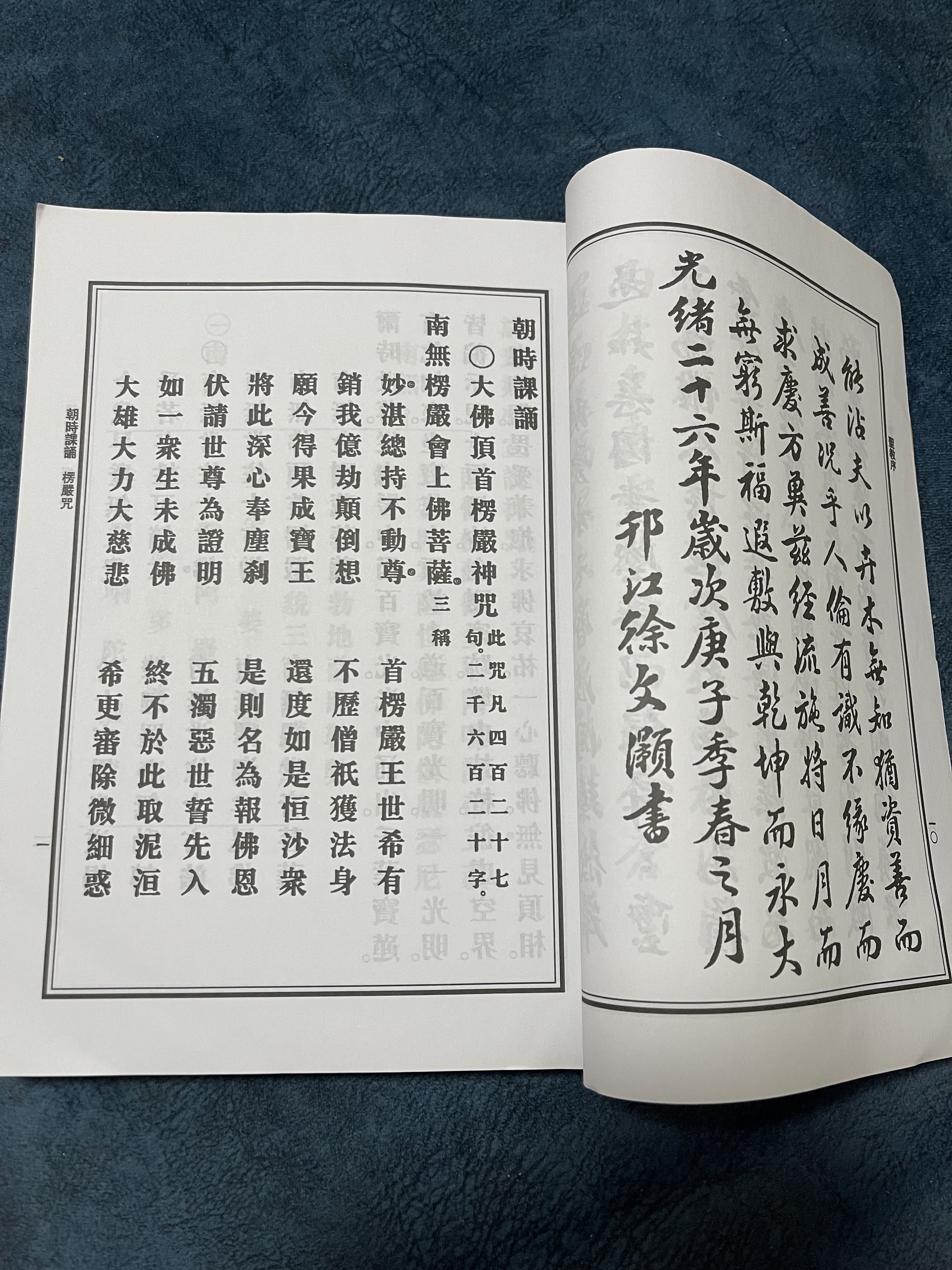
First page of a modern edition of the Chanmen Risong (禪門日誦, lit: "Daily Chants of the Chan Gate"), a compilation of liturgical texts for Chinese Buddhist liturgical services, showing the Śūraṅgama Mantra as the first mantra to be chanted during morning liturgical services.

During the Song (960–1279) and Yuan (1279–1368) dynasties, the mantra was used in a ritual called the Śūraṅgama assembly, which was held semi-annually during monastic retreats, beginning on the 10th day of the fourth month and ending on the 13th day of the seventh month according to the Chinese calendar. During these assemblies, a Śūraṅgama altar would be set up and participating monastics would gather and chant the mantra. The mantra was also codified into various monastic codes of conduct known as qinggui (清規, lit: "Pure rules"), many of which are traditionally held to derive from the Tang dynasty Chan monk Baizhang Huaihai (百丈懷海, 720–814). Some examples include the Conglin Jiaoding Qinggui Zongyao (叢林校定清規總要, lit: "General Essentials of the Revised Pure Rules of Monasteries", X63n1249) that was compiled in 1274 by the monk Jinhua Weimian (金華惟勉, ?-?) which lists nine ritual occasions where the mantra is to be chanted, the Huanzhu'an Qinggui (幻住庵清規, lit: "Pure Rules of the Cloister of Illusory Abode", X63n1248) that was compiled around 1317 by the Chan master Zhongfeng Mingben (中峰明本, 1263–1323) for his own private hermitage which lists up to twenty-five events during the ritual calendar where chanting the mantra is required, as well as the Chixiu Baizhang Qinggui (敕修百丈淸規, lit: "Revised Pure Rules of Baizhang", T48n2025) compiled between 1335 and 1343 by the Linji Chan monk Dongyang Dehui (東陽德輝, ?-?) that records ten events where the mantra is to be chanted. Biographies of notable monks also make mention of its usage by monastics. For instance, Juefan Huihong (覺範慧洪, 1071–1128), an eminent monastic belonging to the Huanglong branch of the Linji Chan tradition, mentions that the founder of the Huanglong line, Huanglong Huinan (黃龍慧南, 1002–1069), recited the Śūraṅgama Mantra to aid in or stimulate samādhi during meditation. Another example is the eminent Caodong Chan master Zhenxie Qingliao (真歇清了, 1088–1151), who used the mantra to keep monastics awake during meditation.

The mantra's usage continued to grow in the subsequent Ming dynasty (1368–1644) such that by the late-Ming period, it was codified as one of the mantras to be chanted during daily temple liturgical services in the Zhujing Risong Jiyao (諸經日誦集要, lit: "Compilation of Essentials for the Daily Chanting of Various Sūtras", J19nB044), an influential liturgical manual which was critically revised and edited by the eminent monk Yunqi Zhuhong (雲棲袾宏, 1535–1615), who was the Eighth Patriarch of the Chinese Pure Land tradition, and later reprinted by the eminent monk Ouyi Zhixu (蕅益智旭, 1599–1655), who was the Ninth Patriarch of the Chinese Pure Land tradition and Thirty-First Patriarch of the Tiantai tradition. The mantra's usage during daily liturgical services has continued to be preserved in the succeeding Qing dynasty (1644–1912) through to contemporary times as it has remained encoded in most popular liturgical manuals that has been published since. One example of such a manual is the Chanmen Risong (禪門日誦; lit: "Daily Chants of the Chan Gate"), a compilation whose earliest printed edition that is extant dates back to 1723 during the Qing dynasty and which was printed at Hoi Tong Monastery. Various subsequent editions with minor changes were published during the rest of the Qing dynasty period (1644–1912) through to the Republican era (1912–1949) by various temples. In the 21st century, one of the most popular editions has been the version that was originally published by Tianning Temple in Changzhou, which has seen modern reprints by retailers and publishers. Another example is the Fomen Bibei (佛門必備課誦本, lit: "Book of Essential Chants of the Buddhist Gate") which was first published during the Republican era and has also seen modern reprints. In most of these liturgical compilations, the mantra is usually listed as the first text chanted during morning liturgical services (known as the zaoke). According to an influential commentary on the daily liturgical service by the eminent Qing dynasty monk and National Preceptor Yulin Tongxiu (玉林通琇, 1614–1675), the purpose of the mantra during the service is to regulate the five desires (i.e. fame, lust, food, sleep and money) before they are able to arise so that the mind is able to quickly penetrate and directly reveal the true nature of the Tathāgatagarbha. In contemporary practice, the mantra has continued to remain as the first mantra to be recited during daily morning liturgical services (zaoke) in most Chinese Buddhist temples.

Various eminent monastics and masters have provided commentaries regarding the benefits and meaning of the Śūraṅgama Mantra, such as the eminent Qing dynasty (1644–1912) Huayan monk Baiting Xufa (柏亭續法, 1641–1728), who translated the mantra and provided a commentary regarding the significance of each of its sections as well as the deities summoned by it. His translation and commentary has remained influential in contemporary Chinese Buddhist practice. Another prominent example in modern times was the Chan Buddhist master Hsuan Hua, who heavily promoted and popularised the use of the mantra in North America and the Sinophone world as he valued it as fundamental to the existence of Buddhism.

== Teachings ==
The dhāraṇī is often seen as having magical apotropaic powers. It is associated with the deity Sitātapatrā, a protector against supernatural dangers and evil beings. According to a commentary by the Chan Buddhist monk Venerable Hsuan Hua, the continual existence and practice of the Śūraṅgama Mantra is essential to the existence of Buddhism itself; this teaching is based upon the Foshuo Famiejin Jing (佛說法滅盡經, lit: "The Buddha Speaks the Ultimate Extinction of the Dharma Sutra", T12n0396), another Mahāyāna sūtra where the Buddha expounds that both the Śūraṅgama Sūtra as well as Pratyutpanna Samādhi will be the first to disappear when the Dharma comes to an end in the world. Hsuan Hua also heavily recommends that practitioners who cultivate the mantra must maintain the purity of the Buddhist precepts, virtuous conduct as well as hold the right intentions. According to Hsuan Hua, the dhāraṇī contains five major divisions, which "control the vast demon armies of the five directions":

- In the East is the Vajra Division, hosted by Akṣobhya
- In the South, the Jewel-creating Division, hosted by Ratnasaṃbhava
- In the center, the Buddha Division, hosted by Śākyamuni
- In the West, the Lotus Division, hosted by Amitābha
- In the North, the Karma Division, hosted by Amoghasiddhi

== Text ==
=== Preamble ===
In most recitations during liturgical services in Chinese and Vietnamese Buddhist monasteries, the mantra itself is typically chanted after the recitation of a preamble which consists of the vows made by Ānanda in the Śūraṅgama Sūtra, the reaffirmation of refuge in Buddhist divinities and a description of the Buddha as he speaks the mantra from sūtra.

南無楞嚴會上佛菩薩 (三稱)

妙湛總持不動尊，首楞嚴王世希有

銷我億劫顛倒想，不歷僧祗獲法身

願今得果成寶王，還度如是恆沙眾

將此深心奉塵剎，是則名為報佛恩

伏請世尊為證明，五濁惡世誓先入

如一眾生未成佛，終不於此取泥洹

大雄大力大慈悲，希更審除微細惑

令我早登無上覺，於十方界坐道場

舜若多性可銷亡，爍迦羅心無動轉

南無常住十方佛，南無常住十方法

南無常住十方僧，南無釋迦牟尼佛

南無佛頂首楞嚴，南無觀世音菩薩

南無金剛藏菩薩

爾時世尊，從肉髻中涌百寶光，光中涌出千葉寶蓮，有化如來坐寶華中，頂放十道百寶光明。一一光明，皆徧示現十恆河沙，金剛密迹，擎山持杵，徧虛空界。大眾仰觀，畏愛兼抱，求佛哀祐，一心聽佛，無見頂相，放光如來宣說神咒。

Translation:

I take refuge in the Buddhas and Bodhisattvas of the Śūraṅgama assembly. (Repeat three times)

Oh, wondrous and profound Dharani Immovable Honoured One, Śūraṅgama King who is rare in the world!

Extinguish the trillions of kalpas of inverted thoughts (delusions) I hold, and let me not endure asaṃkhyeya kalpas before attaining the Dharma body.

I vow to attain the fruit (of enlightenment) and become a Jewelled King (epithet for the Buddha), and return to deliver the multitudes of sentient beings who number as much as the sands of the Ganges river.

I offer this profound mind to the myriad worlds numbering as many as dust motes, for this is known as repaying the Buddha's compassion.

I reverently invite the World Honoured One to be my witness, and vow to first enter the evil world of the Five Turbidities.

If even a single sentient being has not attained Buddhahood, I shall hereof not attain Nirvana.

Oh, Greatly Heroic, Greatly Powerful and Greatly Compassionate One, I further wish to examine and eliminate all my subtle delusions.

Let me soon attain Anuttarasamyaksaṃbodhi, and sit in the bodhimaṇḍas of all worlds in all ten directions.

Śūnyatā itself may come to an end, but my Cakra mind shall remain immovable.

I take refuge in the ever-abiding Buddhas of all ten directions. I take refuge in the ever-abiding Dharmas of all ten directions.

I take refuge in the ever-abiding Sanghas of all ten directions. I take refuge in Śākyamuni Buddha.

I take refuge in the Śūraṅgama of the Buddha's uṣṇīṣa. I take refuge in Guanshiyin Bodhisattva.

I take refuge in Vajragarbha Bodhisattva.

At that time, the World Honoured One, from his uṣṇīṣa, emitted forth a hundred jewelled lights. From the lights arose a jewelled lotus with a thousand petals. Within the jewelled flower sat a Tathāgata, emitting a hundred jewelled lights in all ten directions from his uṣṇīṣa. In each light manifested Guhyapādas (Vajra Secret Traces) numbering as many as the number of sand in ten Ganges Rivers, wielding mountains and vajras, appearing throughout space. The congregation looked up with a mixture of fear and love. Imploring the Buddha's compassionate protection, they listened to the Buddha's invisible uṣṇīṣa with one mind, and the Tathāgata who released the lights proclaimed the divine mantra.

=== The mantra ===
==== First assembly ====
| Language and Romanization | Transcriptions |
|---|---|
| Sanskrit | Namaḥ sarva buddha bodhi-satve-bhyaḥ. Namaḥ saptānāṃ samyak-saṃbuddha koṭīnāṃ sa-śrāvaka saṃghānāṃ. Namo loke arhattāṃ. Namaḥ srotāpannānāṃ. Namaḥ sakṛdāgāmināṃ. Namaḥ anāgāmināṃ. Namo loke samyag-gatānāṃ samyak-prati-pannānāṃ. Namo devarṣiṇāṃ. Namaḥ siddha-vidyā-dhāra-rṣiṇāṃ, śāpānugraha-samarthānāṃ. Namo brahmaṇe. Nama indrāya. Namo bhagavate rudrāya umāpati-sahīyāya. Namo bhagavate nārāyaṇāya, lakṣmi paṃca-mahā-mudrā namas-kṛtāya. Namo bhagavate mahā-kālāya, tripura-nagara-vidrāpaṇa-karāya, adhi-muktaka śmaśāna-vāsine, mātṛ-gaṇa namas-kṛtāya. Namo bhagavate tathāgata kulāya. Namo bhagavate padma kulāya. Namo bhagavate vajra kulāya. Namo bhagavate maṇi kulāya. Namo bhagavate gaja-kulāya. Namo bhagavate dṛḍha-śūra-sena-pra-haraṇa-rājāya, tathāgatāya arhate samyak-saṃbuddhāya. Namo bhagavate Amitābhāya, tathāgatāya arhate samyak-saṃbuddhāya. Namo bhagavate akṣobhyāya, tathāgatāya arhate samyak-saṃbuddhāya. Namo bhagavate bhaiṣajya-guru-vaiḍūrya-prabha-rājāya, tathāgatāya arhate samyak-saṃbuddhāya. Namo bhagavate saṃpuṣpita-sālendra-rājāya, tathāgatāya arhate samyak-saṃbuddhāya. Namo bhagavate Śākyamunaye, tathāgatāya arhate samyak-saṃbuddhāya. Namo bhagavate ratna-kusuma-ketu-rājāya, tathāgatāya arhate samyak-saṃbuddhāya. Teṣāṃ namas-kṛtva imāṃ bhagavata stathāgatoṣṇīṣaṃ, sitātapatraṃ namāparājitaṃ pratyaṅgirāṃ. Sarva bhūta-graha nigraha-karaṇīṃ. Para vidyā cchedanīṃ. Akālaṃ-mṛtyu pari-trāṇa-karīṃ. Sarva bandhana mokṣaṇīṃ. Sarva duṣṭa duḥ-svapna nivāraṇīṃ. Caturaśītīnāṃ graha sahasrāṇāṃ vi-dhvaṃsana-karīṃ. Aṣṭā-viṃśatināṃ nakṣatrāṇāṃ pra-sādana-karīṃ. Aṣṭānāṃ mahā-grahāṇāṃ vi-dhvaṃsana-karīṃ. Sarva śatrū nivāraṇīṃ. Ghoraṃ duḥ-svapnānāṃ ca nāśanīṃ. Viṣa śastra agni uttaraṇīṃ. Aparājitaṃ mahā-ghorāṃ, mahā-balāṃ mahā-caṇḍāṃ mahā-dīptaṃ mahā-tejaṃ, mahā-śvetāṃ mahā-jvalaṃ mahā-balā pāṇḍara-vāsinī, ārya-tārā bhṛkuṭīṃ ceva vijaya vajra-maleti vi-śrutāṃ, padmaṃkaṃ vajra-jihva ca mālā-cevāparājita, vajrā daṇḍīṃ viśālā ca śanta vaideva-pūjitāṃ, saumya-rūpaṃ mahā-śvetā, ārya-tārā mahā-bala aparā vajra śaṅkalā ceva, vajra kaumāri kulan-dharī, vajra hastā ca mahā-vidyā kāṃcana mālikā, kusuṃbhā ratna ceva vairocanā kulāthadāṃ uṣṇīṣa, vi-jṛmbha-māṇā ca savajra kanaka prabha locana, vajrā tuṇḍī ca śvetā ca kamalākṣī śaśī-prabha, ityete mudrā gaṇā, sarve rakṣaṃ kurvantu mama sarva satvānāṃ ca. |
| Traditional Chinese | 南無薩怛他。蘇伽多耶。阿囉訶帝。三藐三菩陀寫。南無薩怛他。佛陀俱知。瑟尼釤。南無薩婆勃陀勃地。薩跢鞞弊。南無薩多南。三藐三菩陀。俱知南。娑舍囉婆迦。僧伽喃。南無盧雞阿羅漢跢喃。南無蘇盧多波那喃。南無娑羯唎陀伽彌喃。南無盧雞三藐伽跢喃。三藐伽波囉。底波多那喃。南無提婆離瑟赧。南無悉陀耶。毗地耶。陀囉離瑟赧。舍波奴揭囉訶。 娑訶娑囉摩他喃。南無跋囉訶摩泥。南無因陀囉耶。南無婆伽婆帝。嚧陀囉耶。烏摩般帝。娑醯夜耶。南無婆伽婆帝。那囉野拏耶。槃遮摩訶三慕陀囉。南無悉羯唎多耶。南無婆伽婆帝。摩訶迦囉耶。地唎般剌那伽囉。毗陀囉波拏迦囉耶。阿地目帝。屍摩舍那泥婆悉泥。摩怛唎伽拏。南無悉羯唎多耶。南無婆伽婆帝。多他伽跢俱囉耶。南無般頭摩俱囉耶。南無跋闍囉俱囉耶。南無摩尼俱囉耶。南無伽闍俱囉耶。南無婆伽婆帝。帝唎茶。輸囉西那。波囉訶囉拏囉闍耶。跢他伽多耶。南無婆伽婆帝。南無阿彌多婆耶。跢他伽多耶。阿囉訶帝。三藐三菩陀耶。南無婆伽婆帝。阿芻毗耶。跢他伽多耶。阿囉訶帝。三藐三菩陀耶。南無婆伽婆帝。鞞沙闍耶。俱嚧吠柱唎耶。般囉婆囉闍耶。跢他伽多耶。南無婆伽婆帝。三補師毖多。薩憐捺囉剌闍耶。跢他伽多耶。阿囉訶帝。三藐三菩陀耶。南無婆伽婆帝。舍雞野母那曳。跢他伽多耶。阿囉訶帝。三藐三菩陀耶。南無婆伽婆帝。剌怛那雞都囉闍耶。跢他伽多耶。阿囉訶帝。三藐三菩陀耶。帝瓢。南無薩羯唎多。翳曇婆伽婆多。薩怛他伽都瑟尼釤。薩怛多般怛㘕。南無阿婆囉視耽。般囉帝。揚岐囉。薩囉婆。部多揭囉訶。尼羯囉訶。揭迦囉訶尼。跋囉毖地耶。叱陀你。阿迦囉。蜜唎柱。般唎怛囉耶。寧羯唎。薩囉婆。槃陀那。目叉尼。薩囉婆。突瑟吒。突悉乏。般那你。伐囉尼。赭都囉。失帝南。羯囉訶。娑訶薩囉若闍。毗多崩娑那羯唎。阿瑟吒冰舍帝南。那叉剎怛囉若闍。波囉薩陀那羯唎。阿瑟吒南。摩訶揭囉訶若闍。毗多崩薩那羯唎。薩婆舍都嚧。你婆囉若闍。呼藍突悉乏。難遮那舍尼。毖沙舍。悉怛囉。阿吉尼。烏陀迦囉若闍。阿般囉視多具囉。摩訶般囉戰持。摩訶疊多。摩訶帝闍。摩訶稅多闍婆羅。摩訶跋羅槃陀囉。婆悉你。阿唎耶多囉。毗唎俱知。誓婆毗闍耶。跋闍囉摩禮底。毗舍嚧多。勃騰罔迦。跋闍囉制喝那阿遮。摩囉制婆。般囉質多。跋闍囉擅持。毗舍囉遮。扇多舍。鞞提婆。補視多。蘇摩嚧波。摩訶稅多。阿唎耶多囉。摩訶婆囉阿般囉。跋闍囉商羯囉制婆。跋闍囉俱摩唎。俱藍陀唎。跋闍囉喝薩多遮。毗地耶。乾遮那。摩唎迦。啒蘇母。婆羯囉跢那。鞞嚧遮那俱唎耶。夜囉菟。瑟尼釤。毗折藍婆摩尼遮。跋闍囉迦那迦波囉婆。嚧闍那。跋闍囉頓稚遮。稅多遮。迦摩囉。剎奢屍。波囉婆。翳帝夷帝。母陀囉羯拏。娑鞞囉懺。掘梵都。印菟那麼麼寫。 |

==== Second assembly ====
| Language and Romanization | Transcriptions |
|---|---|
| Sanskrit | Oṃ ṛṣi-gaṇa praśastāya sarva tathāgatoṣṇīṣāya hūṃ trūṃ. Jambhana-kara hūṃ trūṃ. Stambhana-kara hūṃ trūṃ. Mohana-kara hūṃ trūṃ. Mathana-kara hūṃ trūṃ. Para-vidyā saṃ-bhakṣaṇa-kara hūṃ trūṃ. Sarva duṣṭānāṃ stambhana-kara hūṃ trūṃ. Sarva yakṣa rākṣasa grahāṇāṃ, vi-dhvaṃ sana-kara hūṃ trūṃ. Caturaśītīnāṃ graha sahasrāṇāṃ, vi-dhvaṃsana-kara hūṃ trūṃ. Aṣṭā-viṃśatīnāṃ nakṣatrānāṃ pra-sādana-kara hūṃ trūṃ. Aṣṭānāṃ mahā-grahāṇāṃ utsādana-kara hūṃ trūṃ. Rakṣa rakṣa māṃ. Bhagavan stathāgatoṣṇīṣa sitātapatra mahā vajroṣṇīṣa, mahā pratyaṅgire mahā sahasra-bhuje sahasra-śīrṣe, koṭī-śata sahasra-netre, abhedya jvalitā-taṭaka, mahā-vajrodāra tri-bhuvana maṇḍala. Oṃ svastir bhavatu māṃ mama. |
| Traditional Chinese | 烏𤙖。唎瑟揭拏。般剌舍悉多。薩怛他。伽都瑟尼釤。虎𤙖。都嚧雍。瞻婆那。虎𤙖。都嚧雍。悉耽婆那。虎𤙖。都嚧雍。波囉瑟地耶。三般叉拏羯囉。虎𤙖。都嚧雍。薩婆藥叉。喝囉剎婆。揭囉訶若闍。毗騰崩薩。那羯囉。虎𤙖。都嚧雍。者都囉。屍底南。揭囉訶。娑訶薩囉南。毗騰崩薩那囉。虎𤙖。都嚧雍。囉叉。婆伽梵。薩怛他。伽都瑟尼釤。波囉點闍吉唎。摩訶娑訶薩囉。勃樹娑訶薩囉。室唎沙。俱知娑訶薩泥。帝㘑。阿弊提視婆唎多。吒吒甖迦。摩訶跋闍嚧陀囉。帝唎菩婆那。曼茶囉。烏𤙖。莎悉帝。薄婆都。麼麼。印菟那麼麼寫。 |

==== Third assembly ====
| Language and Romanization | Transcriptions |
|---|---|
| Sanskrit | Rāja-bhayā cora-bhayā udaka-bhayā agni-bhayā, viṣa-bhayā śastra-bhayā para-cakra-bhayā dur-bhikṣa-bhayā, aśani-bhayā akāla-mṛtyu-bhayā dharaṇī-bhūmi-kampā-bhayā ulkā-pāta-bhayā, rāja-daṇḍa-bhayā suparṇi-bhayā nāga-bhayā vidyu-bhayā. Deva-grahā nāga-grahā yakṣa-grahā rākṣasa-grahā preta-grahā, piśāca-grahā bhūta-grahā kumbhaṇḍa-grahā pūtana-grahā, kaṭa-pūtana-grahā skanda-grahā apasmāra-grahā utmāda-grahā, cchāya-grahā revati-grahā jamika-grahā kaṇṭha-kamini-grahā. Ojāhāriṇyā garbhāhāriṇyā jātāhāriṇyā jīvitāhāriṇyā, rudhirāhāriṇyā vasāhāriṇyā māṃsāhāriṇyā medāhāriṇyā, majjāhāriṇyā vāntāhāriṇyā aśucyāhāriṇyā ciccāhāriṇyā, teṣāṃ sarveṣāṃ. Sarva grahāṇāṃ vidyāṃ cchinda-yāmi kīla-yāmi. Pari-brajāka kṛtāṃ vidyāṃ cchinda-yāmi kīla-yāmi. Ḍāka-ḍākinī kṛtāṃ vidyāṃ cchinda-yāmi kīla-yāmi. Mahā-paśupati rudra kṛtāṃ vidyāṃ cchinda-yāmi kīla-yāmi. Nārāyaṇā paṃca mahā mudrā kṛtāṃ vidyāṃ cchinda-yāmi kīla-yāmi. Tatva garuḍa sahīyāya kṛtāṃ vidyāṃ cchinda-yāmi kīla-yāmi. Mahā-kāla mātṛgaṇa sahīyāya kṛtāṃ vidyāṃ cchinda-yāmi kīla-yāmi. Kāpālika kṛtāṃ vidyāṃ cchinda-yāmi kīla-yāmi. Jayakarā madhukara sarvārtha-sādhaka kṛtāṃ, vidyāṃ cchinda-yāmi kīla-yāmi. Catur-bhaginī bhratṛ-paṃcama sahīyāya kṛtāṃ, vidyāṃ cchinda-yāmi kīla-yāmi. Bhṛṅgi-riṭika nandi-keśvara gaṇapati sahīya kṛtāṃ, vidyāṃ cchinda-yāmi kīla-yāmi. Nagna-śramaṇa kṛtāṃ vidyāṃ cchinda-yāmi kīla-yāmi. Arhanta kṛtāṃ vidyāṃ cchinda-yāmi kīla-yāmi. Vīta-rāga kṛtāṃ vidyāṃ cchinda-yāmi kīla-yāmi. Vajra-pāṇi guhyakādhipati kṛtāṃ vidyāṃ cchinda-yāmi kīla-yāmi. Rakṣa rakṣa māṃ. |
| Traditional Chinese | 囉闍婆夜。主囉婆夜。阿祗尼婆夜。烏陀迦婆夜。毗沙婆夜。舍薩多囉婆夜。婆囉斫羯囉婆夜。突瑟叉婆夜。阿舍你婆夜。阿迦囉蜜唎柱婆夜。陀囉尼部彌劍。波伽波陀婆夜。烏囉迦婆多婆夜。剌闍壇茶婆夜。那伽婆夜。毗條怛婆夜。蘇波囉拏婆夜。藥叉揭囉訶。囉叉私揭囉訶。畢唎多揭囉訶。毗舍遮揭囉訶。部多揭囉訶。鳩槃茶揭囉訶。補丹那揭囉訶。迦吒補丹那揭囉訶。悉乾度揭囉訶。阿播悉摩囉揭囉訶。烏檀摩陀揭囉訶。車夜揭囉訶。醯唎婆帝揭囉訶。社多訶唎喃。揭婆訶唎喃。嚧地囉訶唎喃。忙娑訶唎喃。謎陀訶唎喃。摩闍訶唎喃。闍多訶唎女。視比多訶唎喃。毗多訶唎喃。婆多訶唎喃。阿輸遮訶唎女。質多訶唎女。帝釤薩鞞釤。薩婆揭囉訶南。毗陀耶闍。嗔陀夜彌。雞囉夜彌。波唎跋囉者迦。訖唎擔。毗陀夜闍。嗔陀夜彌。雞囉夜彌。茶演尼。訖唎擔。毗陀夜闍。瞋陀夜彌。雞囉夜彌。摩訶般輸。般怛夜。嚧陀囉。訖唎擔。毗陀夜闍。瞋陀夜彌。雞囉夜彌。那囉夜拏。訖唎擔。毗陀夜闍。瞋陀夜彌。雞囉夜彌。怛埵伽嚧茶西。訖唎擔。毗陀耶闍。瞋陀夜彌。雞囉夜彌。摩訶迦囉。摩怛唎伽拏。訖唎擔。毗陀夜闍。嗔陀夜彌。雞囉夜彌。迦婆唎迦。訖唎擔。毗陀夜闍。瞋陀夜彌。雞囉夜彌。闍耶羯囉。摩度羯囉。薩婆囉他。娑達那。訖唎擔。毗陀夜闍。瞋陀夜彌。雞囉夜彌。赭咄囉婆耆你。訖唎擔。毗陀夜闍。瞋陀夜彌。雞囉夜彌。毗唎羊訖唎知。難陀雞沙囉。伽拏般帝。索醯夜。訖唎擔。毗陀夜闍。瞋陀夜彌。雞囉夜彌。那揭那舍囉婆拏。訖唎擔。毗陀夜闍。嗔陀夜彌。雞囉夜彌。阿羅漢。訖唎擔。毗陀夜闍。瞋陀夜彌。雞囉夜彌。毗多囉伽。訖唎擔。毗陀夜闍。瞋陀夜彌。雞囉夜彌。跋闍囉波你。具醯夜具醯夜。迦地般帝。訖唎擔。毗陀夜闍。瞋陀夜彌。雞囉夜彌。囉叉罔。婆伽梵。印兔那麼麼寫。 |

==== Fourth assembly ====
| Language and Romanization | Transcriptions |
|---|---|
| Sanskrit | Bhagavata stathāgatoṣṇīṣaṃ sitātapatraṃ namo-stute. Asitānalārka prabha-sphuṭa vikasitātapatre. Jvala jvala dhaka-dhaka vidhaka-vidhaka dara dara vidara vidara, cchinda cchinda bhinda bhinda, hūṃ hūṃ phaṭ! phaṭ! svāhā. Hehe phaṭ. Amogha phaṭ. Apratihata phaṭ. Vara-prada phaṭ. Asura vidrāpaka phaṭ. Sarva deve-bhyaḥ phaṭ. Sarva nāge-bhyaḥ phaṭ. Sarva yakṣe-bhyaḥ phaṭ. Sarva rākṣase-bhyaḥ phaṭ. Sarva garuḍe-bhyaḥ phaṭ. Sarva gāndharve-bhyaḥ phaṭ. Sarva asure-bhyaḥ phaṭ. Sarva kindare-bhyaḥ phaṭ. Sarva mahorage-bhyaḥ phaṭ. Sarva manuṣe-bhyaḥ phaṭ. Sarva amanuṣe-bhyaḥ phaṭ. Sarva bhūte-bhyaḥ phaṭ. Sarva piśāce-bhyaḥ phaṭ. Sarva kumbhaṇḍe-bhyaḥ phaṭ. Sarva pūtane-bhyaḥ phaṭ. Sarva kaṭa-pūtane-bhyaḥ phaṭ. Sarva dur-laṅghite-bhyaḥ phaṭ. Sarva duṣ-prekṣite-bhyaḥ phaṭ. Sarva jvare-bhyaḥ phaṭ. Sarva apasmāre-bhyaḥ phaṭ. Sarva śramaṇe-bhyaḥ phaṭ. Sarva tirthike-bhyaḥ phaṭ. Sarva utmāde-bhyaḥ phaṭ. Sarva vidyā-rājācārye-bhyaḥ phaṭ. Jayakarā madhukara sarvārtha-sādhake-bhyaḥ phaṭ. Sarva vidyācārye-bhyaḥ phaṭ. Catur bhaginī-bhyaḥ phaṭ. Vajra kaumāri kulan-dharī mahā-vidyā-rājebhyaḥ phaṭ. Mahā-pratyaṅgire-bhyaḥ phaṭ. Vajra śaṅkalāya phaṭ. Mahā-pratyaṅgira-rājāya phaṭ. Mahā-kālāya mahā-mātṛ-gaṇa namas-kṛtāya phaṭ. Vaiṣṇuvīye phaṭ. Brahmaṇīye phaṭ. Agnīye phaṭ. Mahā-kālīye phaṭ. Kāla-daṇḍīye phaṭ. Indrīye phaṭ. Raudrīye phaṭ. Cāmuṇḍīye phaṭ. Kāla-rātrīye phaṭ. Kāpālīye phaṭ. Adhi-muktaka śmaśāna vāsinīye phaṭ. Yeke-citta satva mama. |
| Traditional Chinese | 婆伽梵。薩怛多般怛囉。南無粹都帝。阿悉多那囉剌迦。波囉婆悉普吒。毗迦薩怛多鉢帝唎。什佛囉什佛囉。陀囉陀囉。頻陀囉頻陀羅。瞋陀瞋陀。虎𤙖。虎𤙖。泮吒。泮吒泮吒泮吒泮吒。娑訶。醯醯泮。阿牟迦耶泮。阿波囉提訶多泮。婆囉波囉陀泮。阿素囉毗陀囉波迦泮。薩婆提鞞弊泮。薩婆那伽弊泮。薩婆藥叉弊泮。薩婆乾闥婆弊泮。薩婆補丹那弊泮。迦吒補丹那弊泮。薩婆突狼枳帝弊泮。薩婆突澀比𠼐。訖瑟帝弊泮。薩婆什婆𠼐弊泮。薩婆阿播悉摩𠼐弊泮。薩婆舍囉婆拏弊泮。薩婆地帝雞弊泮。薩婆怛摩陀繼弊泮。薩婆毗陀耶。囉誓遮𠼐弊泮。闍夜羯囉。摩度羯囉。薩婆囉他娑陀雞弊泮。毗地夜。遮𠼐弊泮。者都囉。縛耆你弊泮。跋闍囉。俱摩唎。毗陀夜。囉誓弊泮。摩訶波囉丁羊。義耆唎弊泮。跋闍囉。商羯囉夜。波囉丈耆囉闍耶泮。摩訶迦囉夜。摩訶末怛唎迦拏。南無娑羯唎多夜泮。毖瑟拏婢曳泮。勃囉訶牟尼曳泮。阿耆尼曳泮。摩訶羯唎曳泮。羯囉檀遲曳泮。蔑怛唎曳泮。嘮怛唎曳泮。遮文茶曳泮。羯邏囉怛唎曳泮。迦般唎曳泮。阿地目質多。迦屍摩舍那。婆私你曳泮。演吉質。薩埵婆寫。麼麼印兔那麼麼寫。 |

==== Fifth assembly ====
| Language and Romanization | Transcriptions |
|---|---|
| Sanskrit | Duṣṭa-cittā pāpa-cittā raudra-cittā vi-dveṣa amaitra-cittā. Utpāda-yanti kīla-yanti mantra-yanti japanti juhvanti. Ojāhārā garbhāhārā rudhirāhārā vasāhārā, majjāhārā jātāhārā jīvitāhārā malyāhārā, gandhāhārā puṣpāhārā phalāhārā sasyāhārā. Pāpa-cittā duṣṭa-cittā raudra-cittā. Yakṣa-graha rākṣasa-graha preta-graha piśāca-graha, bhūta-graha kumbhaṇḍa-graha skanda-graha utmāda-graha, cchāya-graha apasmāra-graha ḍāka-ḍākinī-graha, revati-graha jamika-graha śakuni-graha mantra-nandika-graha, lamvika-graha hanu kaṇṭha-pāṇi-graha. Jvara ekāhikā dvaitīyakā straitīyakā catur-thakā. Nitya-jvarā viṣama-jvarā vātikā paittikā, śleṣmikā san-nipatikā sarva-jvarā. Śirortti ardhavabhedaka arocaka, akṣi-rogaṃ nasa-rogaṃ mukha-rogaṃ hṛd-rogaṃ gala-grahaṃ, karṇa-śūlaṃ danta-śūlaṃ hṛdaya-śūlaṃ marma-śūlaṃ, pārśva-śūlaṃ pṛṣṭha-śūlaṃ udara-śūlaṃ kaṇṭī-śūlaṃ, vasti-śūlaṃ ūru-śūlaṃ jāṅgha-śūlaṃ hasta-śūlaṃ, pāda-śūlaṃ sarvāṅga-pratyaṅga-śūlaṃ. Bhūta vetāḍa ḍāka-ḍākinī jvara. Dadru kāṇḍu kiṭibhalota vaisarpa-lohāliṅga, śūṣa trasa gara viṣa-yoga, agni udaka mara vaira kāntāra akālaṃ-mṛtyu. Traibuka trai-laṭaka vṛścika sarpa nakula, siṃgha vyāghra ṛkṣa tarakṣa mṛga, sva-para jīva teṣāṃ sarveṣāṃ. Sitātapatraṃ mahā-vajroṣṇīṣaṃ mahā-pratyaṅgiraṃ. Yāvadvā-daśa yojanābhyantareṇa, sīmā-bandhaṃ karomi, diśā-bandhaṃ karomi, pāra-vidyā-bandhaṃ karomi, tejo-bandhaṃ karomi, hasta-bandhaṃ karomi, pāda-bandhaṃ karomi, sarvāṅga-pratyaṅga-bandhaṃ karomi. Tadyathā: Oṃ anale anale viśade viśade vīra vajra-dhare, bandha bandhani, vajra-pāṇi phaṭ! hūṃ trūṃ phaṭ! svāhā. Namaḥ stathāgatāya sugatāya arhate samyak-saṃ buddhāya, siddhyantu mantra-pada svāhā. |
| Traditional Chinese | 突瑟吒質多。阿末怛唎質多。烏闍訶囉。伽婆訶囉。嚧地囉訶囉。婆娑訶囉。摩闍訶囉。闍多訶囉。視毖多訶囉。跋略夜訶囉。乾陀訶囉。布史波訶囉。頗囉訶囉。婆寫訶囉。般波質多。突瑟吒質多。嘮陀囉質多。藥叉揭囉訶。囉剎娑揭囉訶。閉㘑多揭囉訶。閉舍遮揭囉訶。部多揭囉訶。鳩槃茶揭囉訶。悉乾陀揭囉訶。烏怛陀摩揭囉訶。車夜揭囉訶。阿播薩摩囉揭囉訶。宅祛革茶耆尼揭囉訶。唎佛帝揭囉訶。闍彌迦揭囉訶。舍俱尼揭囉訶。姥陀囉難地迦揭囉訶。阿藍婆揭囉訶。乾度波尼揭囉訶。什伐囉。堙迦醯迦。墜帝藥迦。怛隸帝藥迦。者突託迦。昵提什伐囉。毖釤摩什伐囉。薄底迦。鼻底迦。室隸瑟蜜迦。娑你般帝迦。薩婆什伐囉。室嚧吉帝。末陀鞞達嚧制劍。阿綺嚧鉗。目佉嚧鉗。羯唎突嚧鉗。揭囉訶揭藍羯拏輸藍。憚多輸藍。迄唎夜輸藍。末麼輸藍。跋唎室婆輸藍。毖栗瑟吒輸藍。烏陀囉輸藍。羯知輸藍。跋悉帝輸藍。鄔嚧輸藍。常迦輸藍。喝悉多輸藍。跋陀輸藍。娑房盎伽般囉丈伽輸藍。部多毖跢茶。茶耆尼。什婆囉。陀突嚧迦。建咄嚧吉知。婆路多毗。薩般嚧訶凌伽。輸沙怛囉。娑那羯囉。毗沙喻迦。阿耆尼。烏陀迦。末囉鞞囉建跢囉。阿迦囉。蜜唎咄。怛歛部迦。地栗剌吒。毖唎瑟質迦。薩婆那俱囉。肆引伽弊。揭囉唎藥叉。怛囉芻。末囉視。吠帝釤。娑鞞釤。悉怛多鉢怛囉。摩訶跋闍嚧。瑟尼釤。摩訶般賴丈耆藍。夜波突陀舍喻闍那。辮怛隸拏。毗陀耶。槃曇迦嚧彌。帝殊。槃曇迦嚧彌。般囉毗陀。槃曇迦嚧彌。哆姪他。唵。阿那隸。毗舍提。鞞囉。跋闍囉。陀唎。槃陀。槃陀你。跋闍囉。謗尼泮。虎𤙖。都嚧甕泮。娑婆訶。 |

== See also ==
- Śūraṅgama Sūtra
- Nīlakaṇṭha Dhāraṇī
- Guhyasamāja Tantra
- Uṣṇīṣa Vijaya Dhāraṇī Sūtra
- Oṃ maṇi padme hūm̐
- Ten Small Mantras
