= Sitatapatra =

Protector against supernatural danger in Buddhism

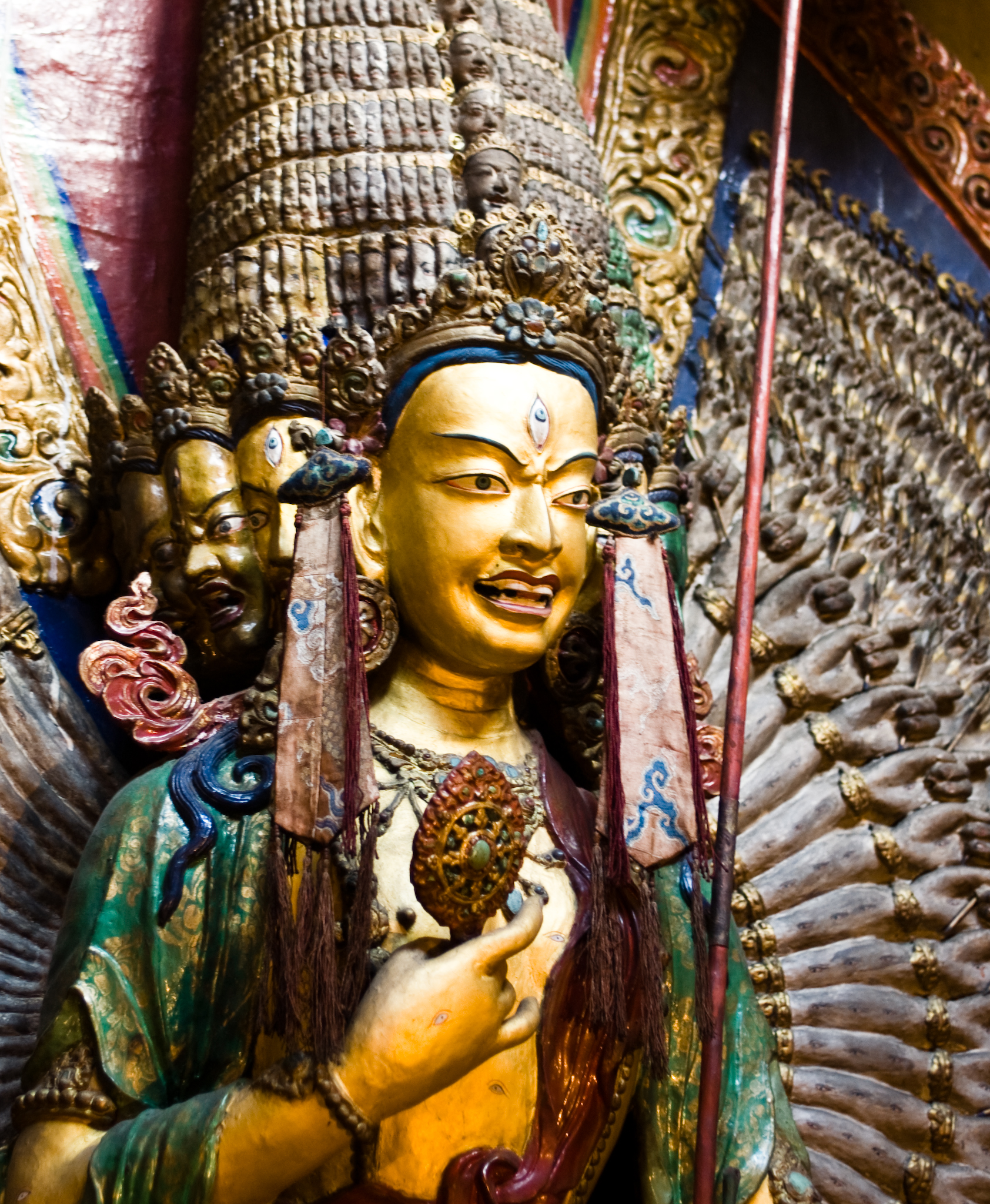
- Statue of 1000 arm Sitātapatrā in Leh, Ladakh, India

Chinese name
- Chinese: 白傘蓋佛頂
Transcriptions
Standard Mandarin
- Hanyu Pinyin: Bái Sǎngài Fódǐng
- Wade–Giles: Pai^{2} San^{3}-kai^{4} Fo^{2}-ting^{3}

Tibetan name
- Tibetan: གདུགས་དཀར་མོ།
Transcriptions
- Wylie: gdugs dkar mo

Korean name
- Hangul: 시타타파트라
Transcriptions
- Revised Romanization: sitatapateura

Mongolian name
- Mongolian Cyrillic: Цагаан шүхэрт Tsagaan shühert

Japanese name
- Kanji: 白傘蓋仏頂
- Kana: びゃくさんがいぶっちょう シタータパトラー
Transcriptions
- Romanization: Byaku Sangai Butchō; Shitātapatorā

Filipino name
- Tagalog: Sitatapatla

Tamil name
- Tamil: சீதாதபத்திரை

Sanskrit name
- Sanskrit: सितातपत्रा (Sitātapatrā)

Pali name
- Pali: Sitātapattā

Sitātapatrā (Sanskrit: "White Parasol") is a bodhisattva and protector against supernatural danger in Buddhism. She is venerated in both the Mahayana and Vajrayana traditions. She is also known as Usnisasitatapatra or Uṣṇīṣa Sitātapatrā. It is believed that Sitātapatrā is a powerful independent deity emanated by Gautama Buddha from his Uṣṇīṣa. Whoever practices her mantra will be reborn in Amitābha's pure land of Sukhāvatī as well as gaining protection against supernatural danger and witchcraft.

== Name ==
Her name is composed of sita ("white") and ātapatrā ("parasol" or "umbrella").

== Forms ==
There are several different forms of Sitatapatra including: with one face and two arms; with three faces and six arms; with three faces and eight arms; with three faces and ten arms; with five faces and ten arms; and, with 1000 faces, 1000 arms and 1000 legs.

== Mantras ==
ཧཱུཾ་མ་མ་ཧཱུཾ་ནི་སྭཱཧཱ། Hum ma ma hum ni svaha

The Śūraṅgama Mantra of the Śūraṅgama Sūtra is the most commonly practiced mantra invoking her. According to Thubten Zopa Rinpoche, the "Great White Umbrella" is a sādhanā for healing illness, dispelling interferences and spirit possession, quelling disasters, and bringing auspiciousness. To do practice in full requires a kriyātantra abhiṣeka of Sitātapatrā for the Vajrayana practitioners. The dhāraṇī "ārya-tathāgatoṣṇīṣa-sitātapatrāparājita-mahāpratyaṅgirāparama-siddhā-nāma-dhāraṇī" (English: "The Noble Dhāraṇī of Sitātapatrā Born from the Tathāgata’s Uṣṇīṣa, Great Dispeller of Invincible Might and Supreme Accomplishment") is a common action tantra practice of Sitātapatrā.

== Symbolism ==
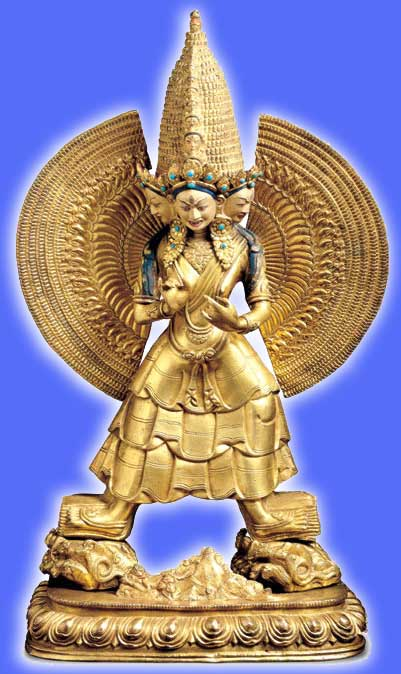
Sitatapatra

Sitātapatrā is one of the most complex Vajrayana goddesses. According to Miranda Shaw in the Buddhist Goddesses of India, Sitātapatrā emerged from Buddha's uṣṇīṣa when he was in the Trāyastriṃśa heaven. The Buddha announced her role to "cut asunder completely all malignant demons, to cut asunder all the spells of others...to turn aside all enemies and dangers and hatred." Sitātapatrā's benign and beautiful form belies her ferocity as she is a "fierce, terrifying goddess, garlanded by flames, a pulverizer of enemies and demons."

In the Mahayana Sitatapatra Sutra, she is called Aparājita "Undefeatable, Unconquerable" and is also identified as a form of goddess Tārā.

In other sutras, she is regarded as a female counterpart to Avalokiteśvara, the bodhisattva of compassion. Like him, Sitātapatrā manifests in many elaborate forms: having a thousand faces, arms and legs, or simply as a feminine deity of great beauty. Known foremost for her "white parasol" she is most frequently attributed with the "golden wheel". The auspiciousness of the turning of the dharma wheel is symbolic of Buddhism, both in its teachings and realizations.

Chinese and Vietnamese Buddhist often recite her a Sino rendering of her Sanskrit title (Maha, meaning "great") Sitātapatrā (Ma Ha Tất Đát Đa Bát Đát Ra 摩訶悉怛多缽怛囉) as a protection mantra, often alongside a starting Om and then svaha but sometimes just the name by itself.

== See also ==
- List of bodhisattvas
