= Tongwadian (Dali) =

Buddhist temple in Yunnan, China

- 铜瓦殿
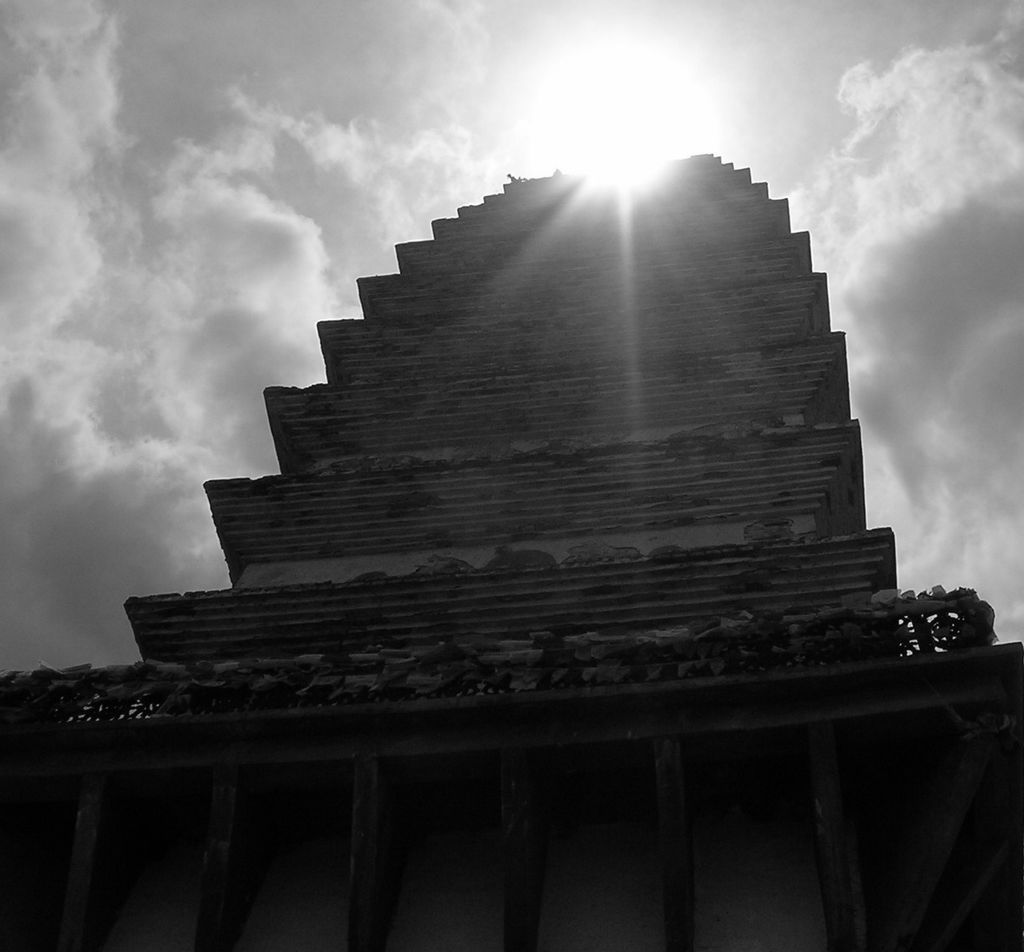
- Surangama Pagoda in Jinding Temple.

- Location within Yunnan

Religion
- Affiliation: Buddhism
- Sect: Chan Buddhism
- Leadership: Shi Weisheng (释惟圣)

Location
- Location: Mount Jizu, Dali, Yunnan
- Country: China
- Interactive map of Tongwadian
- Coordinates: 25°58′28″N 100°22′06″E

Architecture
- Style: Chinese architecture
- Established: Zhengtong period (1436–1449)

Tongwadian (simplified Chinese: 铜瓦殿; traditional Chinese: 銅瓦殿; pinyin: Tóngwǎdiàn; lit. 'Copper Tile Hall'), also known as Jinding Temple (金顶寺; 金頂寺; 'Gold Summit Temple'), is a Buddhist temple located on Mount Jizu, in Dali Prefecture, Yunnan, China.

== History ==
The temple was originally built in the Zhengtong period (1436–1449) of the Ming dynasty (1368–1644). Because it located on the top of Mount Jizu, it also known as Gold Summit Temple.

During the Second Sino-Japanese War, the Śūraṅgama Pagoda was used as the navigation mark of The Hump.

In 1966, Mao Zedong launched the ten-year Cultural Revolution, the temple was completely destroyed in this massive movement, only the main hall and Śūraṅgama Pagoda survived.

It was inscribed to the National Key Buddhist Temple in Han Chinese Area List in 1983.

A modern restoration of the entire temple complex was carried out in 2000 under the leadership of Shi Weisheng (释惟圣).

== Architecture ==
The existing main buildings include the Shanmen, Four Heavenly Kings Hall, Mahavira Hall, Bell tower, Drum tower, Buddhist Texts Library, and Śūraṅgama Pagoda.

=== Śūraṅgama Pagoda ===
The 13-storey, 42-metre (138 ft) tall, quadrilateral-based Śūraṅgama Pagoda (楞严塔) was built in 1641 in the reign of Chongzhen Emperor in the late Ming dynasty (1638–1644). Its name is derived from Śūraṅgama Sūtra.
