= Hongluo Temple =

Buddhist temple in Beijing, China

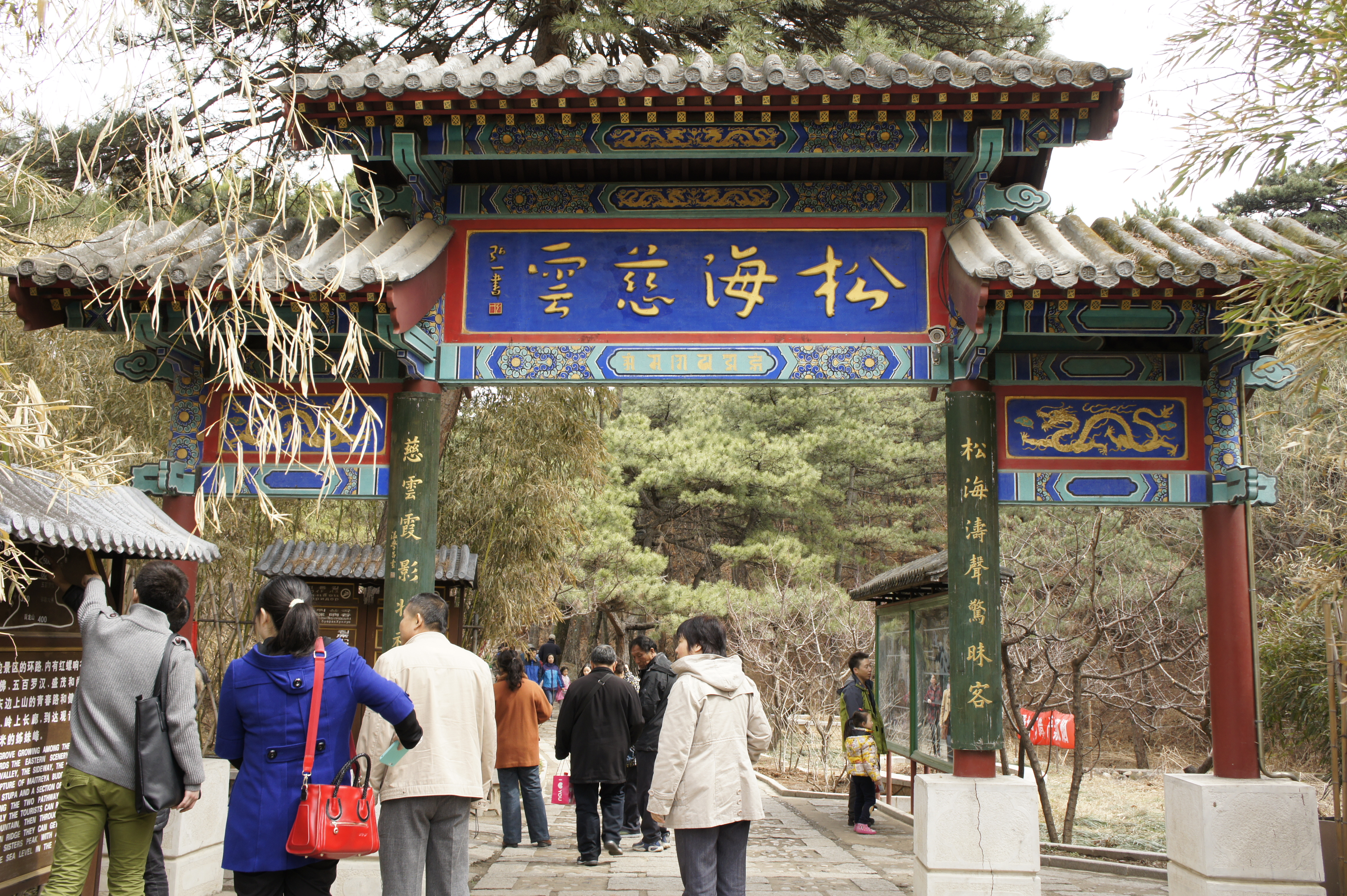
- Entrance to the Hongluo Temple

Religion
- Affiliation: Buddhism

Location
- Location: Beijing
- Country: China
- Interactive map of Hongluo Temple
- Coordinates: 40°22′32″N 116°37′13″E

The Hongluo Temple (Chinese: 红螺寺; pinyin: Hóngluó Sì; lit. 'Red Shells Temple') is one of the largest and most extensive Buddhist temples located in northern Beijing. It was first established during the Tang dynasty (618–907 AD); however, it was rebuilt many times later, notably during the Ming dynasty.

The temple is located at the southern foot of the Hongluo Mountain, and covers an area of 7 hectares (17 acres). Its name, Hongluo Temple, is also translated as "Red Snail Temple".

Today the temple is associated with the Pure Land tradition, having been the home of the Pure Land patriarchs Jixing Chewu and Yinguang.
