= Nianfo =

Mahayana Buddhist practice focused on Amitābha Buddha

念佛

Chinese name
- Traditional Chinese: 念佛
Transcriptions
Standard Mandarin
- Hanyu Pinyin: niànfó
Yue: Cantonese
- Jyutping: nim6 fat6
Southern Min
- Tâi-lô: liām-pu̍t

Vietnamese name
- Vietnamese: niệm Phật

Korean name
- Hangul: 염불
Transcriptions
- Revised Romanization: yeombul

Japanese name
- Kanji: 念仏
- Hiragana: ねんぶつ
Transcriptions
- Romanization: nenbutsu

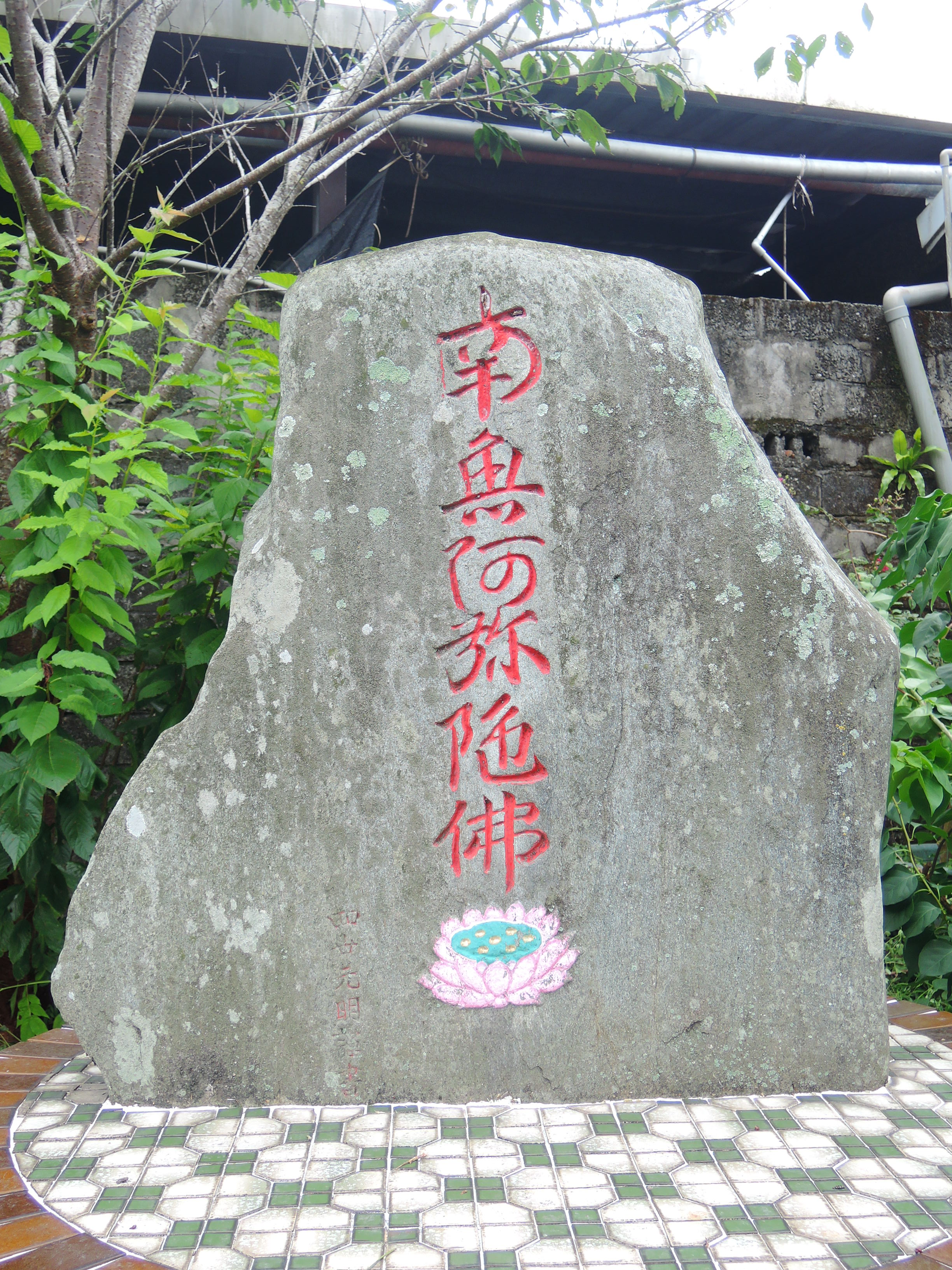
Chinese Nianfo carving

Nianfo (Chinese: 念佛, Japanese: 念仏; Korean: 염불, Vietnamese: niệm Phật) is a Buddhist practice central to East Asian Buddhism. The Chinese term nianfo is a translation of Sanskrit buddhānusmṛti ('recollection of the Buddha'), a classic Buddhist mindfulness (smṛti) practice.

Nianfo focused on the Buddha Amitābha is also the most important practice in Pure Land Buddhism. In the context of East Asian Pure Land practice, nianfo typically refers to the oral repetition of the name of Amitābha through the phrase "Homage to Amitabha Buddha" (南無阿彌陀佛; (Note: Mandarin: Nāmó Āmítuófó; Cantonese: naam4 mou4 aa3 nei4 to4 fat6; Japanese: Namu Amida Butsu; Korean: Namu Amitabul; Vietnamese: Nam-mô A-di-đà Phật) from Sanskrit Namo'mitābhāya Buddhāya). It can also refer to that phrase itself, in which case it may also be called the nianfo, or "The Name" (Japanese: myōgō 名号).

In most extant Pure Land traditions, faithfully reciting the name of Amitābha is mainly seen as a way to obtain birth in Amitābha's pure land of Sukhāvatī ('Blissful') through the Buddha's "other power". It is felt that reciting the nianfo can negate vast stores of negative karma as well as channel the power of the Buddha's compassionate vow to save all beings. Sukhāvatī is a place of peace and refuge. There, one can hear the Dharma directly from the Buddha and attain Buddhahood without being distracted by the sufferings of samsara.

In some contexts, the term nianfo can also refer to other meditative practices, such as various visualizations or the recitations of other phrases, dharanis, or mantras associated with Pure Land Buddhism, the Buddha Amitābha and his attendant bodhisattvas.

== Origins ==
Mindfulness of the Buddha (buddhānusmṛti) is a practice found in the Early Buddhist Texts as part of the ten recollections. The practice appears in Pali Canon suttas like Anguttara Nikaya (AN) 11.11, 11.12, and 1.296 as a method that can lead to samādhi and ultimately nirvana. Agamas like EA III, 1 (Taisho Vol. II, p. 554a7-b9) also discuss the practice as a method of focusing the mind on the Buddha and his qualities which can lead directly to attaining nirvana.

=== Indian Mahāyāna Buddhism ===
Indian Mahāyāna teachings developed the early Buddhist practices of buddhānusmṛti in more visionary directions. Some scholars like Andrew Skilton argue that Kashmiri Sarvāstivādin meditation masters influenced the development of more complex Mahayana meditations on the Buddhas.

A key feature of Mahāyāna buddhānusmṛti is that it was not restricted to Shakyamuni Buddha but could also be directed at other Buddhas, like Akṣobhya, Maitreya, and Amitābha Buddha. Groups of Mahāyāna sutras were composed based on these figures. With translations of these sūtras as well as the spread of Buddhism out of India, the practice of Mahāyāna buddhānusmṛti rapidly spread to Central Asia, Southeast Asia, and East Asia.

Hajime Nakamura writes that in the Indian Pure Land sūtras, Mindfulness of the Buddha (buddhānusmṛti) is the essential practice and consists of meditating upon Amitābha Buddha. Further, the practice of dedicating one's merit attained through such practices toward rebirth in a Buddha's pure buddha-field (Sanskrit: viśuddhabuddhakṣetra) became widespread as early as the 2nd century CE, with the Buddha Amitābha rising in prominence as a Buddha who had created a perfectly pure and easily accessible buddha-field.

=== Key Mahāyāna texts for East Asian Buddhism ===
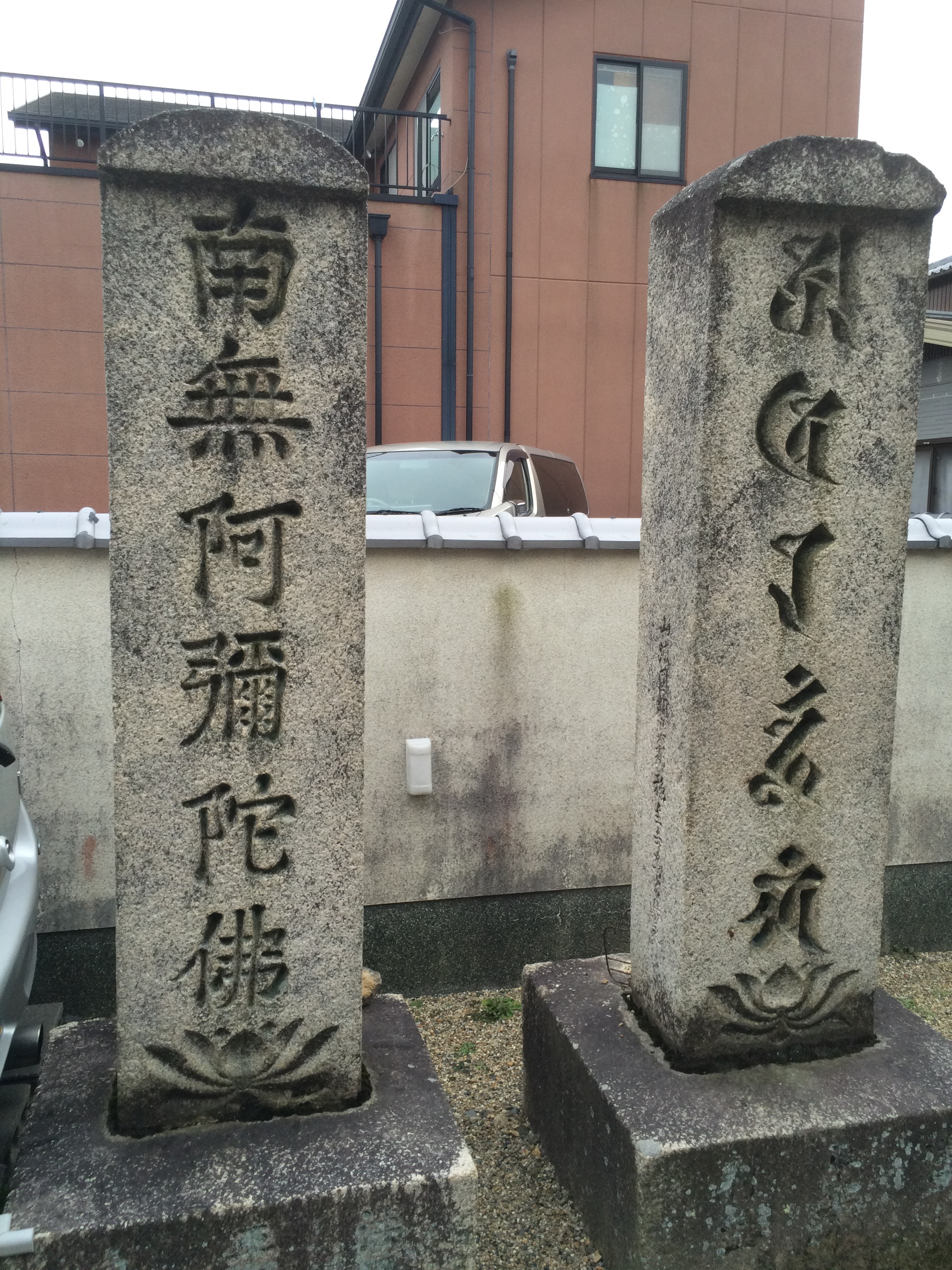
The Nembutsu in Chinese characters and the five-syllable mantra (aḥ vi ra hūṃ khaṃ) of Vairocana in Siddhaṃ script.

The earliest dated sutra translated into Chinese that describes Amitabha-focused nianfo (buddhānusmṛti) is the Pratyutpanna Samādhi Sūtra (1st century BCE), which is thought to have originated in ancient kingdom of Gandhāra. This sutra does not enumerate any vows of Amitābha or the qualities of his pure land, Sukhāvatī, but rather briefly describes the repetition of the name of Amitābha as a means to enter his realm through meditation.

Bodhisattvas hear about the Buddha Amitabha and call him to mind again and again in this land. Because of this calling to mind, they see the Buddha Amitabha. Having seen him they ask him what dharmas it takes to be born in the realm of the Buddha Amitabha. Then the Buddha Amitabha says to these bodhisattvas: 'If you wish to come and be born in my realm, you must always call me to mind again and again, you must always keep this thought in mind without letting up, and thus you will succeed in coming to be born in my realm.

Among the most frequently cited examples in East Asian Pure Land Buddhism is found in the Sutra on the Buddha of Immeasurable Life where Amitabha's vows are enumerated. The 18th, 19th and 20th vows state:

18. If, when I attain buddhahood, sentient beings in the lands of the ten directions who sincerely and joyfully entrust themselves to me, desire to be born in my land, and think of me even ten times should not be born there, may I not attain perfect enlightenment. Excluded, however, are those who commit the five grave offenses and abuse the Right Dharma.

19. If, when I attain buddhahood, sentient beings in the lands of the ten directions who awaken aspiration for enlightenment, do various meritorious deeds, and sincerely desire to be born in my land, should not, at their death, see me appear before them surrounded by a multitude of sages, may I not attain perfect enlightenment.

20. If, when I attain buddhahood, sentient beings in the lands of the ten directions who, having heard my Name, concentrate their thoughts on my land, plant roots of virtue, and sincerely transfer their merits toward my land with a desire to be born there should not eventually fulfill their aspiration, may I not attain perfect enlightenment.

And this passage in the Shorter Sukhāvatīvyūha Sūtra (Taisho no. 366):

O Śāriputra, beings do not arise in the buddha-land of Amitāyus Tathāgata by insignificant wholesome roots. O Śāriputra, whichever son of good family or daughter of good family, will hear the name of that bhagavān, Amitāyus Tathāgata, and having heard it will think of it, or will think of it with a mind that is undistracted for one night, or two nights, or three nights, or four nights, or five nights, or six nights, or seven nights, when that son of good family or daughter of good family will die, at their time of death, that Amitāyus Tathāgata, surrounded by a saṅgha of śrāvakas and headed by a chain of bodhisattvas will stand before them and they will die with an undisturbed mind. Having died, they will arise in the world system Sukvāvatī, the buddha-land of just that Amitāyus Tathāgata.

Lastly, one passage from the Sutra on the Contemplation of Amitāyus (Taishō 365) was also particularly influential on East Asian Pure Land authors (Amitāyus is an alternative name for Amitābha). This passage says that even sentient beings who commit the "five grave offenses" (which include killing one's parents) and other very evil acts can be reborn in the Pure Land (though in the lowest stage of birth). It also explains how one's assurance of birth in the Pure Land may be attained before death:

When he is about to die, he may meet a good teacher, who consoles him in various ways...but he is too tormented by pain to do so. The good teacher then advises him, "If you cannot concentrate on the Buddha then you should say instead, 'Homage to Amitāyus Buddha.'" In this way, he sincerely and continuously says, "Homage to Amitāyus Buddha" ten times.... When he comes to die, he sees before him a golden lotus flower like the disk of the sun, and in an instant he is born within a lotus bud in the Land of Utmost Bliss.

In the Sanskrit editions, phrases related to nianfo in the Sukhāvatīvyūha include "producing a thought directed toward a vision of Amitabha" (cittam utpādayanty amitābhasya...darśanāya) and "hearing the name" (buddhanāmaṣravaṇena). The shorter sutra speaks of hearing the name and "keeping it in mind" (manasikara). The Sanskrit edition of the longer sutra also speaks of "remembering [the Buddha] with a faithful mind" (prasannacittā māmanusmareyuḥ) and "obtaining even as little as one moment of a serene thought about the Tathagata" (hīnādhimuktikā bhaviṣyanti ye 'ntaśaekacittaprasādamapi tasmiṃstathāgate).

There are a few other influential sources on East Asian nianfo practice, including the Teaching of Manjusri 700 Line Prajñāpāramitā Sutra (Mañjuśrīparivartāparaparyāyā Saptaśatikāprajñāpāramitā), Vasubandhu's Discourse on the Pure Land (浄土論; Jìngtǔ lùn), the "Chapter on Purifying a Buddha-land" in the Dà zhìdù lùn (Great Prajñāpāramitā Commentary), and the "easy path" chapter in Nagarjuna's *Dasabhumikavibhāsā (十住毘婆沙論; Shí zhù pípóshā lùn, T.1521).

These various Mahayana sources were particularly important for the East Asian Pure Land Buddhist tradition, which is the set of beliefs and practices centered around the idea that all beings, even the most ordinary people, can attain birth in the Pure Land through the power of Amitābha Buddha. This tradition centered its practices on the nianfo. These sources were also influential on other Chinese traditions that practiced nianfo, including Chan and Tiantai.

== Nianfo in China ==
In Chinese translations of Buddhist Mahayana sources, the most common character for smṛti ("mindfulness", "recollection") became 念 (niàn), and thus recollection of the Buddha became niànfó. The character 念 generally means to think, recall, contemplate, mentally focus, or even "long for". But the term is ambiguous and can also mean to recite texts aloud so as to memorize them as well as meaning "a moment in time".

In China, nianfo became an important "dharma-gate" (fǎmén 法門), taught by numerous traditions and Buddhist masters. Perhaps one of the earliest well-known Chinese practitioners of nianfo was Huiyuan, who practiced mindfulness of the Buddha as taught in the Pratyutpanna Samādhi Sūtra so as to have a vision of Buddha Amitābha.

Nianfo was also taught by the founder of Tiantai Buddhism, patriarch Zhiyi (538–597). In his Mohe Zhiguan, Zhiyi taught a practice he named Constantly Walking Samadhi (chángxíng sānmèi 常行三昧), in which one walks in a ritualized manner while visualizing Amitabha and reciting his name for up to 90 days.

=== The Chinese Pure Land tradition ===
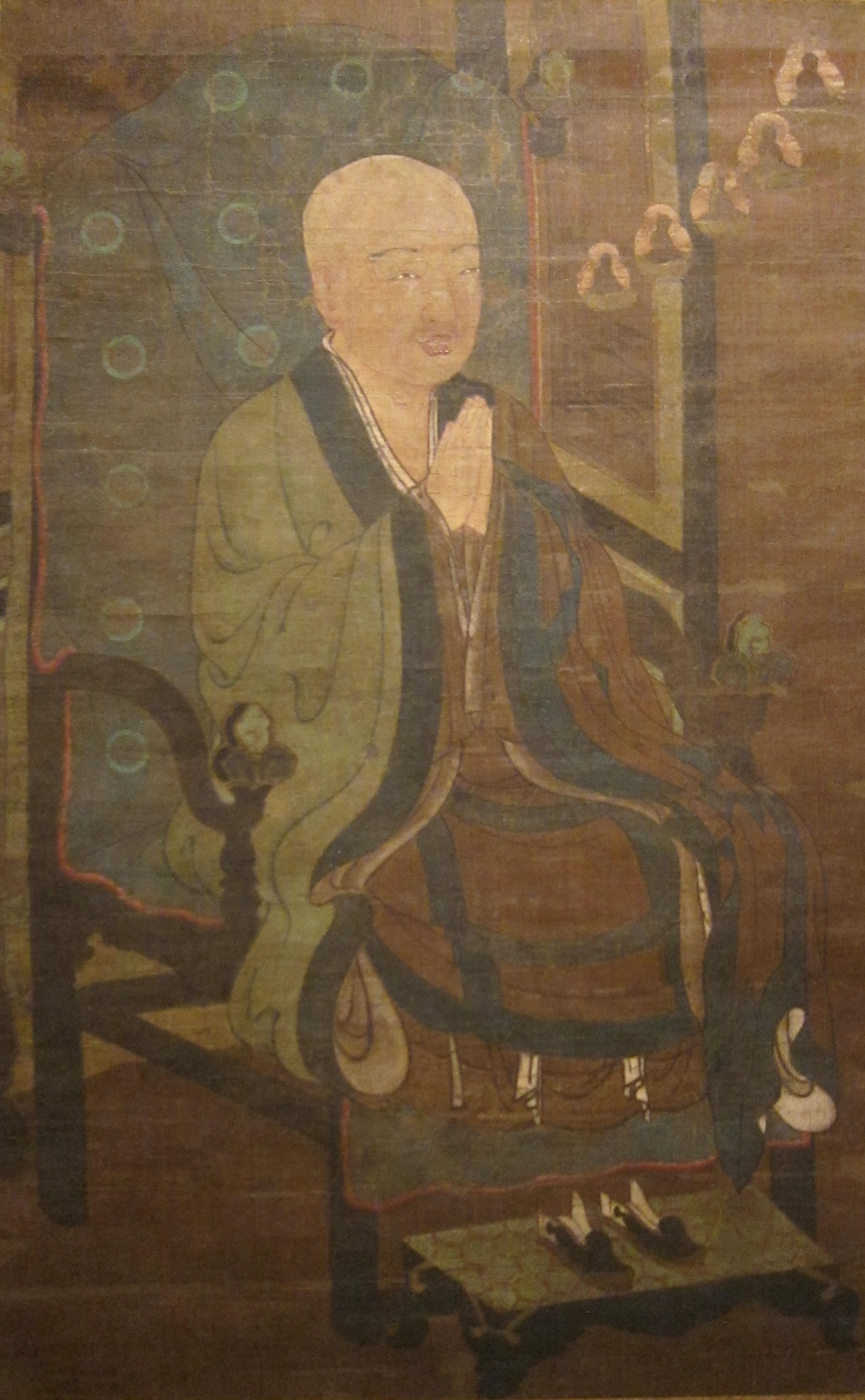
Portrait of the Chinese Pure land patriarch Shandao reciting "the nianfo" (Amitabha's name)

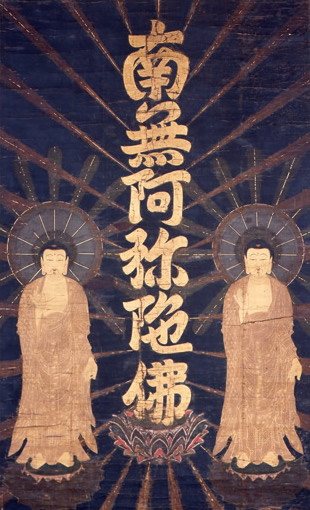
The six Chinese characters of the nianfo, resting on a lotus, flanked by Sakyamuni and Amitabha

Early Chinese Pure Land figures like Tanluan (476–542) and Daochuo (562–645) promoted nianfo as a way to achieve rebirth in the Pure Land of Amitabha. Tanluan taught that, through nianfo, which included visualizing Amitabha and reciting his name with faith, one could tune into the "other power" of this Buddha, which could purify one's mind and take one to the Pure Land of Sukhavati. Tanluan also taught that one could practice nianfo simply by holding Amitabha's name in one's mind as an image of the sound. He argued that Amitabha's name contained the full reality of that Buddha and that one could contemplate the Buddha just by contemplating the name.

The main innovation of Tanluan's student Daochuo was that the world is entering the "last days of the Dharma". In this degenerate era, practices that rely solely on "self-power" (zìlì 自力) are no longer effective. As such, the only truly effective way to attain Buddhahood is to practice nianfo and rely on the "other power" (tālì 他力) of Amitabha. Like Tanluan, Daochuo recommended a simple practice of meditating on Amitabha's name (rather than focusing on complex visualizations). He also introduced the practice of counting one's nianfo contemplations with the beads of a mala.

While these early Chinese Pure Land authors taught nianfo as mostly a mental "holding of the name", Shandao (7th century) interpreted nianfo to refer to the oral recitation of Amitabha's name. For Shandao, the nianfo of "orally holding Amitāyus's name" (kǒuchēng Mítuó mínghào 口稱彌陀名號) was Pure Land Buddhism's main practice. All other practices were merely auxiliary. These auxiliaries include visualization of Amitabha and his Pure Land, worshiping Amitabha, praising him, and making offerings to him. Over time, the term niànfó came to refer to Amitabha's name itself.

While Shandao taught these auxiliary practices, he also held that reciting Amitabha's name ten times was sufficient for rebirth in Sukhavati. Nevertheless, the Pure Land tradition considered constant lifelong practice useful, since one could improve one's stage of rebirth in the Pure Land and thus attain Buddhahood faster once there (while those who did no practice would likely be born in the lower level). Shandao also practiced visualizations taught in the Amitayus Contemplation Sutra and taught this method of Buddha recollection to his disciples.

The recitation of the nianfo was particularly critical for the dying and quickly became a major deathbed practice in Chinese Buddhism. For example, in The Meritorious Dharma Gate of the Samādhi Involving Contemplation of the Ocean-like Marks of the Buddha Amitābha (阿彌陀佛相海三昧功德法門; Ēmítuófó xiāng hǎi sānmèi gōngdé fǎmén), Shandao prescribes a specific set of rituals and practices (including visualization techniques) to help dying Buddhist devotees avoid bad rebirths and attain rebirth in the Pure Land. He also taught of the many dangers that could hinder a dying aspirant's rebirth in the Pure Land in his Correct Mindfulness for Rebirth at the Moment of Death (臨終往生正念文; Línzhōng wǎngshēng zhèngniàn wén). These sources reflect a traditional Chinese concern about various more complicated requirements for rebirth in the Pure Land, which include but are not limited to the recitation of Amitābha's name on one's deathbed.

The well-known form of the nianfo (na-mo a-mi-tuo fo) was standardized by a later Pure Land patriarch, Fazhao (died c. 820). Fazhao also promoted the melodic "five stage nianfo" (五會念佛) method, and taught nianfo at the imperial court. This method involves five different ways of chanting the nianfo phrase: in a slow sonorous way, slow but rising in pitch, moderate tempo, gradually accelerating in tempo, and chanting only Amituofo very rapidly.

Later Chinese Pure Land patriarchs were known for their syncretism of nianfo recitation with Chan meditation. The "dual path of Chan and Pure Land cultivation" is an important feature of Chinese Buddhism, which often combines nianfo with Chan Buddhist meditation. Figures considered Pure Land patriarchs who also combined nianfo with Chan include Yongming Yanshou (904–975) and Yunqi Zhuhong (1535–1615). Zhuhong was a learned figure who argued that the goal of Pure Land nianfo practice was "nianfo samādhi" (Ch.: nianfo sanmei), a "single, unperturbed mind" focused on Amitabha Buddha in which one realizes that the Buddha is one's own pure and empty mind. According to Zhuhong:

To contemplate the Buddha (nianfo) is to contemplate the mind (nianxin). Birth there (in the Pure Land) does not entail birth away from here. Mind, Buddha, and sentient beings are all of one substance; the middle stream (nonduality) does not abide on the two banks (this world and the Pure Land).

Zhuhong taught that one could attain these realizations even through simple nianfo methods, though he taught simple and complex methods according to his student's needs.

=== In other traditions ===
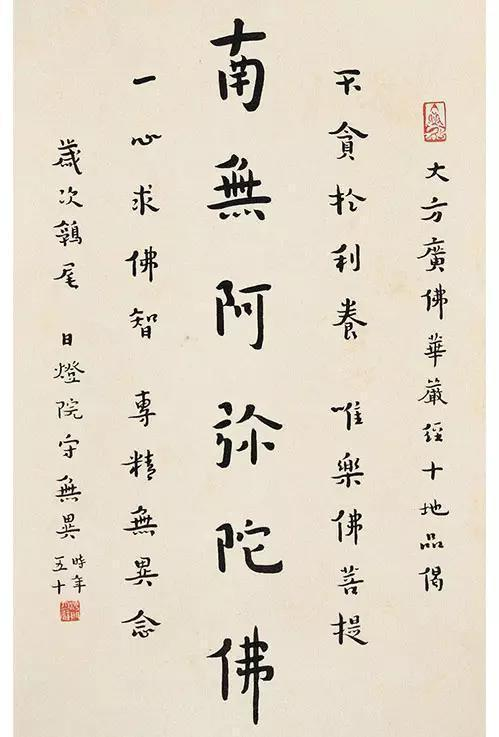
Calligraphy of the nianfo and two gathas, by Vinaya Master Hongyi

The practice of nianfo was also widely practiced in other schools of East Asian Buddhism, including in the Chan / Zen traditions and in the Tiantai (Lotus) and Huayan (Avatamsaka) schools. Tiantai nianfo practices were part of the tradition since its founding by Zhiyi. Later figures like Shengchang (959–1020), Siming Zhili, (960–1028), and Ciyun Zunshi (964–1032) popularized nianfo practice by founding lay "lotus societies" (lianshe). Tiantai authors also wrote works on Pure land nianfo practice like Zongxiao’s (1151–1214) Lèbāng wénlèi 樂邦文類 (Anthology of the Land of Bliss, T.1969A).

The earliest sources of the Chinese Chan school discuss nianfo practice as a Chan meditation method. The works of the Chan patriarchs like Daoxin (580–651) and Shenxiu teach nianfo meditation. The Chuanfa Baoji (傳法寶記; lit. "Annals of the Transmission of the Dharma Jewel"; Taisho no. 2838, c. 713), one of the earliest Chan histories, shows the practice of nianfo was widespread in the early Chan generation of Hongren, Faru and Datong. The practice is also mentioned in the early Chan monastic code titled The Rules of Purity in the Chan Monastery. Nianfo continued to be taught as a form of Chan meditation by later Chan figures like Yongming Yanshou, Zhongfen Mingben, and Hanshan Deqing. A later development in the dual Pure Land-Chan nianfo cultivation was the so-called "nianfo gong’an" which consisted of orally reciting nianfo as normal while pausing from time to time to ask oneself "Who is performing nianfo?". This practice first appears during the time of Zhiche (?–1310) who is said to have attained an awakening by this method.

The Eminent monks of the Ming, such as Zhibo Zhenke and Yunqi Zhuhong (1535–1615), also taught on the unity of Chan and Pure land nianfo, as well as drawing on Huayan and Tiantai thought.

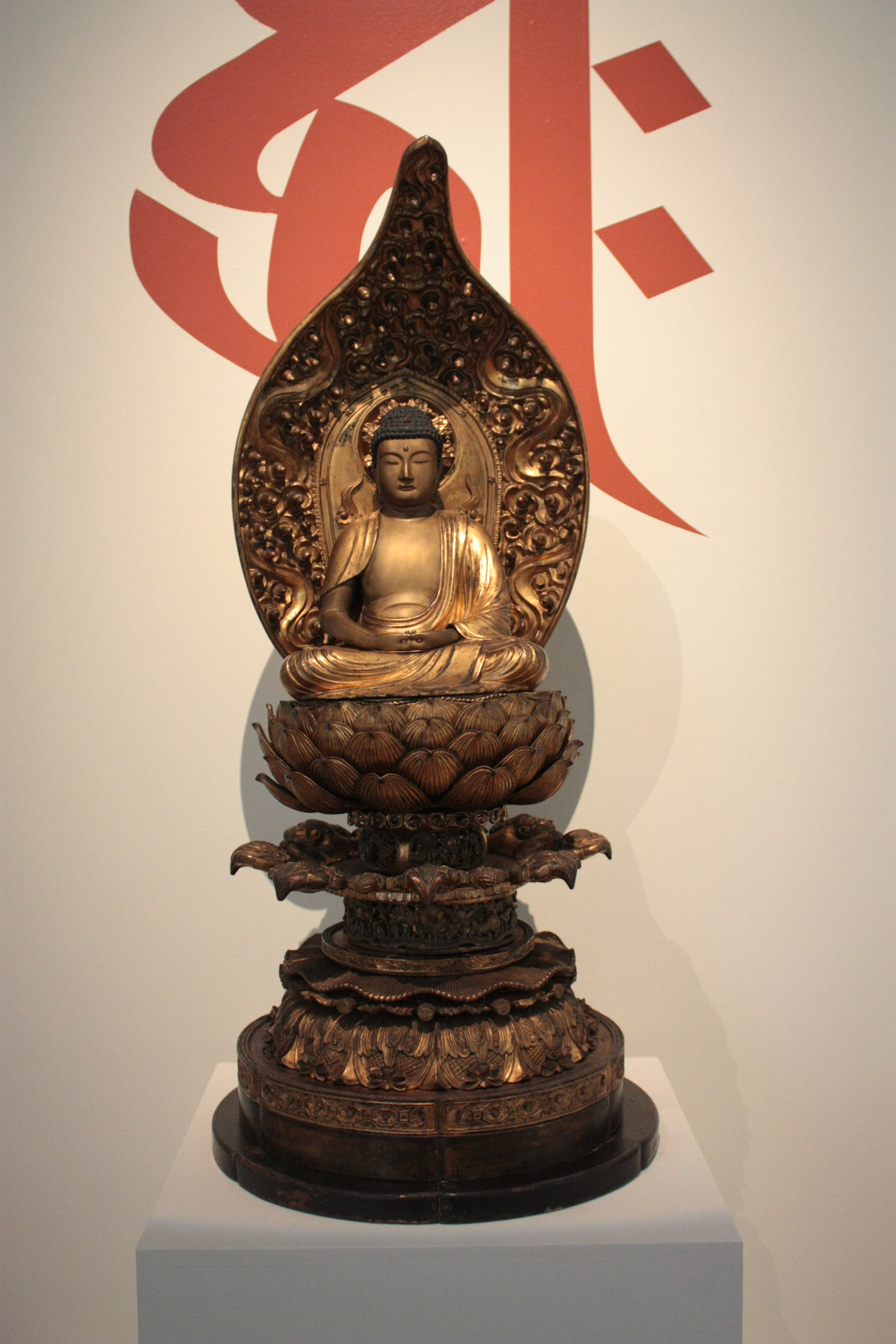
Amida Nyorai with esoteric seed syllable mantra

Nianfo and related practices for rebirth in the Pure Land of Amitabha was also practiced in Chinese esoteric Buddhism, though this tradition focused on the use of mantras and dharanis associated with Amitabha instead of the classic non-esoteric nianfo phrase "Namo Amitabha". Chinese translators of esoteric materials translated and composed various texts on Amitabha practice which made use of mantras and dharanis to achieve similar results as Mahayana nianfo practice (such as rebirth in the Pure Land). They include figures like Zhi Qian (c. 222–252, translated Taisho Tripitaka no. 1011, and T. 1356), Dharmakṣema (397–439, translated T. 157), Kālayaśas (c. 420–479, translated T. 1161), Śrīmitra (T. 1331), Vajrabodhi (671–741, T. 932), and Amoghavajra (705–774). Amoghavajra translated various related texts including The Method of Contemplating and Making Offerings to Amitāyus Tathāgata Vidhi (T. 930), among others (T. 930, 933, 950, 1056, 1064, 1069, 1155).

Qing era Huayan school authors like Baiting Xufa (1641–1728) and the lay literatus Peng Shaosheng (1740–1796) wrote on nianfo from a Huayan perspective, seeing Amitabha and Vairocana as the same Buddha, and as identical with the "one true mind" taught in Huayan. This teaching became known as the "Huayan-nianfo".

=== Modern Chinese Buddhism ===
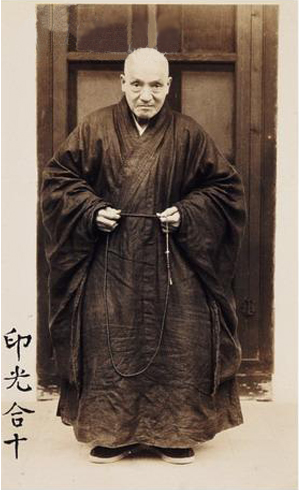
Photo of Yinguang

Nianfo remains a central practice of Chinese Buddhism. Master Yinguang (1862–1941) was particularly influential in the modern revival of Pure Land nianfo practice, drawing tens of thousands of students and leading a new Pure Land movement. Some modern figures like Venerable Jingkong (1927–2022) have focused on promoting an exclusive focus on nianfo practice, but others teach it as general part of Chinese Buddhism. In contemporary Chinese Buddhism, nianfo retreats are a common part of the regular repertoire offered by Buddhist temples, alongside Chan meditation retreats and sutra classes.

Other important modern Chinese teachers of nianfo practice include Venerable Guangqin (1892–1986), Master Xuanhua (1918–1995), Dharma Master Huijing (1950-) and Dharma Master Jingzong (1966-, Abbot of Hongyuan Monastery).

Aside from being a popular chant and meditation, the nianfo is also seen as auspicious and is written and reproduced in many ways including calligraphy scrolls, public inscriptions, charms, amulets, and altarpieces. One particularly modern piece of Buddhist material culture is the nianfo-ji (nianfo machine, 念佛機). These are small electronic devices which contain various digital recordings of nianfo chants which have become quite popular in Chinese Buddhism.

Modern Chan figures like Nan Huai-Chin also made use of the nianfo as a meditation tool and as a way to attain samādhi. Modern Chan masters like Xuyun (1840?–1959) also taught nianfo it as a kind of Chan huatou practice.

== In Korea ==
Korean Buddhism traditionally sees the practice of nianfo as part of "Three Gates" (K.: sammun) doctrine. This teaching places nianfo alongside Seon (Zen) meditation and doctrinal study as necessary parts of a holistic Buddhist practice. The three are considered to be mutually reinforcing elements of Buddhist cultivation, like three legs on a tripod.

The practice of yeombul (nianfo) was adopted from Chinese Buddhist sources during the Unified Silla (668–935). Wŏnhyo (617–686) was the most influential figure in promoting this practice among the wider populace. Wŏnhyo's nianfo method draws on numerous sources including Zhiyi and Tanluan. Later Pure Land authors who write on nianfo practice all rely on Wŏnhyo's teachings. According to Wŏnhyo's Muryangsu-gyŏng chongyo (無量壽經宗要, Doctrinal Essentials of the Sūtra on the Visualization of Immeasurable Life), the most important element of the practice of nianfo is to recite the name with bodhicitta and with a sincere repentant mind (K: chisim, 至心).

Another important Korean exponent of nianfo practice is Uisang (625–702), who wrote a commentary on the Amitabha sutra, the Amit'a-gyŏng ŭigi (阿彌陀經義記 The meaning of the Amituo jing).

== Nembutsu in Japan ==
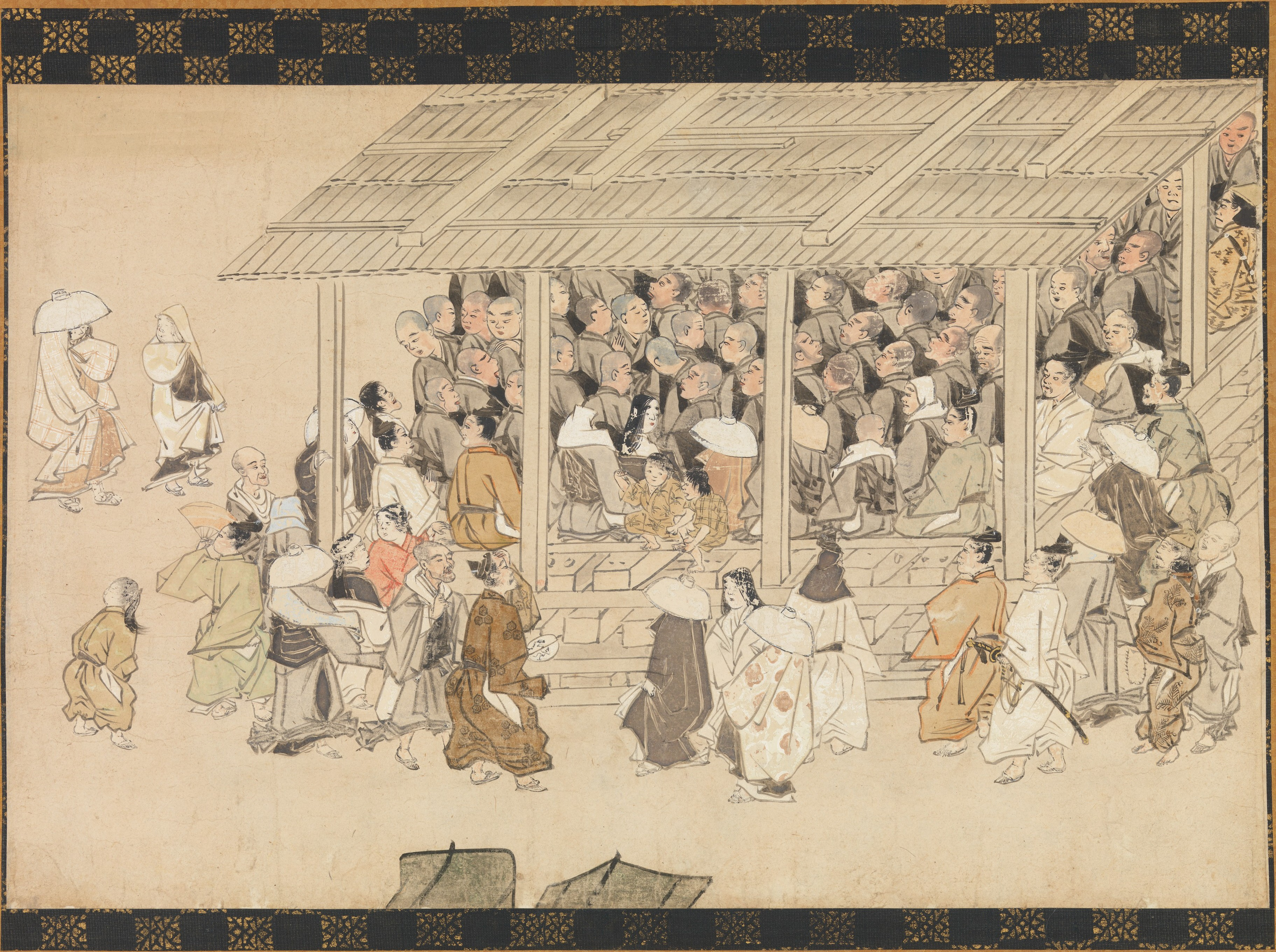
A Nenbutsu Gathering in Kyoto, from the Illustrated Biography of the Monk Ippen and His Disciple Ta'a (Yugyō Shōnin engi-e)

Chinese teachings on the practice of nianfo (in Japanese: nembutsu) were adopted into Japanese Buddhism. One of the earliest accounts of Japanese nembutsu practice is found in the works of Chikō (709–770 or 781), a monk of the Sanron (East Asian Madhyamaka) school. Chikō's commentary on Vasubandhu's Pure Land Treatise divides nembutsu into two main categories: meditative and vocal. The meditative nembutsu involved either visualizing the form of Amitabha, including imagining all his physical marks one by one, or one could merely contemplate the wisdom and compassion of Amitabha. The vocal nembutsu was considered an easier practice for those who lacked concentration. Both practices were considered to be able to lead to absorption (samādhi).

The nembutsu was also important in the Tendai school, the Japanese branch of Tiantai which relied on meditation practices taught in Zhiyi's Mohe Zhiguan. The Tendai monk Genshin (942–1017) popularized the nembutsu in his Ōjōyōshū (Essential Anthology on Attaining Rebirth), which argues that the nembutsu is the most efficacious practice in this time of Dharma decline (mappō). For Genshin, meditative nembutsu as a visualization was most important. This meant contemplating the physical form of Amitābha, though if that is too difficult for someone, they could just visualize one of his physical features, like the curled tuft of white hair between his eyes. Genshin also taught that one could not practice this, oral recitation was just as effective in leading to birth in the Pure Land.

Furthermore, during the Later Heian (950–1185), various itinerant ascetics and preachers traveled the country promoting the simple recitation of the nembutsu. These holy people (hijiri) who were also called shōnin, were mostly independent of major Buddhist institutions. The most well known of these figures was Kūya (903–972), who wandered throughout the provinces preaching on nembutsu practice.

=== The Pure Land sects ===
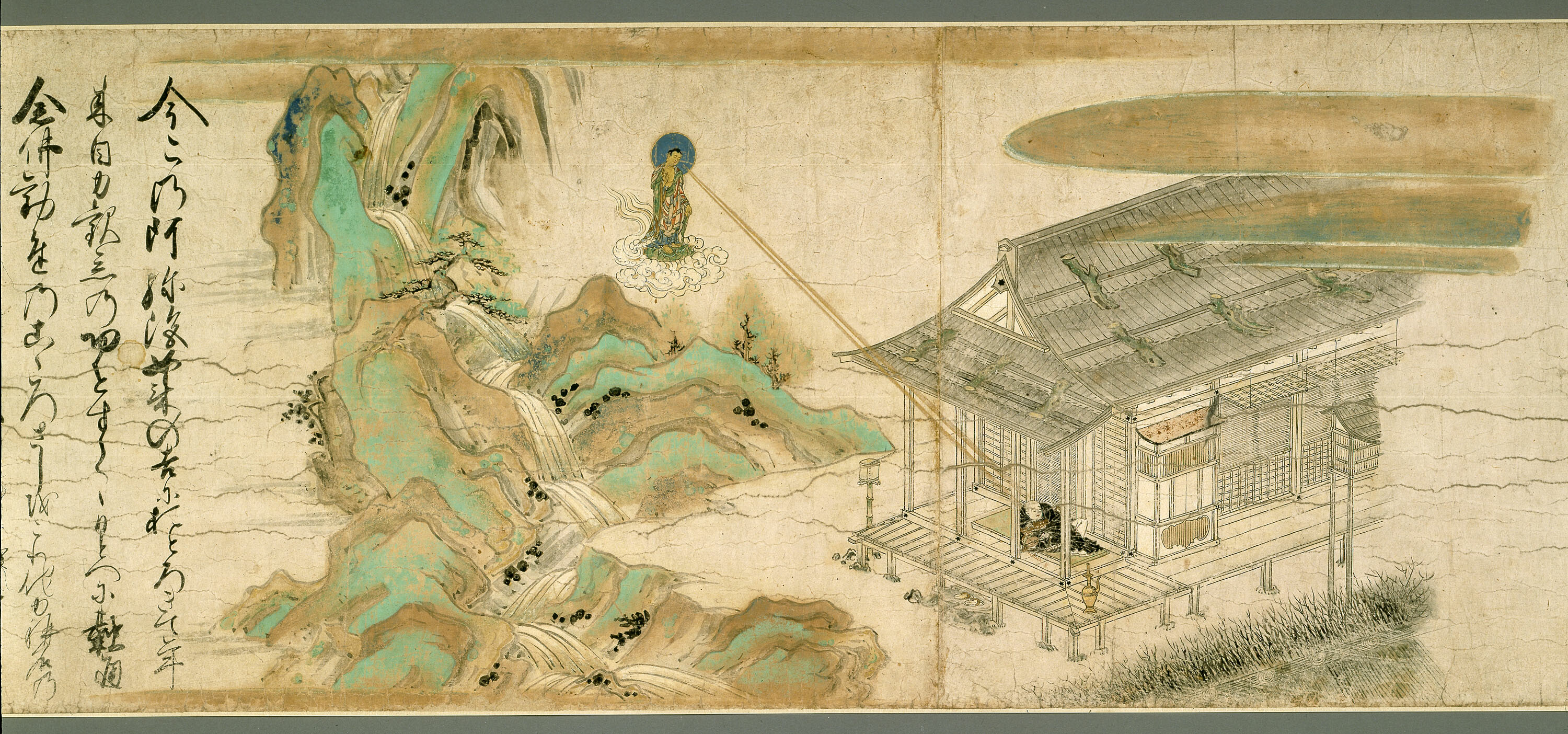
An illustration from the Yūzū Nembutsu Engi Emaki which depicts a vision of Amitabha Buddha to a nembutsu reciter of the Yūzū Nembutsu school

By the end of the 12th century, distinctive sects focused exclusively on the practice of nembutsu as a verbal recitation for the purposes of being reborn in the Pure Land arose. These new Pure Land (jodo) schools were part of the New Kamakura Buddhism. They include Honen's (1133–1212) Jōdo-shū, Shinran's (1173–1263) Jodo Shinshu and smaller sects like Ryōnin's (1072–1132) Yūzū Nembutsu and Ippen's Ji-shu. The new Pure Land schools often held that the world had entered the era of the decline of the Dharma (mappō) and that only the Pure land practice of reciting the nembutsu was useful for attaining liberation (after rebirth in the Pure Land).

Ryōnin's Yūzū Nembutsu sect was the first Japanese Pure Land sect which focused on nembutsu practice. Ryōnin's understanding of the nembutsu was influenced by the Huayan concept of perfect interfusion and the interconnectness of all phenomena. He held that the chanting of the nembutsu influenced all people and all things. He began a register where people would sign up and commit to a certain number of nembutsu recitations per day, the idea being that all people in the register would receive the collective benefit of these combined recitations. This practice became popular, and even the Japanese emperor entered the register.

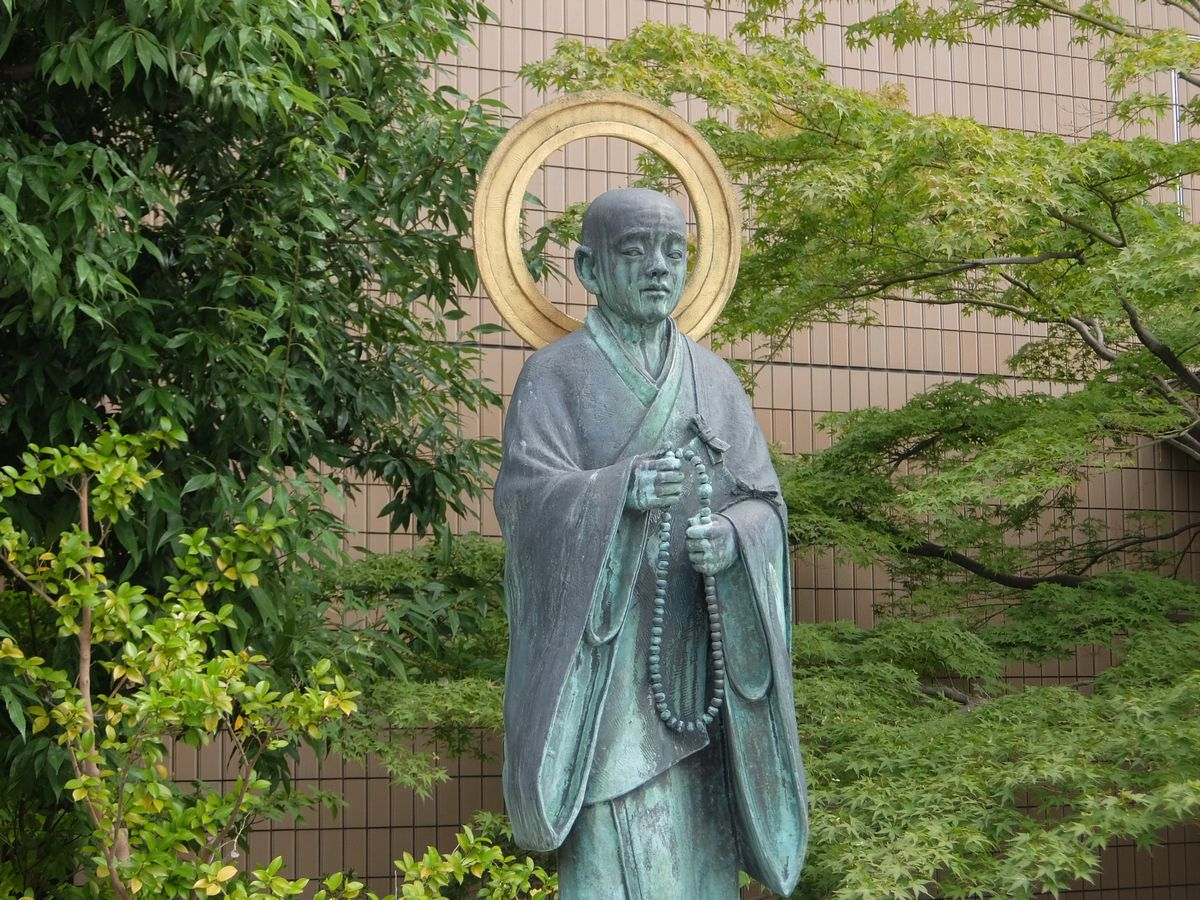
Statue of Hōnen in Bukkyo University

Hōnen (1133–1212) is perhaps the most important figure in the history of Japanese nembutsu practice. His study of Pure land literature, especially Shandao, convinced him that Pure Land practice was the only effective practice for the degenerate age. This view led to various reactions among other Buddhist schools at the time and Hōnen's sect was fiercely attacked at times. The Tendai school argued that this teaching disparaged other Buddhist practices and managed to have the exclusive practice of nembutsu banned by the government for a period of time (c. 1207). The ban was lifted in 1211. In spite of these setbacks, Hōnen's new Jōdo (Pure Land) school thrived.

Hōnen was widely criticized for teaching that only nembutsu was an efficacious Buddhist practice, an idea that became known as the "exclusive nembutsu" (専修念仏, senju nembutsu). However, his view is more nuanced than simple exclusivity. Even though Hōnen saw the nembutsu as the supreme practice, he did not actually teach that only the oral recitation of the nembutsu was useful. He merely taught that this was the simplest, most accessible and effective practice taught by the Buddha. It was the only one that always works. As Jones writes, for Hōnen "to become a buddha, one first needed to be reborn in the Pure Land, and for this the oral nenbutsu was the only reliable expedient. One thus had to begin with it. After one had established oneself in this practice with firm faith, one could then reintroduce the other [auxiliary] practices that aimed at rebirth there as a way of enriching the practice of oral recitation." Dr. Mark Blum similarly explains that Honen's view is not "exclusive nembutsu" but "prioritized nembutsu" in which the nembutsu becomes a "chosen practice" with a specially sacred status. As such, while Hōnen emphasized the oral nembutsu, he did still promote the practice of other forms of nembutsu (like visualization) as well as Shandao's auxiliary Pure land practices (including precepts, dedicating merit to birth, recitation of sutras, etc.).

After his death, Hōnen's disciples spread his teachings on the nembutsu throughout Japan. There was another religious persecution of his followers following the posthumous publication of Hōnen's secret Passages on the Selection of the Nembutsu in the Original Vow and many of Hōnen's writings (as well as his tomb) were destroyed by Tendai monks. While the imperial government exiled many of Hōnen's disciples to far off provinces with the intention of suppressing it, this just served to spread Hōnen's nembutsu teachings throughout Japan. There also were various views and debates on the nature of the nembutsu among Hōnen's followers, perhaps the most well known of which is the debate between once-calling (Jpn.: ichinengi, one only needs to say nembutsu once to be saved) and many-calling (Jpn.: tanengi, many times are needed).

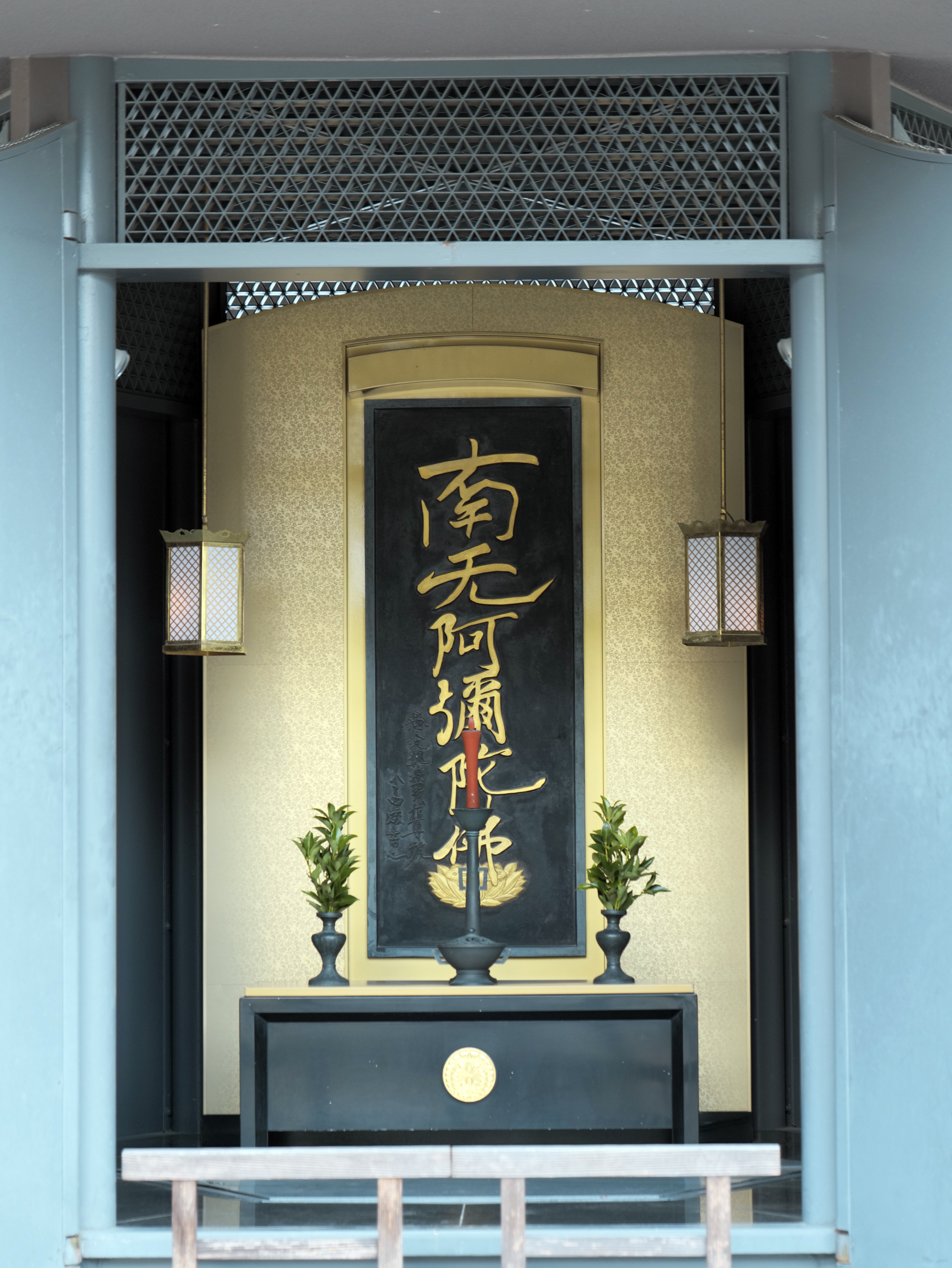
A nembutsu altar at a Jōdo Shinshū mausoleum in Higashiyama-ku, Kyoto

The most influential of Hōnen's students was Shinran (1173–1263), founder of the Jōdo Shinshū sect. Shinran's view of the nembutsu centered on the concept of true faith or total entrusting (Jpn.: shinjin), which was seen as a deep and transformative experience that arises spontaneously (jinen). With this state of mind, it did not matter how many times one recited the nembutsu. One was assured of birth if one had complete trust in Amitabha. Furthermore, all other practices were futile in attaining rebirth in the Pure land, only the nembutsu was efficacious in this. Shinran saw the nembutsu is itself nothing but the natural expression of shinjin. For those who do not yet have the settlement heart-mind of shinjin, one is to recite the nembutsu without any calculation or contrivance, and with a sense of gratitude to Amitabha. During his exile, Shinran married and remained a layperson. Many of his followers were laypeople. They formed congregations (montos) who chose their own leaders, and met in practice centers (dōjōs) instead of temples to recite the nembutsu.

One more influential Kamakura period teacher of the nembutsu was Ippen (1239–1289). Ippen argued that concerning oneself with faith was pointless, since one's own faith was just a kind of self-power. As such, Ippen argued that the nembutsu worked with or without faith on the side of the reciter. Like Tanluan, Ippen held that the Buddha was present in the very name of Amitabha, as his Dharmakaya was all pervasive. Reciting the name thus allowed one to realize the non-duality between oneself and Amitabha. Ippen went as far as to say that the recitation of the nembutsu brought one to the Pure Land here and now, that is, one moment of the nembutsu was a moment of the Pure Land. Ippen's teaching was quite popular, and his Ji-shu sect became the largest Pure Land sect in the fourteenth and fifteenth centuries. It then went into decline, but still survives as a minor sect.

=== Esoteric nembutsu ===
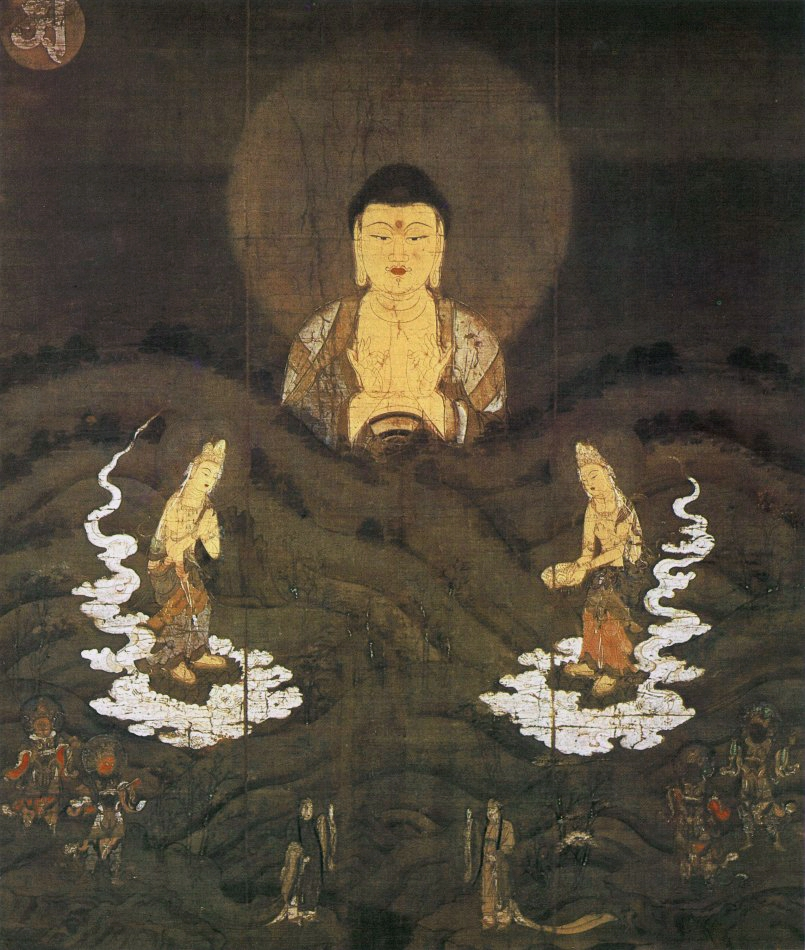
Descent of Amitabha over the Mountain or Yamagoe no Amida (山越えの阿弥陀), a cultural treasure from Eikando Temple. Note the seed syllable "a" for Amida on the upper-left.

Esoteric lineages of Japanese Buddhism, especially in the Shingon tradition, also developed their own teachings on the nembutsu. Perhaps the earliest monk to call himself a "Nenbutsu-shū (Nianfo school)" monk, was the Shingon monk Eikan of Zenrinji, who emphasized nembutsu practice as a way to attain rebirth in Sukhavati. He even argued that nembutsu was the highest practice, even on the level of all other esoteric practices. Another important Shingon author on nembutsu was Chingai, who writes of the "essence of the pure [land] teachings," in his Ketsujō ōjō shū (決定往生集, T. 2684). He promoted the nembutsu along with the mantra of Amitabha and the Mantra of Light.

Later, the Shingon monk Kakuban (1095–1143) popularized an esoteric nembutsu teaching influenced by Pure Land and Shingon esotericism. His Mitsugon-in temple was a major site for the practice of nembutsu which became popular among hijiri (itinerant ascetics). Kakuban's Amida Hishaku (Esoteric Meaning of Amida) is an important exposition of esoteric Pure Land thought on nembutsu practice. For Kakuban, Amitabha is a manifestation of the all-pervasive Dharmakaya Mahavairocana. As such, the nembutsu is a powerful mantra that turns one's heart-mind towards an awareness of one's own innate buddha-nature, which is none other than the Dharmakaya itself, the fundamental empty consciousness at the ground of all things.

Another influential figure which developed the philosophy of esoteric nembutsu practice was Dōhan (1179–1252), the author of Himitsu nenbutsu shō (The Secret Meaning of Nembutsu). Dōhan's four layered esoteric understanding of the nembutsu as follows:

1. At level one, the literal level of meaning, there is the conventional truth of Amitabha as a being that created the Pure land as a place of refuge for all beings who say his name.
2. At this level of meaning, Amitabha is but one aspect of the cosmic Mahāvairocana Buddha, the Dharmakaya..
3. At the third level, Amitabha is the compassionate activity of ultimate reality itself and the universal doorway to liberation for all beings.
4. At the deepest most secret level, Amitabha is the true nature which is active within the body-mind of all living beings.

Dōhan goes as far as equating the nembutsu with one's heart-mind (shin), one's life, and breath. As such, whether one is awake or asleep, one is already engaged in the secret nembutsu through merely breathing. Thus, the esoteric nembutsu is not limited to actively chanting the name. Indeed, since he sees the nembutsu as all pervasive, Dōhan rejects the concept of "exclusive" recitation practice, and promotes a more diverse regime of Buddhist practices.

Secret nenbutsu (himitsu nenbutsu) teachings were influential outside of the Shingon school as well. They impacted the thought and practice of itinerant monks (hijiri) like Ippen. Esoteric nenbutsu ideas also influenced the rise of secretive movements (hiji bomon, secret dharmas) within Jodo Shinshu, such as kakushi nenbutsu (hidden nenbutsu) and kakure nenbutsu (hiding nenbutsu). Esoteric nembutsu teachings also influenced Seizan branch of Jodo-shu, founded by Johen (1166–1224) and Shōkū (證空, 1177–1247). Johen was originally a Shingon priest at Eikan-dō who had affinities with Pure Land practice. Later he converted to Jōdo-shū after reading Honen's works. This branch of Jodo-shu has been seen by modern scholars as being the source of the Pure Land tract Attaining the Settled Mind (Anjin ketsujō shō). This text has been influential in the Jodo Shinshu tradition.

=== Later developments ===
"Taiko Nembutsu" (nembutsu accompanied by drumming) practiced in Hakushima, Japan

The new Kamakura period Pure Land schools were extremely popular and influential. Other schools responded with various critiques of their nembutsu practice and with their own similar devotional teachings. One critic was the Kegon monk Myōe, who wrote two critical treatises against Honen's views. His central critique was that exclusive nembutsu practice lacked central Mahayana foundations, like bodhicitta (the mind aimed at awakening for the sake of all beings). Nevertheless, Myōe was also a promoter of simply reciting the Mantra of Light as a way to attain rebirth in Sukhavati. Similarly, the Yogacara figure Jōkei (1155–1213) responded to the widespread popularity of the nembutsu practice by promoting a similar series of simple devotional practices which relied on the other power of a Buddha, though he preferred to focus on Maitreya or Shakyamuni Buddha instead of Amitabha as the main object of devotion.

Later in Japanese history, the nembutsu would also become popular in Japanese Zen, influenced by the rise of the Ōbaku lineage, introduced by Ingen (1592–1673), who followed a Chinese Linji tradition which promoted Chan-Pure Land dual cultivation. Nenbutsu practice was also taught in the other schools of Japanese Zen at certain times in its history, though this was not without controversy. For example, the Rinzai master Ungo Kiyō (1582–1659), was famous for having taught nembutsu. He wrote a work on the practice, called the Ōjōyōka. This caused a controversy among his Rinzai peers, who even threatened him with expulsion. Since nembutsu practice had been condemned by the great Rinzai systematizer Hakuin Ekaku (1686–1769), this controversy cut to the core the Rinzai tradition's identity. During the Meiji period, Sōtō school priests also taught both Shaka nembutsu (Namu Shakamuni Butsu) and Amida nembutsu to the laity, seeking to promote an easy practice for regular people.

== In Vietnamese Buddhism ==
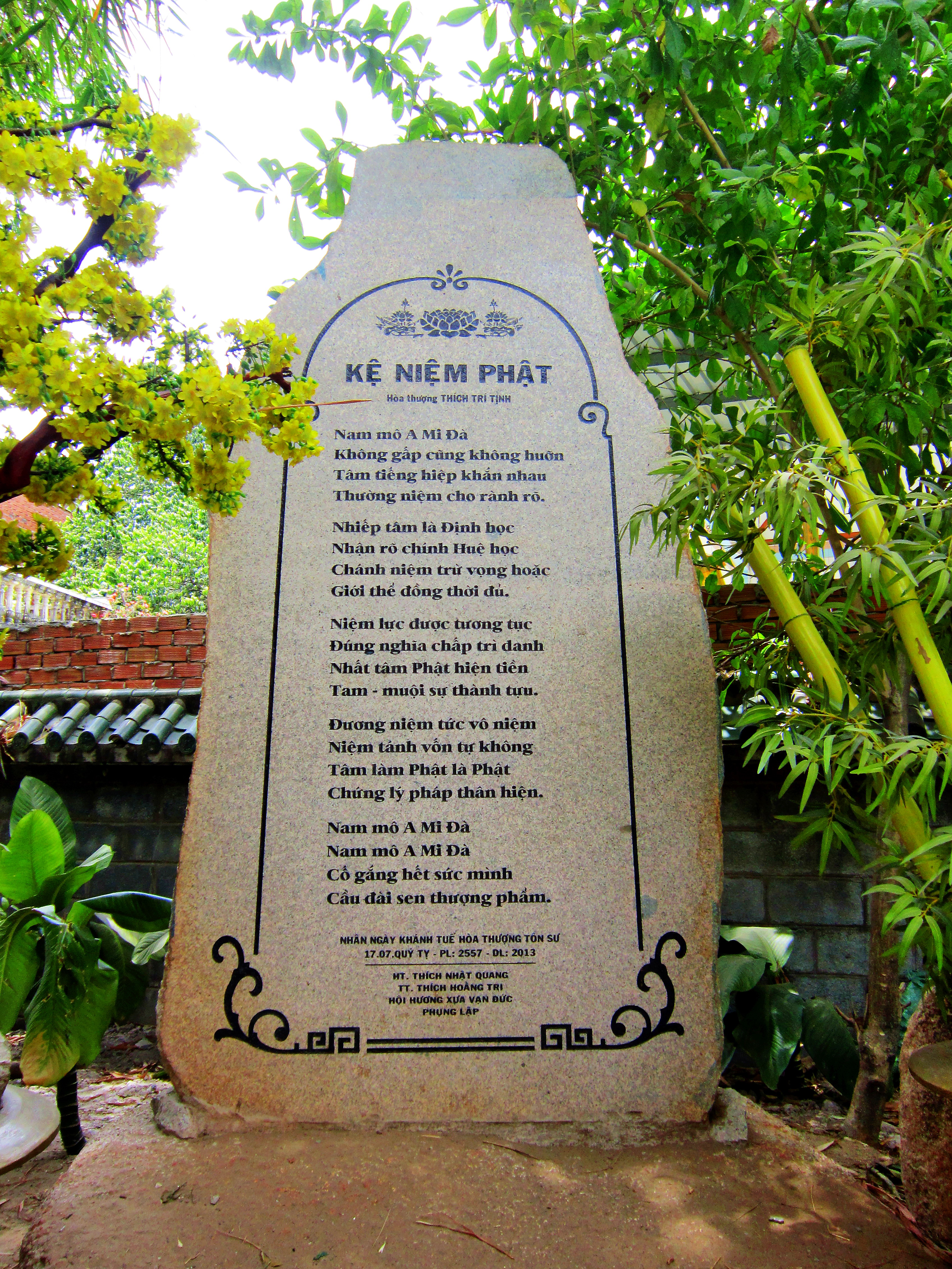
Verses for reciting the Buddha's name by Venerable Thích Trí Tịnh engraved on stone and erected in the grounds of Vạn Đức Pagoda in Thủ Đức, Ho Chi Minh City, Vietnam

Vietnamese Buddhism is an eclectic tradition which draws from all strains of Chinese Buddhism, including Chan and Pure Land. As such, the practice of "Niệm Phật" (the Vietnamese term for nianfo) is a common feature of modern Vietnamese Buddhist practice. The phrase "Nam mô A-di-đà Phật" or "Nam mô A Mi Đà" is often chanted in Vietnamese temples by monks and laypeople alike.

The nianfo method is often combined with Thiền meditation (i.e. zazen). Indeed, according to Thích Thiên-Ân, "at present the popular method of practice is meditation during recitation and recitation during meditation – meditation and recitation being one and the same for Vietnamese Buddhists". This Chan Nianfo dual practice is known as "union of Zen and Pure-Land recitation". One popular teacher of Vietnamese Pure Land nienfo practice was Thich Thien Tam. Some of his teachings have been translated into English, including the book Buddhism of Wisdom & Faith (1991).

Thích Quảng Đức, a South Vietnamese Mahāyāna monk who famously burned himself to death in an act of protest against the anti-Buddhist policies of the Catholic President Ngô Đình Diệm, said the nianfo as his last words immediately before death. He sat in the lotus position, rotated a string of wooden prayer beads, and recited the words "Nam mô A-di-đà Phật" before striking the match and dropping it on himself, continuing to recite Amitabha's name as he burned.

== Nianfo methods ==
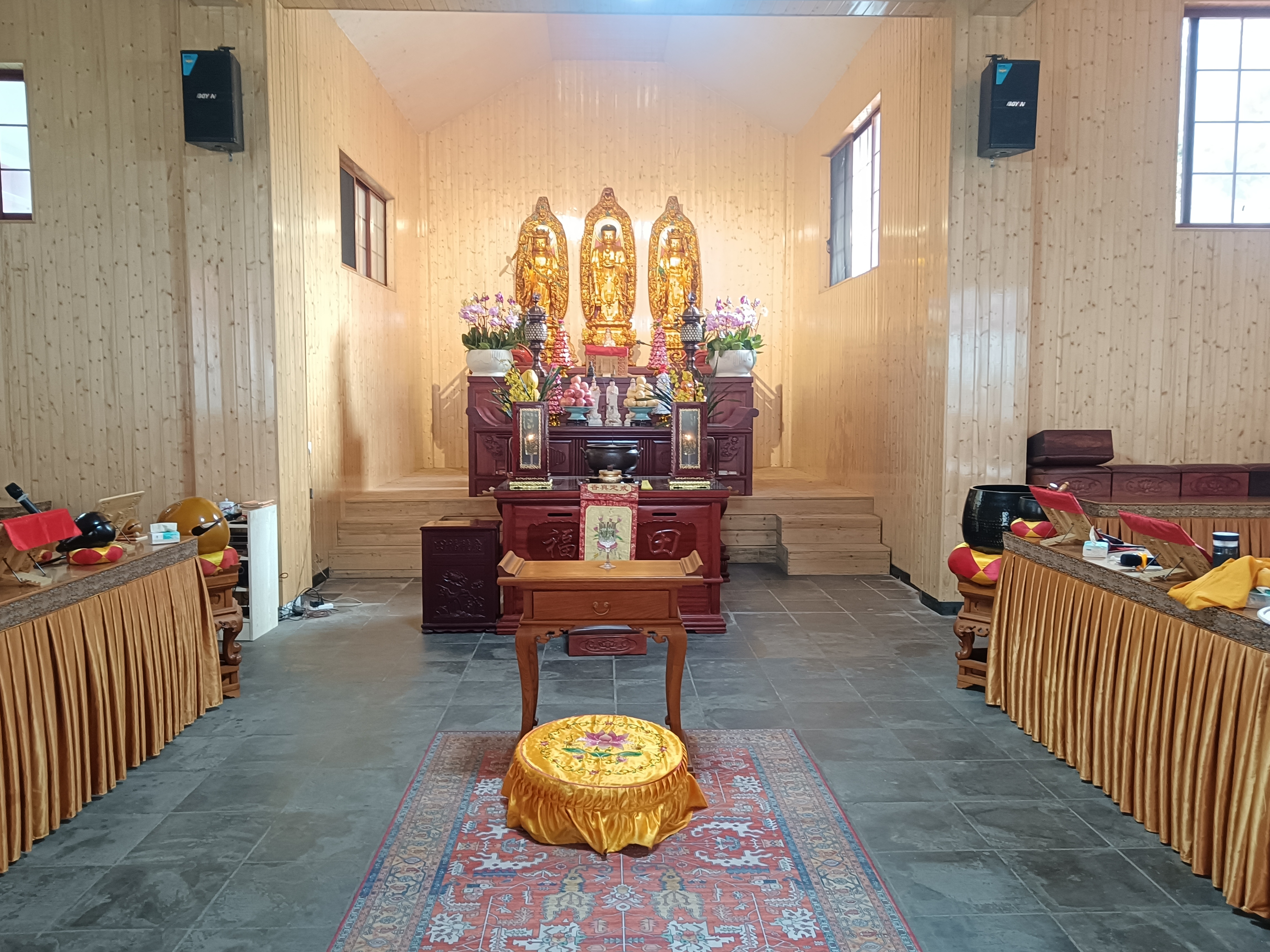
Nianfo hall, Baoning Temple

There are numerous ways of practicing nianfo in East Asian Buddhism. The most popular method in East Asian Pure Land Buddhism remains the simple oral recitation of the phrase Namo Amituo-fo (Jp: Namo Amida Bu, Namo Amitabha Buddha) or just the name itself "Amitofo" (Amitabha Buddha). The Japanese Pure Land sects of Jōdo-shū and Jōdo Shinshū tend to exclusively focus on the oral recitation of the nianfo.

Another widespread method is the mentally "holding the name" (Ch.: chi ming), in which one mentally contemplates the Buddha by repeating the name with one's inner voice. Yet another important form of nianfo in the Pure Land tradition are based on visualization (觀想). These include maintaining a mental image of Amitabha Buddha, looking at a physical Buddha statue or painting, and even meditating using the numerous visualization exercises taught in the Amitayus Contemplation Sutra. One Chinese master who taught nianfo along with visualization was Yìnguāng (1861–1940).

According to Thích Thiện Tâm, there are four major "types" of nianfo practice: (1) the practice of Pure Land nianfo alongside Chan/Zen practice; (2) practicing nianfo alongside the recitation of Mahayana sutras; (3) practicing nianfo alongside esoteric practices, such as mantra and dharani; (4) the exclusive practice of nianfo (either with visualization, or as oral recitation only).

Furthermore, Charles Jones discusses two main approaches to the various ways of practicing nianfo, the "medicine cabinet" approach and the "graded path" or "mārga" approach. The first approach sees the various nianfo methods as different skillful means, each of which can be useful for different individuals with different needs. It is the job of a Pure Land teacher to help a student select the method best suited to them. The medicine cabinet approach is exemplified by the following passage from Elder Suddhisukha's Taming the Monkey Mind: "The cultivator is not expected to follow all the methods presented in this volume, but rather to pick and choose according to his situation, level and circumstances. If a given method does not bring results quickly or is not suitable, the reader can switch to another." The second approach organizes various nianfo methods into a graded curriculum, beginning with the easiest method.

=== List of methods ===
East Asian Buddhism contains many methods and techniques for the practice of nianfo. They are taught by monastics and lay teachers and are found in classic text and popular publications like Zhèng Wéiān's Forty-Eight Ways to Nianfo (Ch.: Niànfó sìshíbā fǎ, which has been translated into English under the title Taming the Monkey Mind). As early as Kuiji's (632–682) Commentary on the Amitāyus Sūtra (阿彌陀經通贊疏; T.1758), three types of recitation were taught: mental recitation of nianfo, light verbal nianfo only heard by oneself, and loud verbal nianfo. Tiānrú Wéizé's (1286?–1354) Questions about Pure Land (T.1972) meanwhile provides two main categories: visualization (觀想), and recollection and invocation (意念).

Nianfo variations and techniques include the following:

- Using a mala or rosary and moving one bead for each chant of "Amitabha". One can decide ahead of time to commit to a certain number of recitations per day and track these with the mala. This can help in eliminating laziness. Patriarchs like Ouyi aimed at 30 to 100 thousand repetitions a day. An alternative method is to move one bead for a certain number of recitations, such as five or ten rapid recitations.
- Chanting with a loud voice, to overcome sleepiness or torpor.
- Quiet recitation for when one is tired or anxious.
- "Reflecting the name" in which one carefully listens to the sounds as one recites the nianfo. This is influenced by the Shurangama sutra's teaching for meditating on the hearing faculty.
- "Vajra recitation" (Ch.: jin'gang chifa) "in which one moves the lips without emitting any sound", useful for practicing in public.
- Silent recitation without moving the lips at all.
- Linked with the breath, one mentally recites nianfo with each in breath and out breath. One may also visualize the breath as light going in and out of one's nose.
- "Continuously linked recitation" in which one "recites softly, each word following the one immediately before, each phrase closely following the previous phrase".
- Reciting nianfo in various postures, such as while walking, while circumambulating a Buddha statue, or while standing or lying down.
- Practicing nianfo while looking at a Buddha image.
- Bowing recitation, in which one bows to the Buddha and recites, either one recitation per vow, or constant recitation as we bow again and again. According to Thích Thiện Tâm "its benefits are very great, because the practitioner engages in recitation with his body, speech and mind."
- Reciting nianfo while in the middle of daily activities.
- The Chan influenced "Pure Land kōan" method in which one recites nianfo and pauses to ask "Who is it that performs nianfo?".
- "Holding the name in the midst of light" (Ch.: guangzhong chiming) in which "one hears the sound of one's own recitation and visualizes the sound revolving in the space of the heart. The sound turns into light, and one places oneself in the light and abides in it for a time." A similar method is taught by Thích Thiện Tâm who writes that one may recite nianfo while imagining oneself "seated in the midst of a huge, brilliant zone of light". Similarly, the first visualization of the Amitayus Contemplation Sutra is to visualize a golden shining setting sun.
- "Lotus blossom method" in which one visualizes a shining lotus blossom while reciting the name.
- Patriarch Fazhao's "five stage nianfo" (五會念佛) method in which one chants nianfo melodically in five different tempos, beginning at a slow tempo and ending in a rapid tempo.
- Utau nembutsu (singing nenbutsu) and odori nembutsu (dancing nembutsu), two popular methods from Japan and popularized by itinerant hijiris like Ippen.
- Patriarch Yinguang's "ten recitation method" in which one recites the name of Amitabha ten times and then start over again at one. One should not count the recitations, but merely remain aware and focused so one knows when number ten has been reached. This practice is also taught as something that can be applied throughout the day. One program mentioned by Shi Wuling is to chant one ten count round of this method "upon waking up, before and after breakfast, before work, before and after lunch, before and after dinner, and before retiring."
- Enlightened recitation, in which one "turns the light around" towards our true nature as one recites the nianfo. This is considered to be for those of highest capacity.
- Esoteric nembutsu (J: himitsu nenbutsu) practices, which are particularly taught in Japanese esoteric Buddhism (Mikkyō) and draw on the teachings of figures like Kakuban.

=== Group nianfo ===
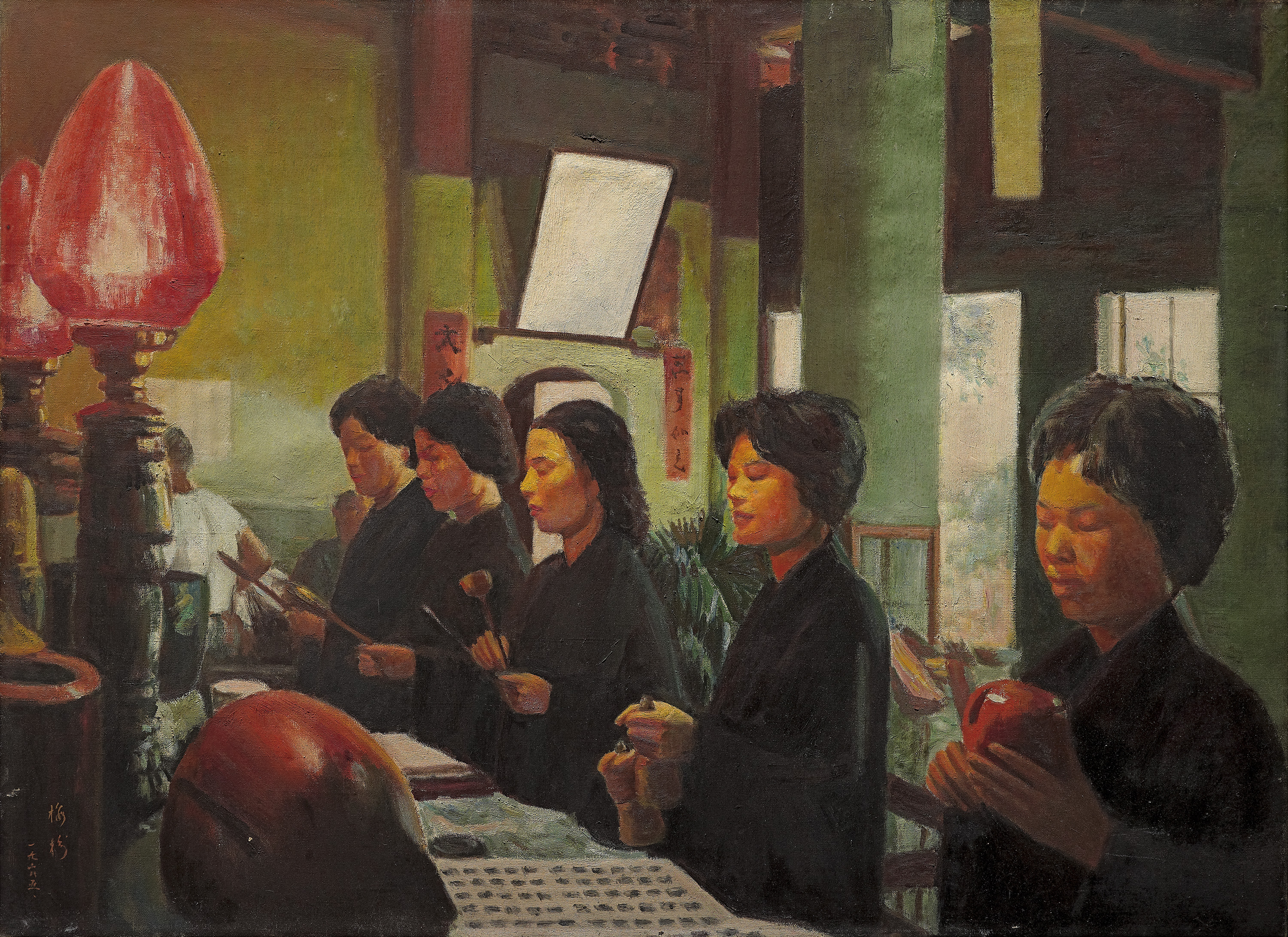
A painting by Li Mei-shu depicting a chanting session

Nianfo practice can be done alone or in a group. Individuals may track their recitations using a mala, sometimes seeking to achieve a specific number of recitations per day. Group chanting sessions may be accompanied by a wooden fish or other percussion instruments. Special halls are often set aside for chanting, called nianfo halls. Chinese temples and nianfo halls will often hold nianfo retreats attended by monastic and lay. They may last for several days and may include chanting, walking nianfo, and quiet sitting nianfo meditation.

=== Graded nianfo paths ===
One of the earliest of these graded path models is found in Chengguan's commentary on the Gandavyuha Sutra's passage on twenty one kinds of nianfo. This commentary contains the following schema of nianfo practice (or ascending levels of spiritual growth in relation to nianfo):

1. Nianfo focused on an external Buddha and an external Pure land
2. Mind-only nianfo in which one is aware that mind is Buddha
3. The cessation of both the mind and the object of visualization in emptiness
4. The non-obstruction of mind and its object based on mutual interpenetration and the interfusion of principle (li) and phenomena (shih)
5. The inexhaustible identity of oneself with all things

This method was further modified by Guifeng Zongmi, a Huayan and Chan master who also wrote on nianfo practice. He taught a path schema of four types of nianfo which was adopted by later Pure Land authors like Yunqi Zhuhong (1535–1615) and Zhiyu (1924–2000). Zongmi's four types of nianfo are:

- "Contemplation of the name" (稱名念), which is based on The Perfection of Wisdom Sutra preached by Mañjuśrī (T.232) and involves selecting a Buddha, facing their direction, and focusing on their name until one has a vision of all buddhas (past, present, and future). As noted by Jones, while later Chinese Pure Land thinkers interpreted this practice as oral recitation, it seems that for Zongmi this entailed mentally "holding" (稱名) the sound of the name. Yunqi Zhuhong taught "holding the name" in various ways including: audible recitation of the name (明持), silent contemplation of the name (mòchí 默持), or contemplation accompanied by barely audible whispering of the name (半明半默持).
- "Contemplating an image" (觀像念), which is based on the Dà bǎojī jīng (大寶積經, Great Jewel Collection Sutra, T.310) which according to Jones "says that in contemplating an image of a buddha, one realizes the non-duality of the image with the buddha."
- "Contemplating the visualization" (觀想念), "means to contemplate the major and minor marks of a buddha's body without the aid of a physical image. One may select one feature upon which to focus or contemplate them all simultaneously." The sources for this nianfo practice are the Sutra on the samadhi-ocean of the contemplation of the Buddha (T.643) and Sutra on the samadhi of seated meditation (T.614).
- "Contemplating the true mark" (實相念), "one contemplates the buddha's dharma body, which is also the contemplation of one's own true self and the true nature of all phenomena. This is also based on The Perfection of Wisdom Sutra Preached by Mañjuśrī, which describes the true nature of the buddha as "unproduced and unextinguished, neither going nor coming, without name and without feature. That alone is called 'buddha'."

This schema may have been presented as a progressive path of practice, from easiest to most difficult and profound.

While Zongmi held that the fourth method of nianfo was the most profound, the later Pure Land patriarch Yunqi Zhuhong reversed this progression in his Commentary and Notes on the Amitābha Sūtra (Ch.: Āmítuó jīng shūchǎo 阿彌陀經疏鈔 CBETA X.424), arguing that "contemplation of the name" was actually the highest practice since it consists of the unity of principle and phenomena. Modern Chinese Pure Land masters like Zhiyu (c. 1924–2000, cf. Lotuses at the Pond's Edge, Ch: Chipan lian chao) have continued to make use of Zhuhong's schema.

Zhuhong also taught that there were two main mental attitudes that can be applied to practicing nianfo:

- "Phenomenal holding of the name" (shìchí 事持), which entails concentrating on the individual syllables of the name. This leads to a calm and focused mind, and thus to samadhi and so it is mainly a "calming" (zhǐ 止, samatha) practice.
- "Noumenal holding of the name" (lǐchí 理持), which shifts the attention to the mind that is holding the name and eventually realizes that the non-duality of oneself and Amitabha. This is a contemplation (guān 觀) practice aimed at wisdom.

Zongmi's classic schema is also taught by the modern Vietnamese Pure Land master Thích Thiện Tâm in his Buddhism of Wisdom & Faith (1994, pp. 116–119).

Like Zhuhong, Thiện Tâm emphasizes the superiority of oral recitation, writing that only oral recitation "embraces people of all capacities, leads to swift results and is easy enough for anyone to practice." Furthermore, when practiced well, Thích Thiện Tâm states this practice will lead us to see Amitabha and the Pure land in this life and even awaken us to the Original Mind.

=== Genshin's schema of practices ===
The Japanese Tendai monk Genshin devotes a chapter on nianfo practice in his influential Ōjōyōshū (Essentials for Birth in the Pure Land). Genshin outlines three main categories of nienfo (Jp: nenbutsu) practice:

1. Contemplation of the individual marks – This involves visualizing all 32 marks of a great man (mahāpuruṣa lakṣaṇa) along with some extra secondary marks, beginning with the ushnisha at the top of the Buddha's head. This is repeated in forward and reverse order sixteen times until one is able to visualize Amitabha's form perfectly.
2. Contemplation of the comprehensive mark – this involves visualizing Amitabha as a gigantic shining gold being sitting on a huge lotus dais, or visualizing him as encompassing all three buddha-bodies (trikaya). Genshin considered this the most profound method.
3. Mixed and abbreviated contemplations – these are easier and simpler methods for those who cannot do the others. They include visualizing the curled white tuft of hair between Amitabha's eyebrows radiating salvific light, as well as simple recitation of the nenbutsu while imagining oneself taking refuge in Amitabha and being taken to the Pure Land.

=== Mental attitude ===
An important element of nianfo practice in East Asian Buddhism is the question of what kind of mental attitude is needed (if any) when reciting the name of the Buddha (or meditating on him). The Pure land sutras seem to indicate that faith (śraddhā) is needed for birth in the Pure land. The sūtras also mention a place outside the Pure Land called the "City of Doubt" (Ch.: yicheng), where those who lack faith but still recite the name are reborn. In its discussion of mindfulness of the Buddha and the 18th vow of Amitabha, the Amitayus sutra mentions three aspects of mind: "a sincere mind" (至心), "serene faith" (信楽), and "the desire to be reborn" (欲生).

As such, the Pure Land masters like Shandao argued that reciting the nianfo with a faithful mind was important. Shandao writes that the ideal attitude is the Three Minds (三心), which are also outlined in the Amitayus Contemplation Sutra as follows: "first, a sincere mind; second, a deep mind; and third, a mind that seeks birth there [the Pure Land] by transferring one's merit." Shandao comments on this passage by saying that the "sincere mind" is based on worshiping, praising, glorifying and contemplating the Buddha, while the "deep mind" is true faith in Amitabha and his pure land without any doubt. Finally, the third mind is the intention to transfer all of one's meritorious roots towards birth in the pure land. True faith was also emphasized by Japanese authors like Shinran, who saw complete entrustment (Jp: shinjin) as the one central and essential element of nianfo practice. Nianfo will not work without it. Furthermore, for Shinran, true faith is a gift of grace by Amitabha, it cannot be generated by oneself.

Japanese authors like Shinran also argued that nianfo works only due to the "other-power" of Amitabha, and one's own "self-power" is futile and useless. As such, making effort on our part is counterproductive, one merely has to entrust oneself in Amitabha completely. The Chinese tradition on the other hand holds that self-power and other-power work together through a "sympathetic resonance" (gǎnyìng). As such, one should make skillful effort to practice diligently.

Bodhicitta (the mind which aims at awakening for the benefit of all beings) is also another important attitude which is mentioned by Indian and Asian sources on nianfo. Bodhicitta is mentioned in Pure land scriptures like the Amitayus Sutra. Figures like Tanluan, Wonhyo and Jixing Chewu also stress the importance of bodhicitta for the successful practice of nianfo. Jixing Chewu goes as far as saying that without the bodhicitta motivation, the "sympathetic resonance" (gǎnyìng) which tunes one's mind to the Buddha's power will not be activated. Similarly, Vietnamese master Thích Thiện Tâm writes that developing bodhicitta is a "crucial step" for those who practice nianfo. He also quotes the Avatamsaka sutra which states: "to neglect bodhicitta when practicing good deeds is the action of demons". A related element is the taking of vows, particularly the vow to be reborn in the Pure Land. Figures like Ouyi Zhixu and Thích Thiện Tâm argue that vows is one of the essential elements of nianfo practice, along with faith and practice itself. According to Ouyi Zhixu, faith and vows are necessary for birth in the Pure Land (without them one might fail to attain rebirth there). Meanwhile, the depth of one's practice will determine the stage of rebirth (i.e. which of the nine lotus grades one will attain) in the Pure Land.

Some figures like Ippen disagreed with the view that any specific mental attitude was needed for rebirth in the Pure Land however. They argued that the power of the Buddha worked no matter what one's mental attitude was since the presence of Amitabha's name in one's mind purified the mind by itself, like the mythical wish fulfilling mani jewel.

== Phrases used in recitation ==
=== Sanskrit ===
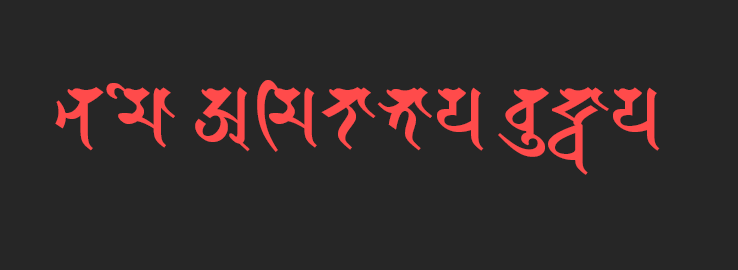
Namo Amitābhāya Buddhāya in the Siddhaṃ script

The following phrase appears in the opening of the extant Sanskrit Infinite Life Sutra, as well as the later composition, the Contemplation Sutra (only extant in Chinese):

namo'mitābhāya buddhāya (IPA: [n̪ɐmoːɐmɪt̪ɑːbʱɑːjɐbud̪̚.d̪ʱɑːjɐ] )

The apostrophe and omission of the first "A" in "Amitābha" comes from normal Sanskrit sandhi sound change rule, and implies that the initial A in Amitabha is omitted due to the previous vowel o. A rendering without sandhi might be:

Namo Amitābhāya Buddhāya

A literal English translation would be "Bow to Amitābha Buddha" or "Homage to Amitābha Buddha".

Several scholars have also argued that the Pure Land sutras might have originally been written in Gandhari. Jan Nattier gives the possible Gandhari name for Amitābha as Amidā'a. Thus, a possible Gandhari Prakrit reconstruction of the phrase is:

Namo Amidā'a Budha

=== Nianfo in East Asia ===
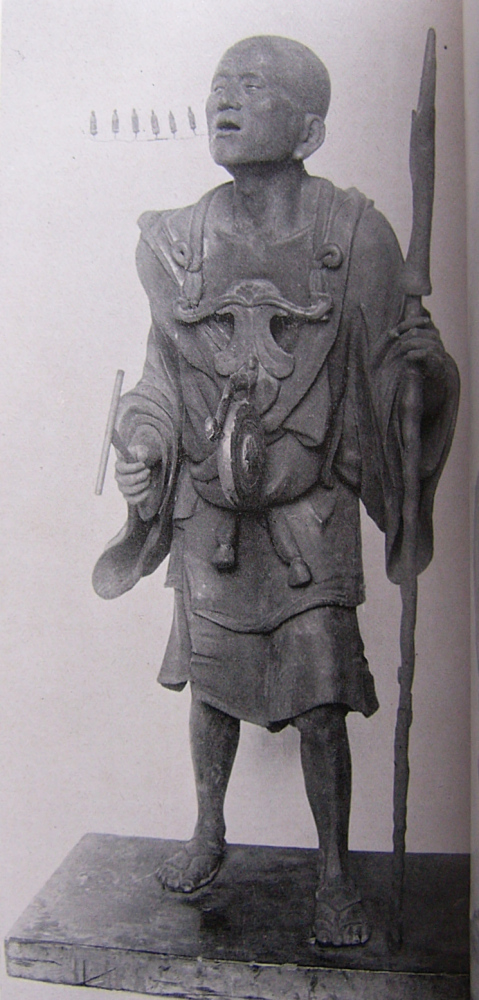
Japanese itinerant monk Kūya reciting the nembutsu, each of the Chinese characters represented by a small figure of Amida emerging from his mouth

As the practice of nianfo spread from India to various other regions, the original pronunciation changed to fit various local languages.

Language	As written	Romanization	IPA
Sanskrit	नमोऽमिताभाय बुद्धाय नमोऽमितयुसे बुद्धाय	Namo'mitābhāya Buddhāya	[n̪ɐmoːɐmɪt̪ɑːbʱɑːjɐbud̪̚.d̪ʱɑːjɐ] [n̪ɐmoːɐmɪt̪ɑːjʊʂeːbud̪̚.d̪ʱɑːjɐ]
Chinese	Traditional: 南無阿彌陀佛; Simplified: 南无阿弥陀佛	Mandarin: Nāmó āmítuófó Cantonese: naa1 mo4 o1 mei4 to4 fat6 Taiwanese: lâm-bû o-bí-tô-hu̍t	[nä˥˥ mu̯ɔ˧˥ ˀɤ˥˥ mi˧˥ tʰu̯ɔ˧˥ fu̯ɔ˧˥] [naː˥˥ mɔː˨˩ ɔː˥˥ mei̯˨˩ tʰɔː˨˩ fɐt̚˨]
Japanese	Kanji: 南無阿弥陀仏	Namu Amida Butsu (Note: Colloquial alterations, reductions and contractions include namu Amida Bu, namu Amida, namo Amida Butsu, namo Amida, nanmamida Butsu, nanmamida Bu, nanmamida, nanmamidā, namamida Butsu, namamida Bu, namamida, nanmaida Butsu, nanmaida Bu, nanmaida, namaida, namōda, onamamedan Butsu.)	[nà̠mɯ̟́ᵝ á̠mʲídá̠bɯ̟̀ᵝt͡sɨ̀ᵝ]
Korean	Hanja: 南無阿彌陀佛; Hangul: 나무아미타불	Namu Amita Bul	[na̠mua̠mitʰa̠buɭ]
Vietnamese	Chữ Hán: 南無阿彌陀佛; Quốc ngữ: Nam mô A-di-đà Phật	Nam mô A-di-đà Phật	[naːm˧˧ mo˧˧ ʔaː˧˧ zi˧˧ ʔɗaː˨˩ fət̚˧˨ʔ]

In China, the practice of nianfo was codified with the establishment of the separate Pure Land school of Buddhism. The most common form of this is the six syllable nianfo; some shorten it into Ēmítuófó/Āmítuófó. In the Japanese Jodo Shinshu sect, it is often shortened to na man da bu.

=== Variations and alternate names ===
==== Alternate Sanskrit phrases ====
In an East Asian Buddhist context the term nianfo or nembutsu generally refers to the recitation of Amitabha Buddha's name. Technically speaking however, the term literally means "Buddha Recollection" and hence can apply to the recitation of any Buddha's name, such as reciting "Namo Shakyamuni Buddha" or "Namo Mahavairocana Buddha" etc. The Lotus Sutra and other texts mention the generic: namo buddhāya. In these cases, the term nianfo is often prefigured by the name of that Buddha. For example, the Japanese term Shaka Nembutsu refers to the recitation of Namo Shakyamuni Buddha. Some Mahayana sutras, like the Ajitasena sutra and the Medicine Guru Sutra, indicate that "hearing" and "preserving" the name of other Buddhas like Shakyamuni and Medicine Guru, will also have the same effect as nianfo on the name of Amitabha (i.e. rebirth in Sukhavati). Furthermore, nianfo can also refer to devotional phrases used for bodhisattvas as well, such as: Namo'valokiteśvarāya, Namo Guanshiyin Pusa, Namo Mañjuśriye, etc.

While almost unknown, and unused outside of the original Sanskrit, Indic texts provide a recitation of Amitābha's alternate aspect of Amitāyus as:

Namo'mitāyuṣe buddhāya (sans sandhi: Namo Amitāyuṣe Buddhāya)

A literal translation of this version would be "Namo Buddha of Infinite Life". Other translations may also be: "I pay homage to the Enlightened One immeasurable" or "I turn to rely on the Enlightened One immeasurable".

There are also other names of Amida Buddha, such as Aparimitāyus (Unlimited Life), Aparimitāyurjñāna (Unlimited Life and Wisdom), Vajra-āyuṣa (Vajra Life), Dundubhisvararāja, Amṛtadundubhisvararāja (King of the Drum of Immortality) and Aparimitāyurjñānasuviniścitatejorāja (The Blazing King Who Is Completely Certain of Immeasurable Longevity and Wisdom) which are often equated or identified with Amitābha – Amitāyus and which are connected with rebirth in Sukhavati in their respective sutras.

Furthermore, the Longer Sukhāvatīvyūha Sūtra contains twelve or more epithets of Amitābha Buddha. Vasubandhu's Treatise on Birth in the Pure Land (Wang-sheng-lun) references these "lights of Amitābha". Their recitation was also taught by Chinese Pure Land figures like Shandao. There are various sets of these names. The names in the Sanskrit edition of the Amitayus sutra are:

1. Tathāgato 'mitābha – The Tathāgata Immeasurable Light
2. Amitaprabha – Immeasurable Radiance
3. Amitaprabhāso – Unbounded Radiance
4. Asamāptaprabha – Unending Radiance
5. Asaṃgataprabha – Inconceivable Radiance
6. Prabhāśikhotsṛṣṭaprabha – [The one with a] splendorous crest which emits radiance
7. Sādivyamaṇiprabha – [The one with] Divine Jewel Splendor
8. Apratihataraśmirāgaprabha – [The one with] light rays that are unobstructed and radiant
9. Rājanīyaprabha – King Radiance
10. Premaṇīyaprabha – Lovable Radiance
11. Pramodanīyaprabha – Joyful Radiance
12. Saṃgamanīyaprabha – Harmonious Radiance
13. Upoṣaṇīyaprabha – Worshipful Radiance
14. Nibandhanīyaprabha – Unbreakable Radiance
15. Ativīryaprabha – Supremely vigorous radiance
16. Atulyaprabha – Incomparable Radiance
17. Abhibhūyanarendrāmūnnayendraprabha – Surpassing the splendor of kings and gods
18. Śrāntasaṃcayendusūryajihmīkaraṇaprabha – Surpassing the splendor of the moon and stars

==== Esoteric phrases ====
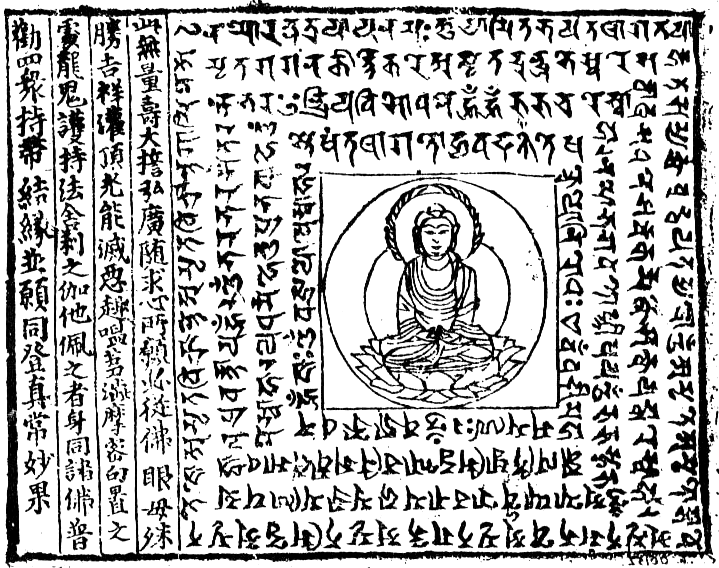
Image of an engraving of the Pure Land Rebirth Dharani discovered at the Mogao Caves, Dunhuang

In Esoteric Buddhist traditions, there are various mantras associated with Amitabha and their recitation would be considered a type of Buddha mindfulness or nianfo. Indian esoteric sources, including Buddhist tantras and dharani collections like Atikūṭa's (阿地瞿多, mid-seventh century) Dhāraṇīsaṃgraha (T. 901) contain numerous esoteric phrases, dhāraṇīs, spells, and mudras focused on Amitabha and his Pure Land.

Shingon Buddhism makes use of the following mantra of Amitabha which is found in The Nine Grades of Rebirth Amita Samādhi Dhāraṇī Sūtra (九品往生阿彌陀三摩地集陀羅尼經, Taisho no. 933):

oṃ amṛta teje hara hūṃ

This mantra was promoted by Shingon writers on the nembutsu, like Kakuban. In Tibetan Buddhism, the most popular mantra is:

oṃ amideva hrīḥ

Another mantra which is found in various Indian sources including the Sarvadurgatipariśodhanatantra is:

oṁ puṇye puṇye mahāpuṇye aparimitāyuḥ-puṇya-jñāna-saṃbharopacite svāhā

There are various dharanis which are associated with Amitabha and nianfo practice. The Amitabha Pure Land Rebirth Dharani (往生淨土神咒) is perhaps the most popular Amitabha dharani. It is seen as having similar benefits to nianfo, including rebirth in Sukhavati, purification of karma and visions of Amitabha. One version of this dharani is:

namo amitābhāya tathāgatāya tadyathā amṛtadbhave amṛtasaṃbhave amṛtavikrānte amṛtavikrānta gāmine gagana kīrtakare svāhā

Another popular dharani associated with Amitabha is the Aparamitāyus Dhāraṇī (無量壽經, Wú Liàng Shòu Jīng; T. 370, with alternate versions at T. 936, and T. 937). This dharani was widely translated and used in Mahayana esoteric circles as well as in Pure Land Buddhism. It is also found in the Tibetan Canon in multiple versions (Tohoku no. 674, 673, 675) under various names like Āryāparimitāyurjñānanāmamahāyānasūtra. These two dharanis are part of the Ten Small Mantras, an important set of mantras and dharanis in Chinese Buddhism which is often part of morning services at temples.

==== East Asian Nianfo variants ====
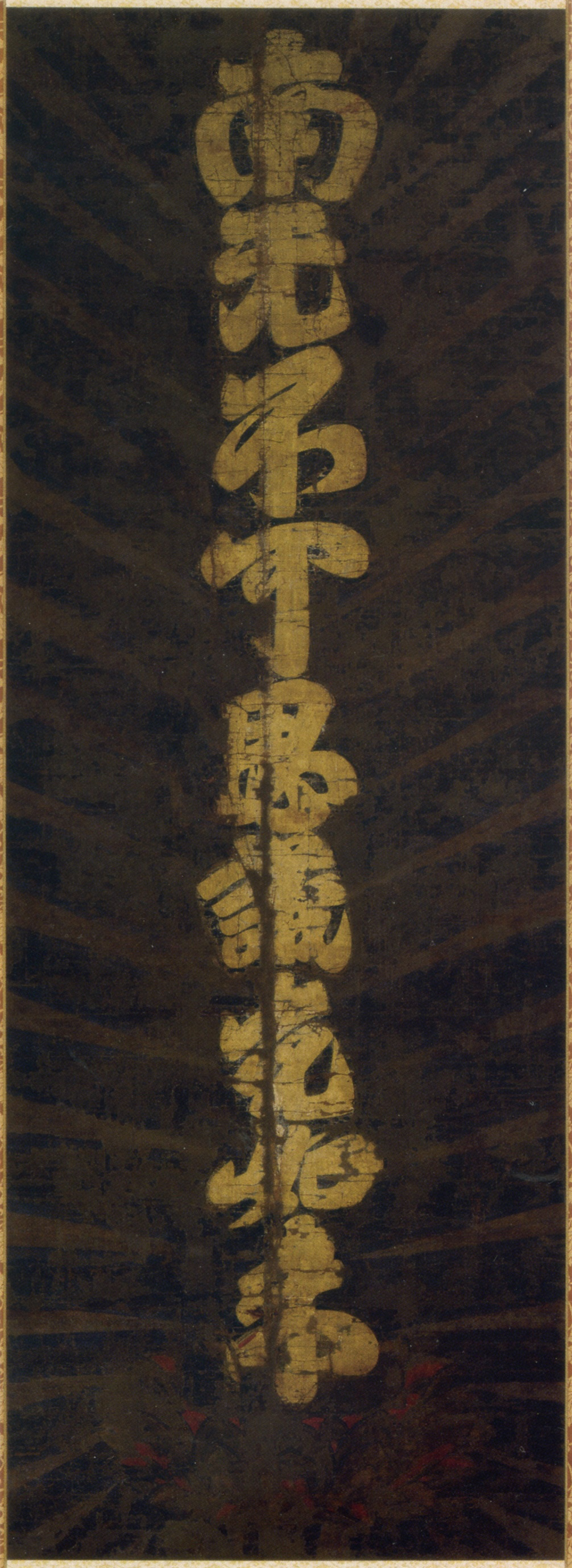
Kujimyōgō, Nyoi-ji Temple

According to the Jikaku daishiden 慈覚大師伝, when the Tendai master Ennin was passing away ,he recited the following nenbutsu:

Kimyō chorai Mida shugaku 帰命頂礼弥陀修学 (I take refuge in and venerate Amida who possesses the knowledge of all modes of existence)

In the Jodo Shinshu tradition in Japan, variant forms of the nianfo have been used since its inception. The founder, Shinran, used a nine-character Kujimyōgō (九字名号) in the Shoshinge and the Sanamidabutsuge (讃阿弥陀佛偈) hymns:

南無不可思議光如来

Na mu fu ka shi gi kō nyo rai
"I take refuge in Inconceivable Light Tathagata!"

Namo Acintya-prabha Tathagata

Further, the "restorer" of Jodo Shinshu, Rennyo, frequently inscribed the nianfo for followers using a 10-character Jūjimyōgō (十字名号):

帰命尽十方無碍光如来
Ki myō jin jip-pō mu ge kō nyo rai

"I take refuge in the Tathagata of Unobstructed Light Suffusing the Ten Directions".

The latter was originally popularized by Shinran's descendant (and Rennyo's ancestor), Kakunyo, but its use was greatly expanded by Rennyo.

In the Shingon school, another alternative way of saying the nembutsu was to use just the simple name of A-MI-TA, often written in the Siddham script. This three syllable invokation was subjected to extensive esoteric interpretation by various Shingon Pure Land masters like Dōhan and Kakuban. Dōhan also relies on the longer NAMO-A-MI-TA-BU recitation.

== See also ==
- Amitabha Pure Land Rebirth Dharani
- Namu Myōhō Renge Kyō
- Mantra of Light
- Om mani padme hum
- Hesychasm

== Bibliography ==
- Baskind, James (2008). The Nianfo in Obaku Zen: A Look at the Teachings of the Three Founding Masters, Japanese Religions 33 (1–2),19–34
- Buswell, Robert Jr; Lopez, Donald S. Jr., eds. (2013). Princeton Dictionary of Buddhism. Princeton, NJ: Princeton University Press. ISBN 9780691157863.
- Grumbach, Lisa (2005). "Nenbutsu and Meditation: Problems with the Categories of Contemplation, Devotion, Meditation, and Faith", Pacific World, Third Series, 7, 91–105.
- Inagaki Hisao, trans., Stewart, Harold (2003). The Three Pure Land Sutras, 2nd ed., Berkeley, Numata Center for Buddhist Translation and Research. ISBN 1-886439-18-4
- Jones, Charles B. (2001). Toward a Typology of Nien-fo: A Study in Methods of Buddha-Invocation in Chinese Pure Land Buddhism, Pacific World, Third Series, 3, 219–239.
- Jones, Charles B. (2019). Chinese Pure Land Buddhism, Understanding a Tradition of Practice. University of Hawai'i Press / Honolulu.
- Jones, Charles B. (2021). Pure Land: History, Tradition, and Practice. Shambhala Publications.
- Keenan, John P. (1989). Nien-Fo (Buddha-Anusmrti): The Shifting Structure of Remembrance, Pacific World, New Series 5, 40–52
- Kuo, Li-Ying (1995), La récitation des noms de "buddha" en Chine et au Japon. T'oung Pao, Second Series 81 (4/5), 230–268
- Payne, Richard K. (2005). "Seeing Buddhas, Hearing Buddhas: Cognitive Significance of Nenbutsu as Visualization and as Recitation", Pacific World, Third Series, 7, 110–141
- Thích, Thiện Tâm (1994). Buddhism of Wisdom & Faith: Pure Land Principles and Practice. Sutra Translation Committee of the United States.
- Thích, Tịnh Lạc (2000). Taming the Monkey Mind: A Guide to Pure Land Practice by the Buddhist Scholar Cheng Wei-an Translation with Commentary by Dharma Master Suddhisukha.. Sutra Translation Committee of the U. S. and Canada.
- Ueda, Kazutoshi; Matsui, Kanji (10 October 1940) [8 October 1915]. 大日本國語辭典 (in Japanese). Vol. 4 (revised ed.). Kanda, Tokyo: Fuzambo.
