= Peng Shaosheng =

Qing dynasty Buddhist scholar

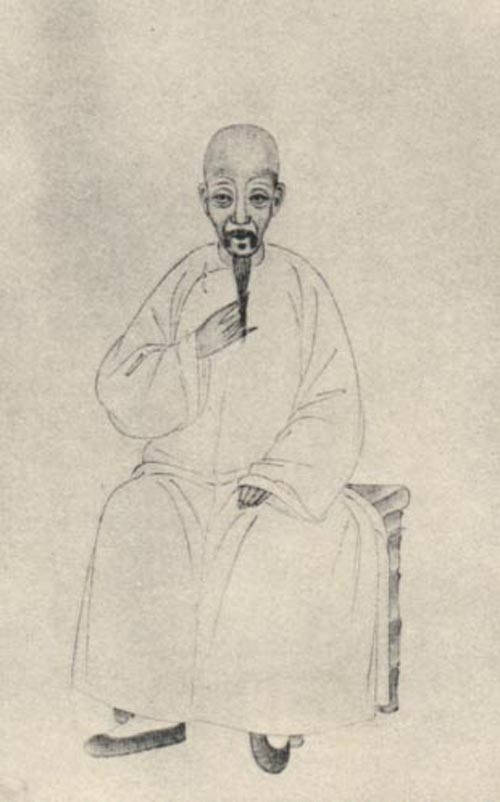
Chinese illustration of Peng Shaosheng

Peng Shaosheng (彭紹升, 1740–1796) was a lay Buddhist scholar-practitioner and literatus during the Qing dynasty. He was also known by the sobriquets Erlin Jushi (二林居士) and Zhiguizi (知歸子, "master who knows his true home"), as well as the Buddhist Dharma name Jiqing (際清). Peng is known for his synthesis of Pure Land and Huayan Buddhism as well as for his biographical collections of the lives of eminent laymen, laywomen and Pure Land sages.

== Life ==
Peng was native of Changzhou (Jiangsu) and came from an elite Chinese family of top imperial Confucian scholars many of whom had been government officials. Peng passed the provincial examination when he was eighteen and at twenty-two, he ranked eighteenth in the palace examination, receiving the degree of jinshi (進士). Peng initially studied the Chinese classics, and also Neo-Confucianism, especially the School of Mind (xinxue 心学) of Wang Yangming and Lu Xiangshan. He also gave up a government career in order to study privately, and even practiced Daoism for three years.

After turning to Buddhism, studying Hanshan Deqing and the Avatamsaka Sutra, he chose to focus on the Pure Land path practice of nianfo. Peng became a vegetarian at twenty nine and also established a practice center for the practice of nianfo. At the age of thirty-four, he also studied under the Chan Master Xueding (聞學實定禪師) and received Bodhisattva precepts, taking the Dharma name Jiqing. Peng died at the age of fifty-seven.

Peng Shaosheng was also a practitioner of spirit writing (or "planchette writing") and compiled spirit writing texts and seance transcripts.

== Thought ==
=== On the three teachings ===
Peng Shaosheng retained his respect for Confucianism throughout his life, always advocating for the harmony between Confucianism and Buddhism (as well as Daoism). According to Peng, the ultimate meaning of the three teachings (Confucianism, Daoism and Buddhism) are the same, as they all point to the same nature. As such, the adherents of the three teachings who argued with each other did so "because of their failure to realize that the truth of human nature is constant within us, that in fundamental tenets there are no differences to be found. They looked only at the branches, picked the leaves: how could they realize the whole?".

Peng participated in various written debates with Confucian literati like Dai Zhen (1724–1777) and Yuan Mei (1716–1797) in order to defend Buddhism against their critiques. In his defense of Buddhism, Peng insists that the Buddhist goal could be found within lay life, as a family member and countryman. He also argued that Buddhist practices actually help people to better fulfill their social duties (and as such, it also contributes to the goal of Confucianism). Because of this, he argued both teachings were in harmony. As part of his project to establish this harmony, Peng included stories in his biographies of Buddhist laypersons who exemplified Confucian virtues.

=== Pure Land and Huayan ===
Peng's faith in the Pure Land was driven by his reading of the Avatamsaka sutra, a sutra which he saw as being oriented towards Pure Land practice. Peng understood the Pure Land method from a Huayan point of view and wrote works like Treatise on the Huayan-Nianfo-Samadhi to explain this Huayan-Pure-Land synthesis.

According to Peng, the universal Buddha Vairocana (of the Avatamsaka sutra) and the Buddha Amitabha are actually the same Buddha and thus Amitabha's pure land of Sukhavati is the same as Vairocana Buddha's Lotus Treasury World. As such, Peng held that the numerous methods taught in the Avatamsaka (especially the practice of the ten vows of Samantabhadra) all ultimately led to the goal of rebirth in the same pure land. Furthermore, Peng saw the Huayan principle of the interpenetration of principle and phenomena as indicating that these pure lands were mutually interfused and non-dual with all worlds in the universe (and likewise, all Buddhas were also interfused in this way). because of this, reciting the Buddha Amitabha's name could lead to a vision of all Buddhas and to the realization of the Dharma found in the Avatamsaka sutra. Peng also held that reciting the Avatamsaka sutra would lead to birth in the highest level of the Pure land.

According to Peng, the Avatamsaka sutra teaches two fundamental forms of buddha recitation (nianfo): universal Nianfo (contemplation of many or of all the Buddhas in the universe) and exclusive nianfo (on one single Buddha). Peng held that ultimately both forms form a single unity. Peng also arranges nianfo practice into five forms:

- The recollection of the Buddha's dharma-body (dharmakaya), the ultimate truth, Thusness, which is inherent in the nature of all beings. This refers to the Buddha as one's own self-nature.
- The recollection of the Buddha's virtues which leads to the realization of the boundless appearance of the Buddhas.
- The recollection of the Buddha's name, which is the most convenient skillful means and leads to perceiving all the Buddhas.
- The recollection of Vairocana Buddha, which can lead to the realization of the "one true Dharmadhatu" which comprises everything in the universe and is also the unity of all Buddhas and lands.
- The recollection of Amitabha which accomplishes the ten vows of Samantabhadra and is ultimately not different from the recollection of Vairocana.

=== Ethics ===
Peng Shaosheng understood the Pure Land path as working through the underlying principle of "sympathetic resonance" or "stimulus and response" (ganying). This principle holds that the attainment of the pure land works through the interaction of the person to be saved and the Buddha. Due to this, Peng holds that someone could fail to be reborn in the pure land if their moral failings impede their faith and devotion. Because of this, he saw the development of compassion and moral cultivation (through keeping Buddhist precepts), as well as understanding Buddhist teachings, as crucial to the Pure Land Buddhist path. According to Peng, those who did not maintain Buddhist ethics or understand Buddhist teachings might instead be reborn in the border land to the pure land, the "land of the lax and arrogant" (Xie man guo 懈慢國), a place which is beyond the six realms and from which one can transition to the pure land. Peng also encouraged ethical behavior through the doctrine of the nine grades of rebirth in the pure land. According to his view, good ethical behavior could lead to birth in a higher grade of rebirth in the pure land (leading to a faster attainment of Buddhahood).

Peng also held that reciting the name of the Buddha allowed one to reach moral perfection in this life:

When one meditates/recites the name of Amitābha Buddha for one moment, that moment one becomes the Buddha; if one meditates/recites the name of the Buddha at every moment, one becomes the Buddha at every moment. If one’s mind is pure, and the land is pure.

Peng tied his Buddhist view of moral perfection, enlightenment and faith (which he saw as identical) with Confucian concepts like Wang's view of the "innate knowledge of the good" (liangzhi 良知) and the Confucian idea of zhishan (the ultimate good). As such, he held that Confucian and Buddhist ethics were fundamentally the same and he also wrote “[Chanting] Amituofo is the extension of one’s innate knowledge of the good”.

Peng Shaosheng's thought was influential on later figures. According to Hongyu Wu, "Late Qing and early Republican reformers such as Gong Zizhen 龔自珍 (1792-1841), Wei Yuan 魏源 (1794-1857), Yang Wenhui 楊文會 (1837-1911), and Tan Sitong 譚嗣同 (1865-1898) were all indebted to his Buddhist thought and practice."

== Works ==
Peng Shaosheng's works include:

- Commentary on the Awakening of Faith in the Mahayana (無量壽經起信論) in three volumes,
- A Treatise on the Essentials of the Visualization of the Infinite Life Sutra (觀無量壽佛經約論) in one volume,
- A Treatise on the Essentials of the Amitabha Sutra (阿彌陀經約論) in one volume,
- A Treatise on Resolving Doubts in the One Vehicle (一乘決疑論) in one volume,
- A Treatise on the Samadhi of Mindfulness of the Buddha in the Flower Garland Sutra (華嚴經念佛三昧論) in one volume,
- Biographies of Laypeople (居士傳) in fifty-six volumes,
- Biographies of Virtuous Women (善女人傳) in two volumes,
- Collected Works of Erlin Jushi (二林居集) in twenty-four volumes,
- Collected Works of Yi Xing (一行居集) in eight volumes,
- Harmonious Poems of Erlin (二林唱和詩),
- Collected Poems of Observing the River (觀河集),
- Collected Poems of Measuring the Sea (測海集), each in one volume,
- Biography of Prince Yixiang, the Gracious and Wise (和碩怡賢親王允祥傳).
- Record of Holy Beings of the Pure Land (淨土聖賢錄) in nine volumes, compiled by Peng, his nephew Peng Xisu and others.

Additionally, Peng Shaosheng was involved in the publication and compilation of the Three Pure Land Sutras.
