= Shi Yinguang =

Qing dynasty Chinese Buddhist monk and Thirteenth Chinese Pure Land Patriarch

Grand Master (大師) Yinguang
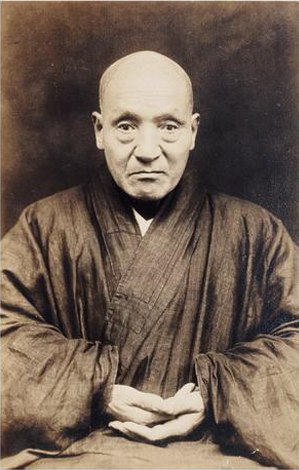
- A photograph of Yinguang

Personal life
- Born: 11 January 1862 Shanxi province, Qing empire
- Died: 2 December 1940 (aged 78) Suzhou, Jiangsu province, China

Religious life
- Religion: Buddhism
- Lineage: Chinese Pure Land

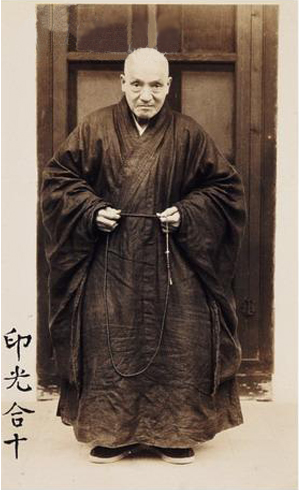
Annotated photo of Yinguang

Shi Yinguang (Chinese: 釋印光; pinyin: Shì Yìnguāng; 11 January 1862 – 2 December 1940), or Yinguang for short, was a Chinese Buddhist monk and considered the Thirteenth Patriarch of the Pure Land tradition. Yinguang lived during the rapid societal changes of the Republic of China, and is credited as a leader in the modern Buddhist revival movement. Yinguang promoted traditional Pure Land practices, such as reciting the nianfo, in a way that resonated with modern society. In Chinese Buddhist tradition, he is also widely regarded as an emanation of the Bodhisattva Mahāsthāmaprāpta.

== Biography ==
Yinguang was born in 1861 as Zhao Shaoyi (Chinese: 赵绍伊) in Shanxi Province, the youngest of three children, to Zhao Bing Gang (Chinese: 赵秉纲). Yinguang suffered from conjunctivitis, and suffered from poor vision in his youth, but after recovering he was put to studying the Confucian classics in order to prepare for Imperial civil service exams.

After the death of a schoolmate, Yinguang reportedly took a more active interest in Buddhism.

In 1881, Yinguang first ordained as a novice monk on Mount Zhongnan, at Lotus Flower Cave Temple (simplified Chinese: 莲花洞寺; traditional Chinese: 蓮花洞寺; pinyin: Lian Hua Dong Si), but was dragged back home by his older brother on a pretense that their mother was ill. Yinguang later ran away from home and returned to Lotus Flower Cave Temple for good. There his role was a temple librarian, which required sunning scriptures to dry them out and prevent mildew. This allowed him more time to read scriptures.

During the 1880s Yinguang traveled to various temples to study Pure Land Buddhism. He spent some time at Beijing's Hongluo Temple studying Pure Land Buddhism. This temple had been a center of Pure Land study and practice since the Qing Dynasty, when it was home to Bhiksu Da Mo, author of a sub-commentary to Patriarch Ouyi's Essence of the Amitabha Sutra.

By 1893, having traveled to a number of temples in search of Pure Land Buddhist teachings, Yinguang settled at Fayu Temple (Chinese: 法雨寺) on Mount Putuo. From here, he undertook the collection of funds to print and redistribute Buddhist texts on Pure Land teachings to a wider audience. By the 1910s, he had attracted a following of educated Buddhist laypeople who assisted in his endeavor. By 1918, they distributed books by Yinguang including the Grand Antiquity Inner Response Book (Chinese: 太上感應篇; pinyin: Tai Shang Gan Ying Pian), and the All Embracing Four Methods of Training (Chinese: 了凡四訓; pinyin: Le Fan Si Xun) among others.

In the 1920s Yinguang traveled in Nanjing promoting prison reform, social welfare and disaster relief. Such efforts continued until 1937 during the breakout of the Second Sino-Japanese War, where Yinguang relocated to Lingyanshan Temple (simplified Chinese: 灵岩山寺; traditional Chinese: 靈岩山寺; pinyin: Ling Yun Shan) which would be his last residence. In December 1940, Yinguang fell ill, and died on December 2 while seated in a lotus position.

== Emanation of Mahāsthāmaprāpta ==
Yinguang is commonly regarded as an emanation of the Bodhisattva Mahāsthāmaprāpta based on the accounts of two people who had separate individual dreams about him.

The first was a middle school student named Yang Xinfeng (Chinese: 楊信芳) who had never heard of either Mahāsthāmaprāpta or Yinguang before her dream. During her visit at a friend's house, she had a dream where the Bodhisattva Guanyin told her about Yinguang's sermons at Shanghai (where he was visiting at the time), as well as revealed that Yinguang was an incarnation of Mahāsthāmaprāpta whose mission of teaching sentient beings would be fulfilled in four years. After the dream, Yang checked up regarding Mahāsthāmaprāpta and Yinguang's existence, and managed to verify that he was indeed lecturing in Shanghai at the time, whereupon she visited him and took refuge under him. When she visited Yinguang again some time after her first visit in order to ask him about her dream, Yinguang admonished her by denying the contents of her dream and told her to never tell anyone it. Yang only submitted her testimonial and eulogy when Yinguang did passed away four years after her dream.

The second individual was a former Christian named Zhang Ruzhao (Chinese: 张汝钊), who later became a poet and an eminent bhikkhunī of the Tiantai tradition by the name of Benkong (Chinese: 本空). Zhang first met Yinguang in 1928 during a visit to Mount Putuo. Zhang and her friends with whom she was visiting were spending a lot time swimming in the sea, which prompted Yinguang to send a monk warning them of dangerous whirlpools in the area, which were known to have claimed many lives in the past. This led to Zhang meeting and later exchanging correspondence with Yinguang, whose literary works she admired. While she only met Yinguang in person three times in her life, she kept multiple correspondence with him via letters. She was later inspired by Yinguang to convert to Buddhism, and eventually became ordained as a bhikkhunī in 1940, two years before Yinguang's passing. In 1950, Benkong was approached to write an article commemorating the tenth anniversary of Yinguang's passing. On the following night, she had a dream where Yinguang appeared to her in the radiant form of Mahāsthāmaprāpta and promised to receive her into the Pure Land of Amitābha, whereupon she clasped her hands and recited a poetic verse she had composed in praise of Mahāsthāmaprāpta. Benkong submitted her testimonial as part of her memorial essay in memory of Yinguang.

== Teachings ==
According to Charles B Jones, Yinguang's teachings espoused a return to traditional Chinese ethics, focusing on rebirth in the Pure Land through recitation of the nianfo along with other complementary Buddhist practices, and practicing charity in this life. He discouraged a psychological interpretation of the Pure Land and focused on a more literal one located to the West. Unlike other contemporary teachers, Yinguang maintained a more traditional Chinese Buddhist stance, but with an emphasis on modern social welfare and delineating orthodox Buddhist teachings from traditional Chinese folklore.

Yinguang criticized the practice of spirit writing, contending that it was heterodox superstition and that the messages transmitted via through the practice misrepresented Buddhism.

Yinguang's writings included a number of defenses of the Pure Land Buddhist teachings against criticism from the Chan Buddhist tradition, such as the Treatise Resolving Doubts about the Pure Land (Chinese: 浄土決疑論; pinyin: Jìngtǔ Juéyí lùn). The opening text of the Treatise begins with Yinguang's autobiography, concerning his own despair towards his poor fortune in life, and his fears that he would fail to attain Buddhahood in this life, then pivots toward a careful rebuttal of criticisms by an unnamed Chan Buddhist monk. The Treatise meticulously analyzes source material in the Chinese Buddhist canon to defend Pure land against common arguments.
