= Buddhist liturgy =

Buddhist ritual texts performed during daily liturgical services

Buddhist liturgy is a formalized service of veneration and worship performed within a Buddhist Sangha community in nearly every traditional denomination and tradition in the Buddhist world. It is often done one or more times a day and can vary amongst the Theravada, Mahayana, and Vajrayana sects.

Liturgies typically consist of chanting or recitation of sūtra(s) or passages from a sūtra, mantras and dhāraṇīs (especially in Mahayana and Vajrayana), gāthās and verses of praises to Buddhist deities and figures as well as other types of rituals like dedications of offerings to the Buddhas, repentance rites as well as food bestowal rites. Depending on what practice the practitioner wishes to undertake, it can be done at a temple or at home. The liturgy is almost always performed in front of an object or objects of veneration and accompanied by offerings of light, incense, water and/or food.

== Chinese Buddhist liturgy (chaomu kesong) ==
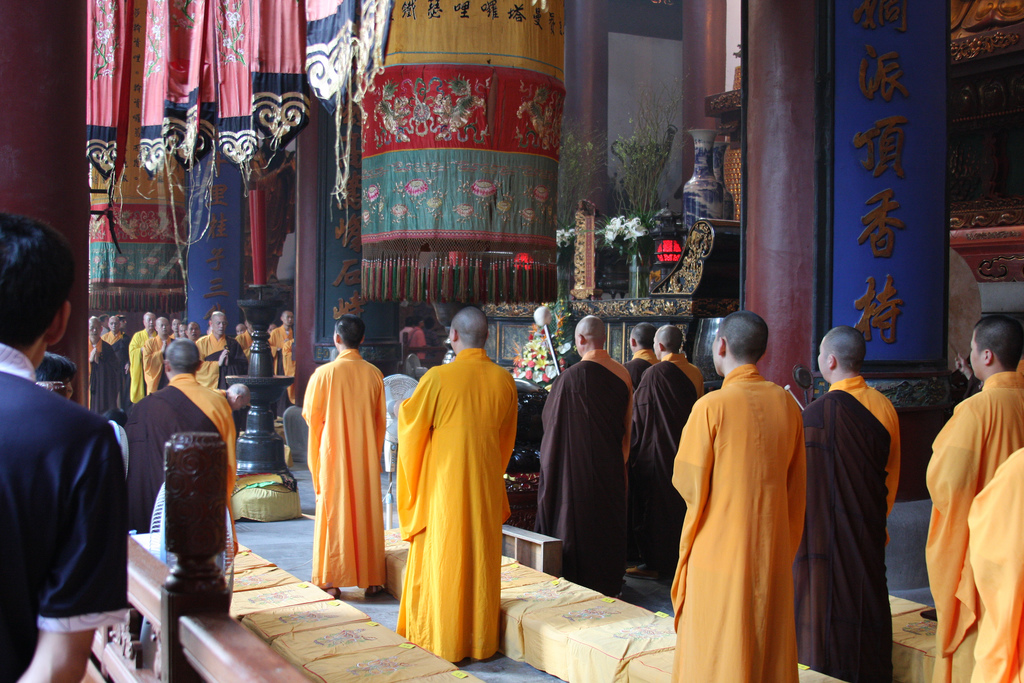
Chinese Buddhist monks performing a formal ceremony in Hangzhou, Zhejiang, China.

=== Overview ===
The traditional Chinese Buddhist liturgy that is performed during daily service is typically referred to as the zhāo mù kè sòng (朝幕課誦, lit: "Morning and Evening Chants") and is usually ordered into the morning session, called the zaoke (早課), and the evening session, called the wanke (晚課).

Vocal performances of the liturgy can be classified into several different categories, namely: nian (念, lit: "recitation"), song (誦, lit: "chanting") and chang (唱, lit: "singing"). During performances, sūtras are usually read on a single note with a regular beat that may progressively speed up, mantras and dhāraṇīs are chanted, and gāthās of praises are sung on a regular metric form with the use of melodies composed from precise pitches. In particular, Chinese Buddhist ritual chanting performed in a distinctively clear, melodious, and resonate voice is specially termed fanbai (梵唄, lit: "the speech of Brahmā"). Traditional Chinese musical instruments are also frequently employed, such as the gong, the muyu (木魚, wooden fish), the qing (磬, sounding stones), the gu (鼓, drums), the zhong (鐘, bells), the chazi (镲仔, cymbals), the yinqing (引磬, a type of hand bell) and the dangzi (鐺子, a small handheld gong). In addition, different provinces in China, overseas Chinese communities and even individual temples preserve multiple different regional traditions of musical performance.

=== Liturgical texts ===
Full digitalized text of a 1900 edition of the Chanmen Risong (禪門日誦), a compilation of liturgical texts for daily and regular ritual services that has been used since the Qing dynasty (1644–1912) to the modern period.

Full digitalized text of a re-edited edition of the Risong Jingzhou Jianyao Keyi (日誦經咒簡要科儀), another compilation of liturgical texts for daily ritual services that was first published in 1937.

The liturgy typically combines practices and techniques from various traditions in Chinese Buddhism, such as bowing and walking meditation from Chan, nianfo practices and devotion towards Amituofo from Pure Land as well as mantra recitation from Esoteric Buddhism. Sitting meditation often occurs before or after the liturgy.

Various different compilations of texts for daily liturgical service and other rituals have been documented historically. One of the most influential examples is the Ming dynasty (1368–1644) Zhujing Risong Jiyao (諸經日誦集要, lit: "Compilation of Essentials for the Daily Chanting of Various Sūtras") which was originally critically revised and edited by the eminent monk Yunqi Zhuhong (雲棲袾宏, 1535–1615), who was the Eighth Patriarch of the Chinese Pure Land tradition According to Zhuhong's account in his preface to his manual, he was motivated to create a new liturgical manual after seeing that another manual that was in wide circulation at the time contained false scriptures. Using that manual as a foundation, Zhuhong removed the erroneous material while inserting new scriptures and mantras into the text, thus compiling the Zhujing Risong Jiyao. He then printed it and sent it into circulation. During a later reprinting, he made even more revisions and printed it as a booklet, which was preserved at his temple on Mount Yunqi in Hangzhou. As the abbot of his temple, Zhuhong also used the Zhujing Risong Jiyao to standardize the daily practices and system of training of his monastic saṃgha. Zhuhong's Zhujing Risong Jiyao was later reprinted by the eminent monk Ouyi Zhixu (蕅益智旭, 1599–1655), who was the Ninth Patriarch of the Chinese Pure Land tradition and Thirty-First Patriarch of the Tiantai tradition. Zhixu and the monks at Zhuhong's temple at the time re-edited the Zhujing Risong Jiyao and moreover added some elements from the Vinaya canon that would be inspirational and helpful for beginners before reprinting and circulating.

In contemporary times, several different compilations have seen usage among different temples and lineages. One example is the Chanmen Risong (禪門日誦; lit: "Daily Chants of the Chan Gate"), a compilation whose earliest printed edition that is extant dates back to 1723 during the Qing dynasty and which was printed at Hoi Tong Monastery. Various subsequent editions with minor changes were published during the rest of the Qing dynasty period (1644–1912) through to the Republican era (1912–1949) by various temples. In the 21st century, one of the most popular editions has been the version that was originally published by Tianning Temple in Changzhou, which has seen modern reprints by retailers and publishers. Another example is the Fomen Bibei (佛門必備課誦本, lit: "Book of Essential Chants of the Buddhist Gate") which was first published during the Republican era and has also seen modern reprints. Both of these compilations show heavy influences from the earlier Zhujing Risong Jiyao by Yunqi Zhuhong. Another liturgical compilation that has seen contemporary usage is the Risong Jingzhou Jianyao Keyi (日誦經咒簡要科儀, lit: "Concise Rituals for the Daily Chanting of Sūtras and Mantras") that was first published in 1937 during the Republican era by the Honghua Society (弘化社), an organization that was founded by the eminent monk and Thirteenth Patriarch of the Chinese Pure Land tradition, Yinguang (印光, 1862–1940).

Full digitalized text of a revised edition of the Erke hejie called the Chongding erke hejie (重訂二課合解), which provides commentaries on the proceedings of the traditional zaoke and wanke services.

Commentaries have also been written on the significance and structure of the rituals proceedings, such as an influential and comprehensive volume called the Erke Hejie (二課合解, lit: "Compiled Explanations on the Two Services") by the Republican era Tiantai monk Guanyue Xingci (觀月興慈, 1881 – 1950) and another extensive work called the Chaomu Kesong Baihua Jieshi (朝暮課誦白話解釋, lit: "Explanations on the Morning and Evening Services in the Common Vernacular") by Huang Zhihai^{[zh]} (黄智海, 1875–1961), a Buddhist scholar who was a student of Yinguang.

Some common ritual proceedings specified by many daily liturgies include:

- Refuge in the Triple Gem (three times)
- Incense offering praise (on certain occasions)
- Sūtra Opening Verse
- Sūtra Reading
- Dhāraṇī recitation
- Food offering to hungry ghosts (evening only)
- Nianfo
- Refuge in the Triple Gem
- Offering to Weituo (morning) or Qielan (evening)
- Transfer of merits
- Meal offering dhāraṇī (供養咒, morning and before noon only)
- Verses for concluding the meal (結齋偈)
- Bowing in homage to ancestral patriarchs (on certain occasions)

Typically, more specialized rituals and ceremonies that are regularly scheduled either weekly or monthly or annually, such as the various types of repentance rites (懺悔), gongfo zhaitian rites (供佛齋天) where offerings are made to the Buddhas and deities, Yujia Yankou rites or the Shuilu Fahui ceremony have their own dedicated liturgical texts as well. In addition, many Buddhas, Bodhisattvas and dharmapalas have their own dedicated annual days of remembrance where special liturgies are sung in praise of them.

=== Zaoke (Morning Service) ===
Many contemporary liturgical texts follow a similar order of recitation for the zaoke service, with some variations between texts such as the addition or substitution of sections like eulogies and gāthās of praise. Some compilations also append a short commentary by the eminent Qing dynasty monk and National Preceptor Yulin Tongxiu (玉林通琇, 1614–1675) on the structure of the zaoke service called the Zaoke lunguan (早課綸貫). An example of an order of recitations is as follows:

1. A eulogy called the Baoding zan (寶鼎讚, lit: "Praise of the Jewelled Censure"), which is typically only chanted during the first and fifteenth day of each lunar month.
2. The Lengyan Zhou (楞嚴咒), or the Śūraṅgama mantra. According to Yulin's commentary, the purpose of the mantra is to regulate the five desires (i.e fame, lust, food, sleep and money) before they are able to arise so that the mind is able to quickly penetrate and directly reveal the true nature of the Tathāgatagarbha.
3. The Dabei zhou (大悲咒), or the Nīlakaṇṭha Dhāraṇī. According to Yulin's commentary, the purpose of the mantra is to purify the mind.
4. The Ten Small Mantras, a grouping that is known in Chinese as the Shi xiao zhou (十小咒;):
  1. The Ruyi Baolunwang Tuoloni (如意寶輪王陀羅尼), or the Cintāmani Cakravartin Dhāraṇī. Associated with Ruyilun Guanyin, an esoteric manifestation of the Bodhisattva Guanyin.
  2. The Xiaozai Jixiang Shenzhou (消災吉祥神咒), or the Jvala Mahaugra Dhāraṇī. Yulin's commentary states that the function of this mantra is to prevents calamities and brings good fortune.
  3. The Gongde Baoshan Shenzhou (功德寶山神咒), or the Guna Ratna Sila Dhāraṇī.
  4. The Zhunti Shenzhou (準提神咒), or the Mahācundi Dhāraṇī. Associated with the Bodhisattva Zhunti, a bodhisattva who is sometimes regarded as an esoteric manifestation of the Bodhisattva Guanyin. Yulin's commentary states that this mantra can completely eradicate all obstructions regarding phenomena to reveal the Dharma-nature in its fullness.
  5. The Dasheng Wuliangshou Jueding Guangmingwang Tuoluoni (大乘無量壽決定光明王陀羅尼), or the Aparimitāyur-jñāna-suviniścita-tejo-rājāya Dhāraṇī. According to Yulin's commentary, the purpose of the mantra is to entreat Wuliangshou Jueding Guangmingwang Rulai, the Buddha summoned by the mantra, to bestow wisdom-life upon the celebrants.
  6. The Yaoshi Guangding Zhenyan (藥師灌頂真言), or the Bhaiṣajyaguru Vaiḍūrya Prabhasa Tathāgatā Abhisecani Dhāraṇī. Associated with the Buddha Yaoshi. According to Yulin's commentary, the mantra further enhances the celebrants' wisdom so that it becomes like crystal encompassing a jeweled moon within.
  7. The Guanyin Linggan Zhenyan (觀音靈感真言), or the Āryavalokiteśvarā Bodhisattva Vikurvana Dhāraṇī. Associated with the Bodhisattva Guanyin. According to Yulin's commentary, the mantra allows the reciter to mesh with Guanyin's ear-organ and the entire Dharma Realm.
  8. The Qifo Miezui Zhenyan (七佛滅罪真言), or the Sapta Atītabuddha Karshaṇīya Dhāraṇī. Associated with the Seven Buddhas of Antiquity. Yulin's commentary states that the mantra allows reciters to root out karma.
  9. The Wangsheng zhou (往生咒), or the Amitābha Pure Land Rebirth Dharani. Associated with the Buddha Amituofo. Yulin's commentary states that the reciters use the mantra as a way to request Amituofo to certify rebirth in the Pure Land of Sukhāvatī.
  10. The Da Jixiang Tiannü Zhou (大吉祥天女咒), or the Shrīdevī Dhāraṇī. Associated with the Buddhist goddess Jixiang Tiannü.
5. The Bore Xinjing (般若心經), or the Heart Sūtra. Yulin's commentary states that the purpose of reciting the Bore Xinjing is to prevent the reciters from becoming attached to states of contemplation that occur during chanting due to its teaching on the nature on emptiness.
6. The Ten Great Vows of the Bodhisattva Puxian (普賢菩薩十大願), which come from the final chapter of the Avataṃsaka Sūtra.
7. Three Refuges (三皈依) in the Buddha, Dharma and Sangha along with transfer of merit.
8. The Da Jixiang Tiannü Zhou (大吉祥天女咒), or the Shrīdevī Dhāraṇī is recited again.
9. Gāthās of praises to the dharmapala Weituo.
10. Verses of homage as well as prostrations to past Buddhist Patriarchs (禮祖).

=== Wanke (Evening Service) ===
Some compilations also append another short commentaries by Yulin on the structure of the wanke service called the Wanke lunguan (晚課綸貫). An example of an order of recitations is as follows:

1. The Amituo Jing (阿彌陀經), or the Amitābha Sūtra. Yulin's commentary states that the sūtra will awaken the chanter to the wonderful rewards of Amituofo's Pure Land of Sukhāvatī and encourage them to aspire for rebirth there by practicing nianfo. This is typically recited during the wanke on odd-numbered days.
2. The Wangsheng Zhou (往生咒), or the Amitabha Pure Land Rebirth Dharani. Yulin's commentary states that the purpose of the mantra is to pull out the roots of karmic obstructions and entreat Amituofo to guanrantee rebirth in Sukhāvatī.
3. The Eighty-eight Buddhas Repentance Ceremony (八十八佛大懺悔文), where the chanters prostrate while chanting the names of Eighty-eight Buddhas. This is typically recited during the wanke on even-numbered days.
4. The Mengshan Shishi (蒙山施食, lit: "Mengshan food bestowal), a ritual aimed at feeding hungry ghosts which has its own liturgical section containing various mantras and verses, including mantras related to the Bodhisattvas Guanyin and Dizang.
5. The Bore Xinjing (般若心經), or the Heart Sūtra. Yulin's commentary states that it is recited to impart knowledge regarding emptiness to the hungry ghosts so that they may come to the understanding that both offenses and blessings have no host and that people and dharmas are empty.
6. The Wangsheng Zhou (往生咒), or the Amitabha Pure Land Rebirth Dharani, is recited again.
7. A few gāthās in praise of Amituofo and deliverance before the nianfo is chanted many times.
8. Three Refuges (三皈依) in the Buddha, Dharma and Sangha along with transfer of merit.

== Japanese Buddhist liturgy (gongyō) ==
In Japan, gongyō is also sometimes called o-tsutome (お勤め) or shōjin (精進). All three terms are common Japanese words and none is specific to any particular sect or school.

=== Origin of the word "gongyō" ===
The word gongyō originated in ancient China; although nowadays it is more often used in Buddhism, it first appeared in the Taoism classic Zhuang Zi. Its original meaning is "assiduous or hard and frequent walking/practice".

Chinese philosopher Zhuangzi abstracted and modified this word from an earlier classic of Taoism – Laozi's Tao Te Ching, in which it states:“上士聞道，勤而行之”, which means taking effort and practicing. During the Sui and Tang dynasties, the Buddhist philosophy developed dramatically in central China. Chinese Buddhist philosophers borrowed this word from Taoist classics, and it spread to Korea, Japan, Vietnam with Buddhism.

=== Pure Land Buddhism ===
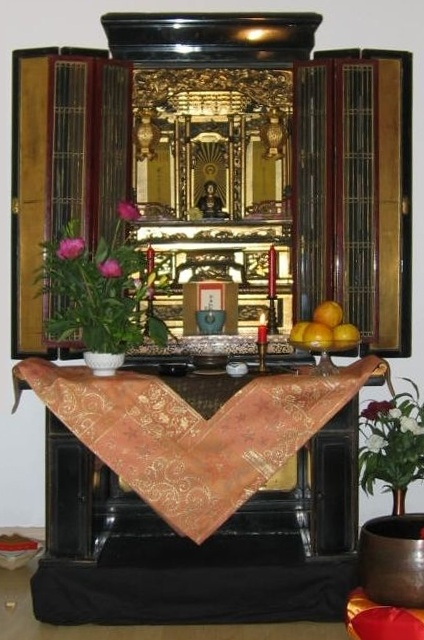
Butsudan with enshrined Amida Buddha

The concept of gongyō is also common in Japanese Pure Land Buddhist schools such as Jodo Shu and Jodo Shinshu. The central practice of these schools is the recitation of the name of Amida, also called the nembutsu, but in daily practice a Pure Land practitioner will also chant excerpts of the Larger Sūtra of Immeasurable Life, particular the sections titled the Sanbutsuge or the Juseige, and in some temples chanting the entire Smaller Sūtra of Immeasurable Life may occur once daily or alternatively only on more formal occasions.

In larger Pure Land temples, the daily service is performed by priests or ministers, and lay people can optionally attend and recite along if they wish. The times for these services will vary depending on the individual branch, and individual temple.

In traditional Jodo Shinshu Buddhism, lay practitioners may also chant a hymn written by Shinran called the Shoshinge, which is not a sutra per se, but expounds the lineage with which Jodo Shinshu owes its beliefs. A shorter hymn called the Junirai, the Twelve Praises of Amida, can be used as well.

In Jodo Shu, the nembutsu (Namu Amida Butsu) is often recited is specific format:

- Jūnen: The nembutsu is recited 8 times in one breath, without the final 'tsu' sound, then recited fully in one breath, and recited a final time without the 'tsu' sound again. This is 10 recitations total
- Nembutsu Ichie: The nembutsu is repeated as many times as the practitioners choose to.
- Sanshōrai: The nembutsu is recited 3 times in a long, drawn-out fashion, after which the practitioner bows. This process is repeated twice more for a total of 9 recitations.

=== Shingon Buddhism ===
The gongyō of Shingon Buddhism differs amongst various sub-sects, but all of them mainly recite the Hannya Shingyo, the mantras of the Thirteen Buddhas and other mantras, the Light Mantra, and the gohogo; the saintly name of Kukai. In addition, recitation of other texts such as the Prajanaparamita-naya Sūtra (Rishukyo), the Samantamukha chapter of the Lotus Sūtra, longer mantras, and praises in mantra form are common in temples where priests reside. gongyō is important for lay Shingon Buddhists to follow since the practice emphasizes meditation of the body, speech and mind of a buddha.

=== Nichiren Buddhism ===
Nichiren Buddhists perform a form of gongyō that consists of reciting certain passages of the Lotus Sūtra and chanting daimoku. The format of gongyō varies by denomination and sect. Some, like Nichiren Shoshu and Nichiren Shu, have a prescribed formula which is longheld in their practice, while others such as the Soka Gakkai International variedly change their gongyō formats depending on modernity, the most recent being the 2015 edition of their liturgy format.

==== Soka Gakkai International ====
In the Soka Gakkai International (SGI), gongyō is performed to "return to the very foundation of our lives" and "draw wisdom" from inherent Buddha nature, and achieves "the fusion or reality and wisdom"

Nichiren established no formal procedure for gongyō other than the recitation of the 2nd and 16th chapters of the Lotus Sūtra, and at times even just the verse section of the 16th chapter. Hence the format had changed from time to time through the centuries. At the time the Soka Gakkai came into being, Nichiren Buddhist laity were not expected to do gongyō themselves; priests did it on their behalf. The first two presidents of the Soka Gakkai, Tsunesaburo Makiguchi and Josei Toda, taught members "not to hire priests to chant, as had long been customary, but to chant for themselves, a change they found both disarming and empowering"

The current format has evolved over the years. Originally, it followed the format of Nichiren Shoshu. In the 1970s, silent prayers were added for the success of the Soka Gakkai itself, and in memory of its first two deceased presidents, in addition to prayers for Nichiren and his disciple Nikko. Currently, after the recitation of the 2nd chapter and the verse section of the 16th chapter, daimoku is chanted for as long as desired, after which all the silent prayers are recited to conclude gongyō. The SGI's version of sutra recitation takes approximately 5 minutes, leaving more time for the primary practice of chanting Nam-myoho-renge-kyo. As of 2015, the silent prayers currently are: gratitude to the Gohonzon, to Nichiren, and to his immediate successor Nikko; appreciation for the three founding presidents of the organization; a prayer for the fulfillment of the great vow for worldwide kosen-rufu, for the human revolution and attainment of goals of the practitioner, and for the deceased; and finally for the happiness of all living beings. It is emphasized by the Soka Gakkai, however, that more important than the wording of the prayers is the practitioner's heartfelt intent in doing gongyō and expressing his or her appreciation and desires.

==== Nichiren Shu ====
Nichiren Shu has many types of gongyō a person can perform. One example of family service procedure is as follows:

1. Invocation (Invitation to the Buddha, Dharma and Samgha to be present at this service)
2. Kaikyo-ge (Opening Canon)
3. Lotus Sūtra Ch. 2 Hoben-pon
4. Lotus Sūtra Ch. 16 Juryo-hon (Jiga-ge)
5. Chanting Odaimoku Namu Myoho Renge Kyo
6. Lotus Sūtra last part of Ch. 11 Hoto-ge (The difficulty in keeping this Sūtra)
7. Prayer
8. Four Great Vows:

Sentient beings are innumerable; I vow to save them all.
Our evil desires are inexhaustible; I vow to quench them all.
The Buddha's teachings are immeasurable; I vow to study them all.
The way of the Buddha is unexcelled; I vow to attain the path sublime.

- Chapter 2 (Hoben-pon) and Chapter 16 (Juryo-hon) are recited the most frequently;
- Chapter 12 Daibadatta-hon,
- Chapter 16 in its entirety
- Chapter 21 Jinriki-hon (whole or from "Shobukkusesha") or
- Chapter 25 Kannon-gyo.

Recitation of the Lotus Sūtra can be performed in Shindoku or one's own preferred language.

There is additional form of gongyō performed by Nichiren Shu practitioners at homes and in temples in which the entire Lotus Sūtra is recited over the course of 32 days.

==== Nichiren Shoshu ====
The Buddhist service of “Gon-Gyo” (勤行, Persevering Action) is the basic supplemental service of Hokkeko believers. In the Head Temple of the sect, it is conducted first as the Ushitora gongyō at the Dai Kyakuden (Grand Reception Hall), among other places throughout the Head Temple. In the past centuries, the service was performed in five different locations:

- Facing the Sunrise direction
- Facing the Mieido
- Facing the Gohozon
- Facing the Kyakuden
- Facing the Mutsubo

The sect, along with the other Fuji sects in the area followed the custom of reciting the Sūtra chapters according to what Nichiren himself once did:

- Junyoze — Reciting the prose (散文, “Sanbun”) of Chapter 2
- Seoge — Reciting the verse (自我偈, “Jigage”) of Chapter 2
- Chogyo — Reciting the prose (“Sanbun”) of Chapter 16
- Nyorai Juryo — Reciting the verse (“Jigage”) of Chapter 16

During the 1930s, the gongyō service was shortened to a single format, initiated by religious convert Tsunesaburo Makiguchi and was approved by 57th High Priest Nissho Shonin. Today, some Nichiren Sects in the Mount Fuji area recite the full four versions of the 2nd and 16th Chapter of the Lotus Sūtra.

=== Current practice ===
At present, gongyō is performed twice daily, upon rising and before retiring ("Often translated as morning and evening gongyō"). Its recitations of the Lotus Sūtra are composed of the following:

- The prose section of the second chapter
- The prose and verse section of the 16th chapter (2nd recitation only)
- The verse section of the 16th chapter.
- Prolonged Hiki-Daimoku with five or three silent prayers.

In total, the following format is observed:

- Five sutra recitations are made each morning (silent prayers 1–5).
- Three sutra recitations are made each evening (silent prayers 2,3,5).

These five morning and three “silent prayers” style (五座三座, Goza-Sanza) for the purpose of the following:

1. Protection from the Buddhist gods (Shoten Zenjin)
2. Prayer to the Dai Gohonzon
3. Prayer for lineage or the priesthood
4. Conversion of the Emperor of Japan and widespread propagation.
5. Prayers for the dead ancestors.

Members of the sect may only use Juzu prayer beads with pure white cords and white Pom-Pom ornaments, having been consecrated by a Nichiren Shoshu priest at a local temple, while Nichiren Shoshu priests use an additional set of Juzu prayer beads with white string tassels.

The brief rubbing of Juzu prayer beads is permitted in the beginning of ceremonies, but the habit of constant rubbing throughout ceremonies is deemed immodest and is prohibited during both gongyō and Shodai (prolonged chanting).

== See also ==
- Metta Sutta
- Mangala Sutta
- Ratana Sutta
- Awgāthā, Burmese Buddhist Devotion
- Buddhist chant
- Puja (Buddhism)
