= Śrīmahādevī =

East Asian Buddhist deity

Śrīmahādevī (Buddhism)
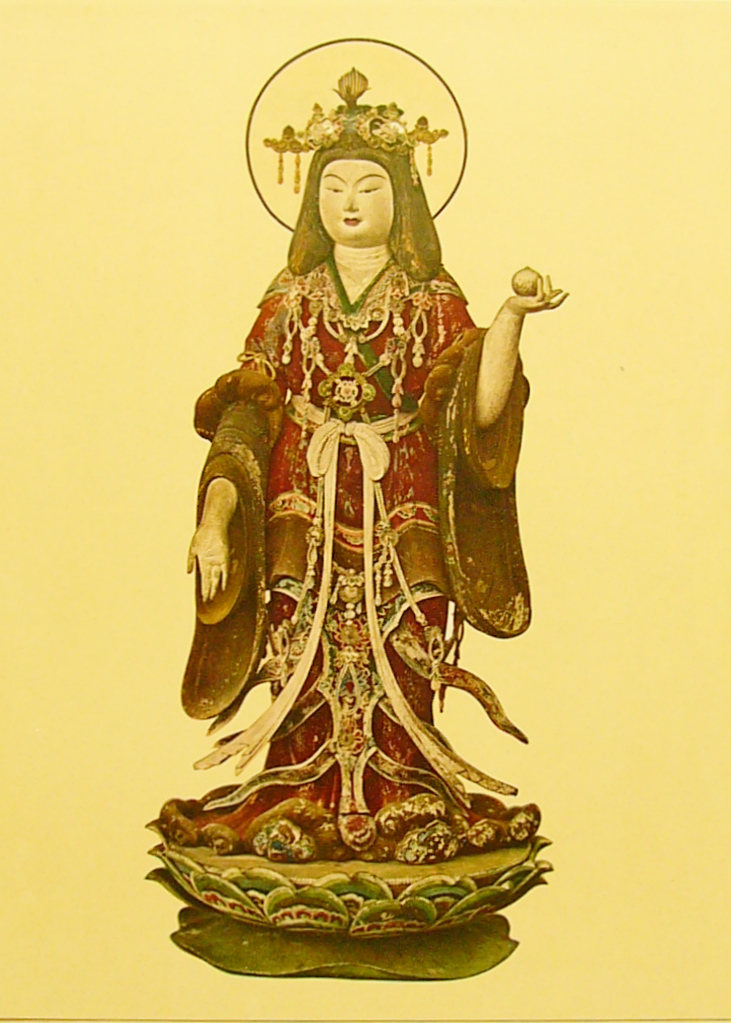
- Sanskrit: श्रीमहादेवी Śrīmahādevī
- Chinese: 吉祥天 (Pinyin: Jíxiáng tiān)
- Japanese: 吉祥天(きっしょうてん) or 吉祥天(きちじょうてん) (romaji: Kichijōten)
- Korean: 길상천 (RR: Gilsang Cheon)
- Tagalog: Slimahadevi
- Tibetan: ལྷ་མོ་ཆེན་མོ་དཔལ།་ Wylie: lha mo chen mo dpal
- Vietnamese: Cát Tường Thiên

Information
- Venerated by: Mahāyāna, Vajrayāna

Śrīmahādevī, (Chinese: 吉祥天, pinyin: Jíxiángtiān, romaji: Kichijōten or Kisshōten, lit: "Auspicious Devi"), also known as Lakshmi (Chinese: 功德天, pinyin: Gōngdétiān, romaji: Kudokuten, lit: "Meritorious Devi"), is a devi in Mahayana Buddhism. She is particularly respected in East Asian Buddhist traditions as a protector deity due to her appearance in the Golden Light Sutra where she introduced her mantra and made vows to protect any bhikṣu who will uphold and teach the sutra.

== Iconography ==
In Buddhist iconographic form, based on her description in the Golden Light Sutra, she usually holds the cintāmaṇi jewel in her left hand and forms a mudra with her right hand, sometimes with a headdress and a phoenix/fenghuang/hōō.

== China ==
In Chinese Buddhism, Śrīmahādevī is referred to as either Jixiang Tiannü (吉祥天女) or Gongdetian (功德天), and is the goddess of fortune and prosperity. She is regarded as the sister of Pishamentian (毗沙門天), one of the Four Heavenly Kings. She is also regarded as one of the Twenty-Four Protective Deities, and her image is frequently enshrined in the Daxiong Baodian of most Chinese Buddhist monasteries together with the other deities. Her mantra, the Shrīdevī Dhāraṇī (大吉祥天女咒), is classified as one of the Ten Small Mantras (十小咒), which are a collection of dharanis that are commonly recited in Chinese Buddhist temples during morning liturgical services.

The dharani is as follows:

Sanskrit:

Namo buddhāya, namo dharmāya, namaḥ saṃghāya, namo śrīmahādevīya. Tadyathā: Oṃ paripūrṇacare, samantadarśane, mahāvihāragate, samantavidhāmane mahākāryapratiṣṭhāne, sarvārthasādhane supratipūri, āyānadharmatā mahā-avikopite mahāmaitrī-upasaṃhite, mahākleśe susaṃgṛhīte, samantārthānupālane svāhā.

Traditional Chinese:

南無佛陀。南無達摩。南無僧伽。南無室利。摩訶提鼻耶。怛你也他。波利富樓那。遮利三曼陀。達舍尼。摩訶毗訶羅伽帝。三曼陀。毘尼伽帝。摩訶迦利野。波祢。波囉。波祢。薩利縛栗他。三曼陀。修缽黎帝。富隸那。阿利那。達摩帝。摩訶毗鼓畢帝。摩訶彌勒帝。婁簸僧只帝。醯帝簁。僧只醯帝。三曼陀。阿他阿 [少/免] 。婆羅尼。娑婆訶

Pinyin:

Námó fótuó. Námó dámó. Námó sēngjiā. Námó shìlì. Móhē tíbí yé. Dánǐyětā. Bōlì fùlóunà. Zhēlì sānmàntuó. Dáshění. Móhē píhēluó jiādì. Sānmàntuó. Píní jiādì. Móhē jiālì yě. Bō mí. Bō luō. Bō mí. Sàlì fùlìtā. Sānmàntuó. Xiūbōlí dì. Fùlìnà. Ālìnà. Dámódì. Móhē pígǔbì dì. Móhē mílè dì. Lóubǒ sēngzhǐ dì. Xīdìshāi. Sēngzhǐ xīdì. Sānmàntuó. Ā tā ā [shǎo/miǎn]. Póluóní. Suōpóhē.

== Japan ==
In Japanese Buddhism, Śrīmahādevī is known as either Kishijōten or Kisshōten (吉祥天) and is also the goddess of fortune and prosperity. She is sometimes named as one of the Seven Gods of Fortune, replacing either Jurōjin or Fukurokuju. For example, in the 1783 edition of the Butsuzōzui compendium (reprinted in 1796), Kichijōten replaces Fukurokuju as one of the seven fukujin. She is considered to be the goddess of happiness, fertility, and beauty.

Like in China, Kishijoten is considered the sister of Bishamonten (毘沙門, also known as Tamon or Bishamon-ten), who protects human life, fights evil, and brings good fortune. In ancient and medieval Japan, Kishijoten was the goddess worshiped for luck and prosperity, particularly on behalf of children. Kishijoten was also the guardian goddess of geishas.

== Gallery ==
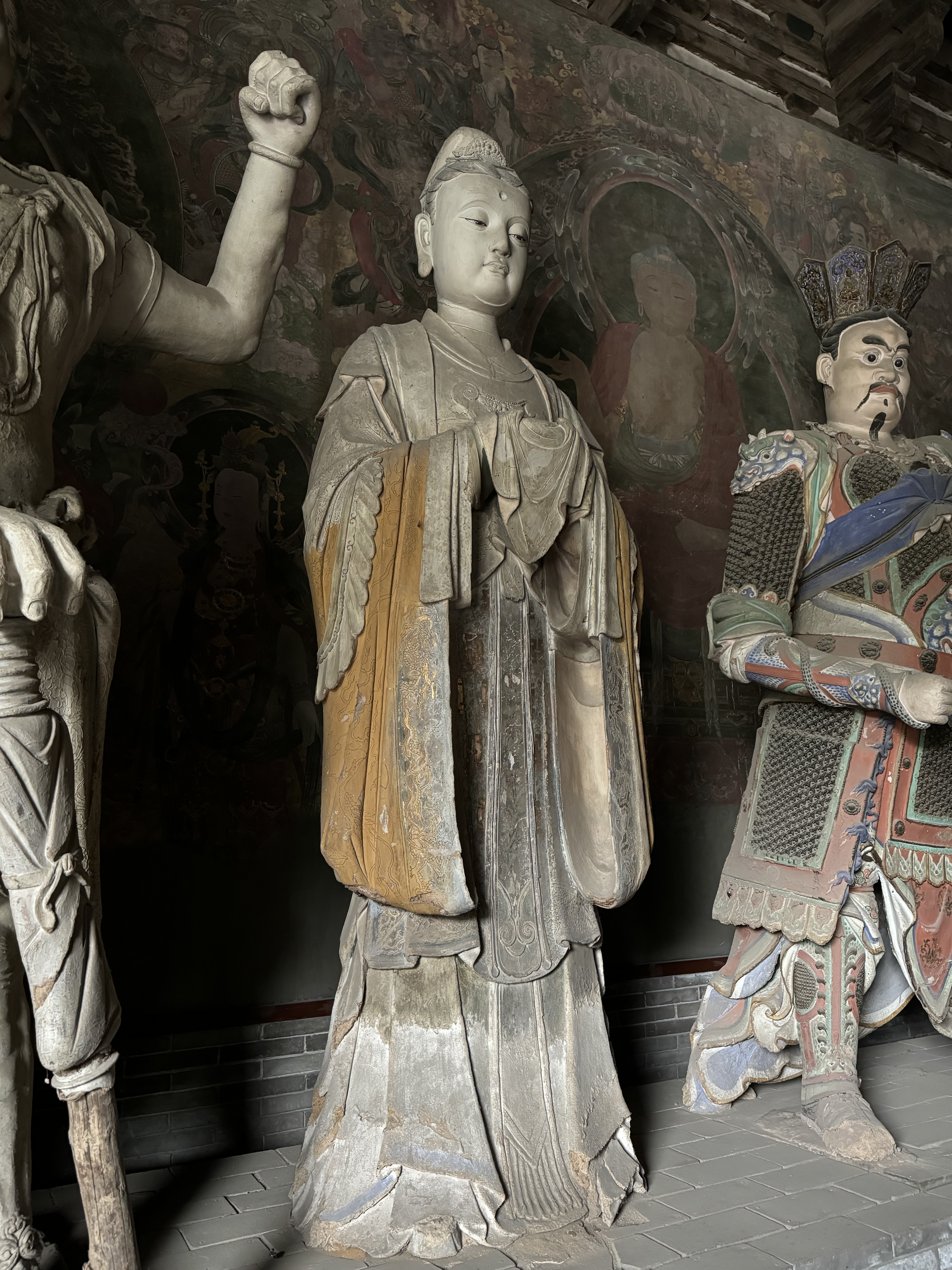
Ming dynasty statue (1368-1644) statue of Jixiang Tiannü as one of the Twenty-Four Protective Deities in Huayan Temple in Datong, Shanxi, China.

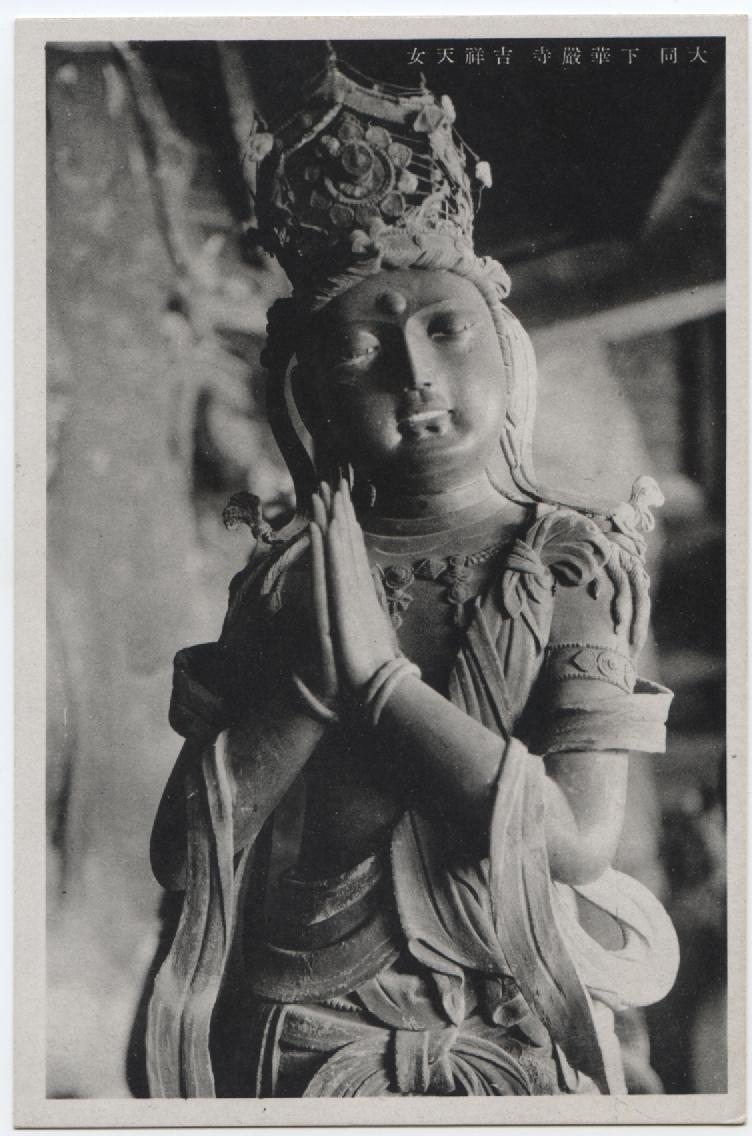
Ming dynasty (1368-1644) statue of Jixiang Tiannü in Huayan Temple in Datong, Shanxi, China.

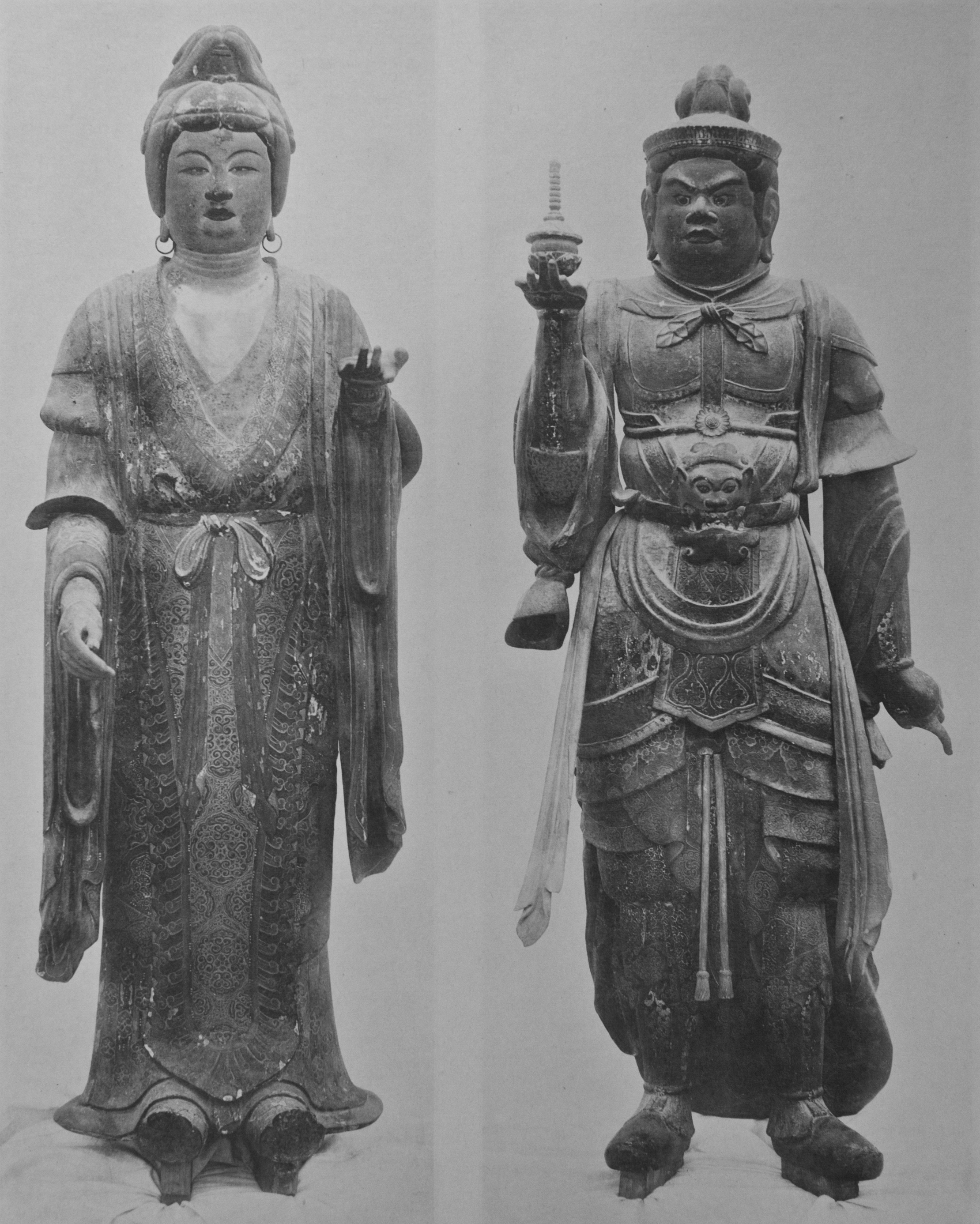
Statues of Bishamonten and Kichijoten in the Kondō of Hōryū-ji.

== See also ==
- Deva (Buddhism)
- Twenty-Four Protective Deities in Chinese Buddhism
- Buddhist deities in Japanese Buddhism
- Seven Lucky Gods
- Kisshō Tennyo (manga)
- Lakshmi
- Cintamani
- Vasudhara (Bodhisattva of good fortune, wealth, fertility, prosperity)
