= Ten Small Mantras =

Subgrouping of esoteric Buddhist mantras

Full digitalized text of a 1900 edition of the Chanmen Risong (禪門日誦), a compilation of liturgical texts for daily and regular Chinese Buddhist ritual services that has been used since the Qing dynasty (1644-1912) to the modern period. The Ten Small Mantras are listed in this text as part of the morning liturgical service.

The Ten Small Mantras (Chinese: 十小咒; pinyin: Shíxiǎozhòu, Sanskrit: Daśa Cula Mantra), or the Ten Mantras (Chinese: 十咒, pinyin: Shízhòu, rōmaji: Jusshu, Vietnamese: Thập Chú), is a subgrouping of esoteric Buddhist mantras or dharanis in Chinese Buddhism, Japanese Ōbaku Zen Buddhism as well as Vietnamese Buddhism.

== History and Practice ==
In China, the earliest extant appearance of this specific grouping is the Ming dynasty (1368-1644) Chinese Buddhist liturgical compilations, the Zhujing Risong Jiyao (諸經日誦集要, lit: "Compilation of Essentials for the Daily Chanting of Various Sūtras"), which was critically revised and edited by the Eighth Chinese Pure Land Patriarch, Yunqi Zhuhong (雲棲袾宏, 1655-1615), and later reprinted by the Ninth Chinese Pure Land Patriarch and Thirty-First Tiantai Patriarch, Ouyi Zhixu (蕅益智旭, 1599-1655). This grouping was subsequently frequently included in most subsequent influential Buddhist liturgical compilations for daily liturgical sessions that were collated during the Qing dynasty (1644-1912) and Republican (1912-1949) eras, eventually becoming standardized as part of the common repertoire chanted by monks, nuns, and laity. Two examples of such liturgical compilations that include the mantras and which are still widely used in contemporary times are the Chanmen Risong (禪門日誦; lit: "Daily Chants of the Chan Gate") and the Fomen Bibei (佛門必備課誦本, lit: "Book of Essential Chants of the Buddhist Gate"). Influential traditional commentaries on the significance of each mantra during liturgical sessions have also been written by various eminent Chinese Buddhist figures, such as the Linji Chan monk Yulin Tongxiu (玉林通琇, 1614 – 1675), who was a teacher of the Qing dynasty Shunzhi Emperor (1638 – 1661), and the Tiantai monk Guanyue Xingci (觀月興慈, 1881 – 1950). In Vietnam, the grouping was transmitted some time during the Ming or Qing dynasty. The mantras are included as part of the repertoire for liturgical services in the Thiền Môn Nhật Tụng, which is the Vietnamese adaptation of the Chinese Chanmen Risong. In Japan, this grouping was transmitted during the end of the Ming dynasty by the eminent Ming dynasty monk Yinyuan Longqi (or Ingen Ryūki), who founded the Ōbaku Zen tradition of Japanese Buddhism. The mantras are included in the Zenrin Kajū (禅林課誦, lit: "Chants of the Zen Forest"), which is a standardized Buddhist liturgical compilations that is used for daily liturgical sessions by Ōbaku monastics.

In China, Taiwan and other overseas Chinese communities, the ten mantras are regularly chanted everyday in most contemporary Chinese Buddhist temples across multiple traditions like Chan, Pure Land and Tiantai as part of standard morning liturgical services through the performance of fanbai, alongside other mantras like the Śūraṅgama mantra as well as sūtras and gathas. In Vietnam, the ten mantras are also typically chanted as part of daily liturgical services in traditions like Thiền Buddhism. In Japan, the ten mantras are chanted through the performance of bonbai (the Japanese reading of fanbai) by contemporary monastics belonging to the Ōbaku Zen tradition. Unlike other Japanese Buddhist traditions, mantras in the Ōbaku tradition are chanted in the Tō-on reading, which is a pronunciation that approximates the Nanjing dialect of Mandarin during the Ming dynasty.

== The Mantras ==
=== Cintāmani Cakravartin Dhāraṇī ===
Cintamaṇi Cakravartin Dhāraṇī (Chinese: 如意寶輪王陀羅尼, Pinyin: Rúyìbǎolúnwáng Tuóluóní; associated with Cintamanicakra):

Language and Romanization	Transcriptions and Translation
Sanskrit	Namo ratnatrayāya nama āryāvalokiteśvarāya bodhisattvāya mahāsattvāya mahākaruṇikāya Tadyathā Oṃ cakravarti cintāmaṇi mahāpadme ru ru tiṣṭha jvala ākarṣāya hūṃ phat ̣svāhā
Traditional Chinese	南無佛馱耶。南無達摩耶。南無僧迦耶。南無觀自在菩薩摩訶薩。具大悲心者。怛侄他。唵。斫羯囉伐底。震多末尼。摩訶。缽蹬謎。嚕嚕嚕嚕。底瑟吒。爍囉阿羯利。沙夜吽。癹莎訶。唵。缽蹋摩。震多末尼。爍囉吽。唵跋喇陀。缽亶謎吽。
Pinyin	Námó fótuó yé. Námó dámó yé. Námó sēngqié yé. Námó guānzìzài púsà móhēsà. Jùdà bēixīnzhě. Dázhítā. Ōng. Zhuójié làfádǐ. Zhènduō mòní. Móhē. Bōdēngmí. Lǔ lǔ lǔ lǔ. Dǐsèzhā. Shuòlà ājiélì. Shāyèhōng. Báshāhē. Ōng. Bōtàmó. Zhènduō mòní. Shuòlàhōng. Ōng bálǎtuó. Bōdǎn míhōng.
Wade-Giles	Na-mo fo-t'o yeh. Na-mo ta-mo yeh. Na-mo seng-ch'ieh yeh. Na-mo kuan-tzu-tsai p'u-sa mo-ho-sa. Chü-ta pei-hsin che. Ta-chih-t'a. An. Cho-chieh la-fa-ti. Chen-to mo-ni. Mo-ho po-teng-mi. Lu lu lu lu. Ti-se-cha. Shuo-la a-chieh-li. Sha-yeh-hung. Pa-sha-ho. Po-t'a-mo. Chen-to mo-ni. Shuo-la-hung. An. Pa-la-t'o. Po-tan mi-hung.
Vietnamese	Nam mô Phật-đà-da. Nam mô Đạt-ma-da. Nam mô Tăng-dà-da. Nam mô Quán Tự Tại Bồ-tát Ma-ha-tát, cụ đại bi tâm giả. Đát điệt tha. Án, chước yết ra phạt để chấn đa mạt ni, ma ha bát đẳng mế, rô rô rô rô, để sắt tra thước ra a yết rị, sa dạ hồng phấn ta ha. Án, bát đạp ma chấn đa mạt ni, thước ra hồng. Án, bát lặc đà, bát đẳng mế hồng.
English	Adoration to the three gems. Adoration to the noble (ārya) Lord (īśvara) who gazes down (avalokita), the enlightened sentient being, the great sentient being, the great compassionate one! Like this: Oṃ! Turn the wheel, the wish-fulfilling jewel, the great lotus, (quick, quick), Flame stays firm! Calling for the holy mind to destroy obstacles, So be it!

=== The Mantra for Dispersing Calamities and Bringing Auspicious Good Will ===
Jvala Mahaugra Dhāraṇī (Chinese: 消災吉祥神咒, Pinyin: Xiāozāi Jíxiáng Shénzhòu):

Language and Romanization	Transcriptions and Translation
Sanskrit	NAMAḤ SAMANTHA BUDDHĀNĀṂ APRATIHATA ŚĀSANANĀṂ TADYATHĀ: OṂ KHA KHA, KHĀHI KHĀHI, HŪṂ HŪṂ JVALA JVALA, PRAJVALA PRAJVALA; TIṢṬHA TIṢṬHA ṢṬRI ṢṬRI SPHOṬA SHPOṬA ŚĀNTIKA ŚRIYE SVĀHĀ
Traditional Chinese	曩謨三滿哆。母馱喃。阿缽囉底。賀多舍。娑曩喃。怛侄他。唵。佉佉。佉呬。佉呬。吽吽。入縛囉。入縛囉。缽囉入嚩囉。缽囉入嚩囉。底瑟奼。底瑟奼。瑟致哩。瑟致哩。娑癹吒。娑癹吒。扇底迦。室哩曳。娑嚩訶。
Pinyin	Nǎngmó sānmǎnduō. Mǔtuónán. Ābōluōdǐ. Hèduōshě. Suōlángnán. Dázhítā. Ōng. Qié qié. Qié xì. Qié xì. Hōng hōng. Rùwālà. Rùwālà. Bōluō rùwālà. Bōluō rùwālà. Dǐsèchà. Dǐsèchà. Sèzhìlī. Sèzhìlī. Suōpōzhā. Suōpōzhā. Shàndǐ jiā. Shìlīyè. Suōpóhē.
Wade-Giles	Nang-mo san-man-to. Mu-t'o-nan. A-po-lo-ti. Ho-to-she. So-lang-nan. Ta-chih-t'a. An. Ch'ieh ch'ieh. Ch'ieh hsi. Ch'ieh hsi. Hung hung. Ju-wa-la. Ju-wa-la. Po-lo ju-wa-la. Po-lo ju-wa-la. Ti-se-ch'a. Ti-se-ch'a. Se-chih-li. Se-chih-li. So-p'o-cha. So-p'o-cha. Shan-ti chia. Shih-li-yeh. So-p'o-ho.
Vietnamese	Nẳng mồ tam mãn đa, mẫu đà nẩm. A bát ra để, hạ đa xá ta nẳng nẩm. Đát điệt tha. Án, khê khê, khê hế, khê hế, hồng hồng, nhập phạ ra, nhập phạ ra, bát ra nhập phạ ra, bát ra nhập phạ ra, để sắc sá, để sắc sá, sắc trí rị, sắc trí rị, ta phấn tra, ta phấn tra, phiến để ca thất rị duệ, ta phạ ha.
English	Adoration to the universal Buddhas (and their) unimpeded religions (śāsana)! Thus: om! in the sky (ākāśa 虛空中), in emptiness, destroy, destroy (all obstacles), the holy mind! the holy mind! Flame, light, brilliant light, brilliant light, stay, stay. Shatter, shatter, burst, burst, disperses calamities (and brings) fortune/opulence (śrī) So be it!

=== Guna Ratna Sila Dhāraṇī ===
Guna Ratna Sila Dhāraṇī (Chinese: 功德寶山神咒, Pinyin: Gōngdé Bǎoshān Shénzhòu; The Meritorious Precious Mountain Dhāraṇī):

Language and Romanization	Transcriptions and Translation
Sanskrit	Namo buddhāya namo dharmāya namaḥ saṃghāya (om ̣) siddhe huru huru sidhuru kṛpā kṛpā siddhāṇi puruṇi svāhā
Traditional Chinese	南無佛馱耶。南無達摩耶。南無僧伽耶。唵。悉帝護嚕嚕。悉都嚕。只利波。吉利婆。悉達哩。布嚕哩。娑嚩訶。
Pinyin	Námó fótuó yé. Námó dámó yé. Námó sēngqié yé. Ōng. Xīdì hùlǔlǔ. Xīdōulǔ. Zhǐlìbō. Jílìpó. Xīdálī. Bùlǔlī. Suōpóhē.
Wade-Giles	Na-mo fo-t'o yeh. Na-mo ta-mo yeh. Na-mo seng-ch'ieh yeh. Hsi-ti hu-lu-lu. Hsi-tou-lu. Chih-li-po. Chi-li-p'o. Hsi-ta-li. Pu-lu-li. So-p'o-ho.
Vietnamese	Nam mô Phật-đà-da. Nam mô Đạt-ma-da. Nam mô Tăng-dà-da. Án, tất đế hộ rô rô, tất đô rô, chỉ rị ba, kiết rị bà tất đạt rị, bố rô rị, ta phạ ha.
English	Adoration to the Buddha! adoration to the Buddhist teaching! adoration to the Buddhist community! Accomplished one, quick, quick, accomplishes quick, be merciful, be compassionate, accomplishes perfectly. So be it!

=== Mahācundi Dhāraṇī ===
Mahācundi Dhāraṇī (Chinese: 準提神咒, Pinyin: Zhǔntí Shénzhòu; associated with Cundi):

Language and Romanization	Transcriptions and Translation
Sanskrit	Namaḥ saptānām samyak-saṃbuddha koṭinām. Tadyathā: Oṃ cale cule Cunde svāhā.
Traditional Chinese	稽首皈依蘇悉帝。頭面頂禮七俱胝。我今稱讚大準提。惟願慈悲垂加護。南無颯哆喃。三藐三菩陀。俱胝喃。怛侄他。唵。折戾主戾。準提娑婆訶。
Pinyin	Qǐshǒu guīyī sūxīdì. Tóumiàn dǐnglǐ qī jù zhī. Wǒ jīn chēngzàn dà zhǔntí. Wéiyuàn cíbēi chuí jiāhù. Námó sàduōnán. Sānmiǎo sānpútuó. Jùzhīnán. Dázhítā. Ōng. Zhélì zhǔlì. Zhǔntí suōpóhē.
Wade-Giles	Ch'i-shou kuei-i su-hsi-ti. T'ou-mien ting-li ch'i-chü-chih. Wo chin ch'eng-tsan ta chunt'i. Wei-yüan tz'u-pei ch'ui chia-hu. Na-mo sa-to-nan. San-miao san-p'u-t'o. Chü-chih-nan. Ta-chih-t'a. Che-li chu-li. Chun-t'i so-p'o-ho.
Vietnamese	Khể thủ quy y Tô tất đế, đầu diện đảnh lễ Thất câu chi. Ngã kim xưng tán Đại Chuẩn Đề, duy nguyện từ bi thùy gia hộ. Nam mô tát đa nẩm, tam miệu tam bồ đề, câu chi nẩm, đát điệt tha. Án, chiết lệ chủ lệ Chuẩn Đề, ta bà ha.
English	I bow in reverence and take refuge in Susiddhi. I prostrate myself before the Seventy Million (Buddhas). I now praise the Great Cundi. Only wishing for the compassionate bestowal of (Cundi's) protection. Adoration to 'seven billions perfect status, perfect enlightened beings', like this: om cha'le chu'le Chundi (the Extreme purity), All hail!

=== Dhāraṇī of the Holy Tathāgata of Immeasurable Lifespan, King of Determined Radiance ===
Aparimitāyur-jñāna-suviniścita-tejo-rājāya Dhāraṇī (Chinese: 大乘無量壽決定光明王陀羅尼, Pinyin: Dàchéng Wúliàngshòu Juédìng Guāngmíngwáng Tuóluóní; associated with Amitābha):

Language and Romanization	Transcriptions and Translation
Sanskrit	Namo Bhagavate Aparimitāyurjñānasuviniścitatejorājāya Tathāgatāya, Arhate, Samyaksaṃbuddhāya. Tadyathā: Oṃ sarva saṃskāra pariśuddha, dharmate gagana samudgate, svabhāva viśuddhe, mahānaya, parivarī svāhā.
Traditional Chinese	唵。捺摩巴葛瓦帝。阿巴囉密沓。阿優哩阿納。蘇必你。實執沓。牒左囉宰也。怛塔哿達也。阿囉訶帝。三藥三不達也。怛你也塔。唵。薩哩巴。桑斯葛哩。叭哩述沓。達囉馬帝。哿哿捺。桑馬兀哿帝。莎巴瓦比述帝。馬喝捺也。叭哩瓦哩娑訶。
Pinyin	Ōng. Nàmó bāgéwǎdì. Ābāluōmìdá. Āyōulī ānà. Sūbìnǐ. Shízhídá. Diézuǒ luōzǎi yě. Dátǎgědá yě. Āluōhēdì. Sānyào sānbùdá yě. Dánǐyětǎ. Ōng. Sàlībā. Sāngsīgélī. Bālīshùdá. Dáluōmǎdì. Gěgěnà. Sāngmǎwù gědì. Shābāwǎ bǐshùdì. Mǎhē nàyě. Bālīwǎlī suōhē.
Wade-Giles	An. Na-mo pa-ko-wa-ti. A-pa-lo-mi-ta. A-yu-li a-na. Su-pi-ni. Shih-chih-ta. Tieh-tso. lo-tsai yeh. Ta-t'a-ko-ta yeh. A-lo-ho-ti. San-yao san-pu-ta yeh. Tan-ni-yeh-t'a. Sa-li-pa. Sang-ssu-ko-li. Pa-li-shu-ta. Ta-lo-ma-ti. Ko-ke-na. Sang-ma-wu ko-ti. Sha-pa-wa pi-shu-ti. Ma-ho na-yeh. Pa-li-wa-li so-ho.
Vietnamese	Án, nại ma ba cát ngỏa đế, a ba ra mật đạp, a ưu rị a nạp, tô tất nể, thiệt chấp đạt, điệp tá ra tể dã, đát tháp cả đạt dã, a ra ha đế, tam dược tam bất đạt dã, đát nể dã tháp. Án, tát rị ba, tang tư cát rị, bót rị thuật đạp, đạt ra mã đế, cả cả nại, tang mã ngột cả đế, ta ba ngỏa, tỷ thuật đế, mã hắt nại dã, bát rị ngỏa rị tá hắt.
English	Adoration to the Honourable, Highest(pari)-Infinite(amita)-life(ayus)- insight(jnna) -decisive-light(tejo)-king(raja), Exalted-one (Tathagata, thus come), perfect disciple (Arahat), completely, perfectly enlightened one (Samyak-sambuddha). Like this: Om! all (sarva) righteous behaviour are in highest purity, reality of phenomena enters into emptiness, intrinsic nature are completely purified. Family of Great School have auspiciously completed.

=== Bhaiṣajyaguru Vaiḍūrya Prabhasa Tathāgatā Abhisecani Dhāraṇī ===
Bhaiṣajyaguru Vaiḍūrya Prabhasa Tathāgatā Abhisecani Dhāraṇī (Chinese: 藥師灌頂真言, Pinyin: Yàoshī Guàndǐng Zhēnyán; associated with Bhaiṣajyaguru):

Language and Romanization	Transcriptions and Translation
Sanskrit	Namo Bhagavate Bhaiṣajya-guru-vaiḍūrya-prabha-rājāya Tathāgatāya Arhate Samyak-saṃbuddhāya. Tadyathā: OṂ BHAIṢAJYE, BHAIṢAJYE, BHAIṢAJYA-SAMUD-GATE SVĀHĀ
Traditional Chinese	南無薄伽伐帝。鞞殺社。窶嚕薜琉璃。 鉢喇婆。喝囉闍也。怛他揭多也。阿囉喝帝。三藐三勃陀耶。怛姪他。唵。鞞殺逝。鞞殺逝。鞞薩社。三沒揭帝。莎訶。
Pinyin	Námó bóqiéfádì. Píshāshè. Jùlū bìliúlí. Bōlǎpó. Hèlàshé yě. Dátuōjiēduō yē. Ēlàhèdì. Sānmiǎosānbótuó yē. Dázhítuō. Ān. Píshāshì. Píshāshì. Píshāshè. Sānmòjiēdì. Suōhē.
Wade-Giles	Na-mo po-ch'ieh-fa-ti. P'i-sha-she. Chü-lu pi-liu-li. Po-la-p'o. Ho-la-she yeh. Ta-t'o-chieh-to yeh. E-la-ho-ti. San-miao-san-po-t'o yeh. Ta-chih-t`o. An. P'i-sha-shih. P'i-sha-shih. P'i-sha-she. San-mo-chieh-ti. So-ho.
Vietnamese	Nam mô bạt già phạt đế, bệ sát xả, lũ rô thích lưu ly, bát lặt bà, hắc ra xà dã, đát tha yết đa da, a ra hắc đế, tam miệu tam bột đà da. Đát điệt tha. Án, bệ sát thệ, bệ sát thệ, bệ sát xả, tam một yết đế tóa ha.
English	Give Praise to Honorable Medicine-teacher lapis-light-king, the Exalted One, The perfected disciple, Perfectly Self-Awakened One! Like this: "Auspicious one! on medicine, on medicine, the medicine appears, so be it!"

=== Āryavalokiteśvarā Bodhisattva Vikurvana Dhāraṇī ===
Āryavalokiteśvarā Bodhisattva Vikurvana Dhāraṇī (Chinese: 觀音靈感真言, Pinyin: Guānyīn Línggǎn Zhēnyán; The True Words to Bring a Response From Guanyin); contains the Oṃ maṇi padme hūm̐ mantra:

Language and Romanization	Transcriptions and Translation
Sanskrit	Oṃ maṇi padme hūṃ mahā niryāṇa cittotpāda cittakṣana vitarka sarvārtha bhūri siddha kāma pūrṇa bhūri dyototpanna Namaḥ lokeśvarāya svāhā
Traditional Chinese	唵嘛呢叭彌吽。麻曷倪牙納。積都特巴達。積特些納。微達哩葛。薩而斡而塔。卜哩悉塔葛。納補囉納。納卜哩。丟忒班納。捺麻嚧吉。說囉耶莎訶。
Pinyin	Ōng maní bāmí hōng. Máhé níyánà. Jīdōutè bādá. Jītè xiēnà. Wēidálīgé. Sàérwòértǎ. Bolī xītǎgé. Nà bǔluōnà. Nàbolī. Diūtè bānnà. Nàmá lújí. Shuōluōyé shāhē.
Wade-Giles	An ma-ni pa-mi hung. Ma-ho ni-ya-na. Chi-tou-t'e pa-ta. Chi-t'e hsieh-na. Wei-ta-li-ko. Sa-erh-wo-erh-t'a. Po-li hsi-t'a-ko. Na pu-lo-na. Na-po-li. Tiu-t'e pan-na. Na-ma lu-chi. Shuo-lo-yeh sha-ho.
Vietnamese	Án ma ni bát di hồng, ma hắt nghê nha nạp, tích đô đặt ba đạt, tích đặt ta nạp, vi đạt rị cát, tát nhi cáng nhi tháp, bốc rị tất tháp cát nạp, bổ ra nạp, nạp bốc rị, thưu thất ban nạp, nại ma lô kiết, thuyết ra da, tóa ha.
English	Oṃ maṇi padme hūṃ. Determined to leave greatly (the passions and delusions). Constant thought of reflection. All truths are greatly accomplished (siddha) according to every (pūrṇa) desire (kāma). Manifestation (utpannā) of great (bhūri) luminosity (dyota). Adoration to the Lord (iśvara) of the world. Well said (su+aha)!

=== The Blame-Dispersing Words of the Seven Buddhas of the Past ===
Sapta Atītabuddha Karshaṇīya Dhāraṇī (Chinese: 七佛滅罪真言, Pinyin: Qīfó Mièzuì Zhēnyán; associated with The Seven Buddhas of Antiquity):

Language and Romanization	Transcriptions and Translation
Sanskrit	Deva devate, cyu ha cyu hate, dhara dhṛte, nirhṛte, vimalate svāhā.
Traditional Chinese	離婆離婆帝。求訶求訶帝。陀羅尼帝。尼訶囉帝。毗黎你帝。摩訶伽帝。真陵幹帝。莎婆訶。
Pinyin	Lípó lípó dì. Qiúhē qiúhē dì. Tuóluóní dì. Níhēluō dì. Pílínǐ dì. Móhē jiādì. Zhēnlínggàn dì. Shāpóhē.
Wade-Giles	Li-p'o li-p'o ti. Ch'iu-ho ch'iu-ho ti. T'o-lo-ni ti. Ni-ho-lo ti. P'i-lin ti. Mo-ho chia-ti. Chen-ling-kan ti. Sha-p'o-ho.
Vietnamese	Ly bà ly bà đế, cầu ha cầu ha đế, đà ra ni đế, ni ha ra đế, tỳ lê nễ đế, ma ha dà đế, chơn lăng càn đế, ta bà ha.
English	Calling, calling out! Revealing, Revealing all! Making heartfelt prayers! Dissolving, disappearing blame! Vanishing vanished blame! Eminent virtues appear, and all blame is truly buried and gone by this power, svaha!

=== Sukhāvatī-vyūha Dhāraṇī ===
Sukhāvatī-vyūha Dhāraṇī (Chinese: 往生淨土神咒, Pinyin: Wǎngshēng Jìngtǔ Shénzhòu; associated with Amitabha and his Pure Land of Sukhāvatī):

Language and Romanization	Transcriptions and Translation
Sanskrit	Namo Amitābhāya Tathāgatāya. Tadyathā: Om amṛtodbhave, amṛtasiddhaṃ bhave, amṛta vikrānte, amṛta vikrāntagāmine, gagana kīrtikarī svāhā.
Traditional Chinese	南無阿彌多婆夜。哆他伽多夜。哆地夜他。阿彌利。都婆毗。阿彌唎哆。悉耽婆毗。阿彌唎多。毗迦蘭帝。阿彌唎哆。毗迦蘭多。伽彌膩。伽伽那。枳多迦利。娑婆訶。
Pinyin	Námó ēmíduōpó yè. Duōtāqíeduō yè. Duōdìyètā. Ēmílì. Dōupópí. Ēmílìduō. Xīdān pópí. Ēmílìduō. Píjiālándì. Ēmílìduō. Píjiālánduō. Qíemínì. Qíeqíenuó. Zhǐduō jiālì. Suōpóhē.
Wade-Giles	Na-mo e-mi-to-p'o yeh. To-t'a-ch'ie-to yeh. To-ti-yeh-t'a. E-mi-li. Tou-p'o-p'i. E-mi-li-to. Hsi-tan p'o-p'i. E-mi-li-to. P'i-chia-lan-ti. E-mi-li-to. P'i-chia-lan-to. Ch'ie-mi-ni. Ch'ie-ch'ie-no. Chih-to chia-li. So-p'o-ho.
Vietnamese	Nam mô a di đa bà dạ. Đa tha dà đa dạ. Đa điệt dạ tha. A di rị đô bà tỳ, a di rị đa, tất đam bà tỳ, a di rị đa, tỳ ca lan đế, a di rị đa, tỳ ca lan đa, dà di nị dà dà na. Chỉ đa ca lệ, ta bà ha.
English	Adoration to the Perfect One of Infinite Light, namely: Nectar-producing one! Nectar-creation-perfecting one! Nectar-miracle one! (One) performs miracle with nectar, he makes (nectar) to pervade as widely as sky, All Hail!

=== Shrīdevī Dhāraṇī ===
Shrīdevī Dhāraṇī (Chinese: 大吉祥天女咒, Pinyin: Dà Jíxiáng Tiānnǚ Zhòu; associated with Śrīmahādevī):

Language and Romanization	Transcriptions and Translation
Sanskrit	Namo buddhāya, namo dharmāya, namaḥ saṃghāya, namo śrīmahādevīya. Tadyathā: Oṃ paripūrṇacare, samantadarśane, mahāvihāragate, samantavidhāmane mahākāryapratiṣṭhāne, sarvārthasādhane supratipūri, āyānadharmatā mahā-avikopite mahāmaitrī-upasaṃhite, mahākleśe susaṃgṛhīte, samantārthānupālane svāhā.
Traditional Chinese	南無佛陀。南無達摩。南無僧伽。南無室利。摩訶提鼻耶。怛你也他。波利富樓那。遮利三曼陀。達舍尼。摩訶毗訶羅伽帝。三曼陀。毘尼伽帝。摩訶迦利野。波祢。波囉。波祢。薩利縛栗他。三曼陀。修缽黎帝。富隸那。阿利那。達摩帝。摩訶毗鼓畢帝。摩訶彌勒帝。婁簸僧只帝。醯帝簁。僧只醯帝。三曼陀。阿他阿 [少/免] 。婆羅尼。娑婆訶
Pinyin	Námó fótuó. Námó dámó. Námó sēngjiā. Námó shìlì. Móhē tíbí yé. Dánǐyětā. Bōlì fùlóunà. Zhēlì sānmàntuó. Dáshění. Móhē píhēluó jiādì. Sānmàntuó. Píní jiādì. Móhē jiālì yě. Bō mí. Bō luō. Bō mí. Sàlì fùlìtā. Sānmàntuó. Xiūbōlí dì. Fùlìnà. Ālìnà. Dámódì. Móhē pígǔbì dì. Móhē mílè dì. Lóubǒ sēngzhǐ dì. Xīdìshāi. Sēngzhǐ xīdì. Sānmàntuó. Ā tā ā [shǎo/miǎn]. Póluóní. Suōpóhē.
Wade-Giles	Na-mo fo-t'o. Na-mo ta-mo. Na-mo seng-chia. Na-mo shih-li. Mo-ho t'i-pi yeh. Ta-ni-yeh-t'a. Po-li fu-lou-na. Che-li san-man-t'o. Ta-shen-ni. Mo-ho p'i-ho-lo chia-ti. San-man-t'o. P'i-ni chia-ti. Mo-ho chia-li yeh. Po mi. Po lo. Po mi. Sa-li fu-li-t'a. San-man-t'o. Hsiu-po-li ti. Fu-li-na. A-li-na. Ta-mo-ti. Mo-ho p'i-ku-pi ti. Mo-ho mi-le ti. Lou-po seng-chih ti. Hsi-ti-shai. Seng-chih hsi-ti. San-man-t'o. A t'a a [shao/mien]. P'o-lo-ni so-p'o-ho.
Vietnamese	Nam mô Phật-đà. Nam mô Đạt-ma. Nam mô Tăng-già. Nam mô thất lỵ, ma ha để tỷ da, đát nể dã tha, ba lỵ phú lầu na giá lỵ, tam mạn đà, bạt xá ni, ma ha tỳ ha ra dà đế, tam mạn đà, tỳ ni dà đế, ma ha ca rị dã, ba nể ba ra, ba nể tát rị phạ lặt tha, tam mạn đà, tu bác lê đế, phú lệ na, a rị na, đạt mạ đế, ma ha tỳ cổ tất đế, ma ha Di Lặc đế, lâu phả tăng kỳ đế, hê đế tỷ, tăng kỳ hê đế, tam mạn đà, a tha a nậu, đà la ni.
English	Adoration to the Buddha, adoration to the Buddhist teaching, adoration to the Buddhist community, adoration to the great auspicious goddess! Like this: Oṃ (She) completes (pūrṇa) the deed (ka're, kama) successively (pari), all good to be seen, abides in great position, understands (mana) all good knowledge stays peaceably in great practice (caryā), in procuring (sādhane) all truths perfectly, and approaching great indestructible nature benefits (all) with great compassion, manages the great defilements, supports the welfare (of all), All Hail!

== See also ==
- Śūraṅgama Mantra
- Nīlakaṇṭha Dhāraṇī
- Oṃ maṇi padme hūm̐
