= Mantra of Light =

Mantra in East Asian Buddhism

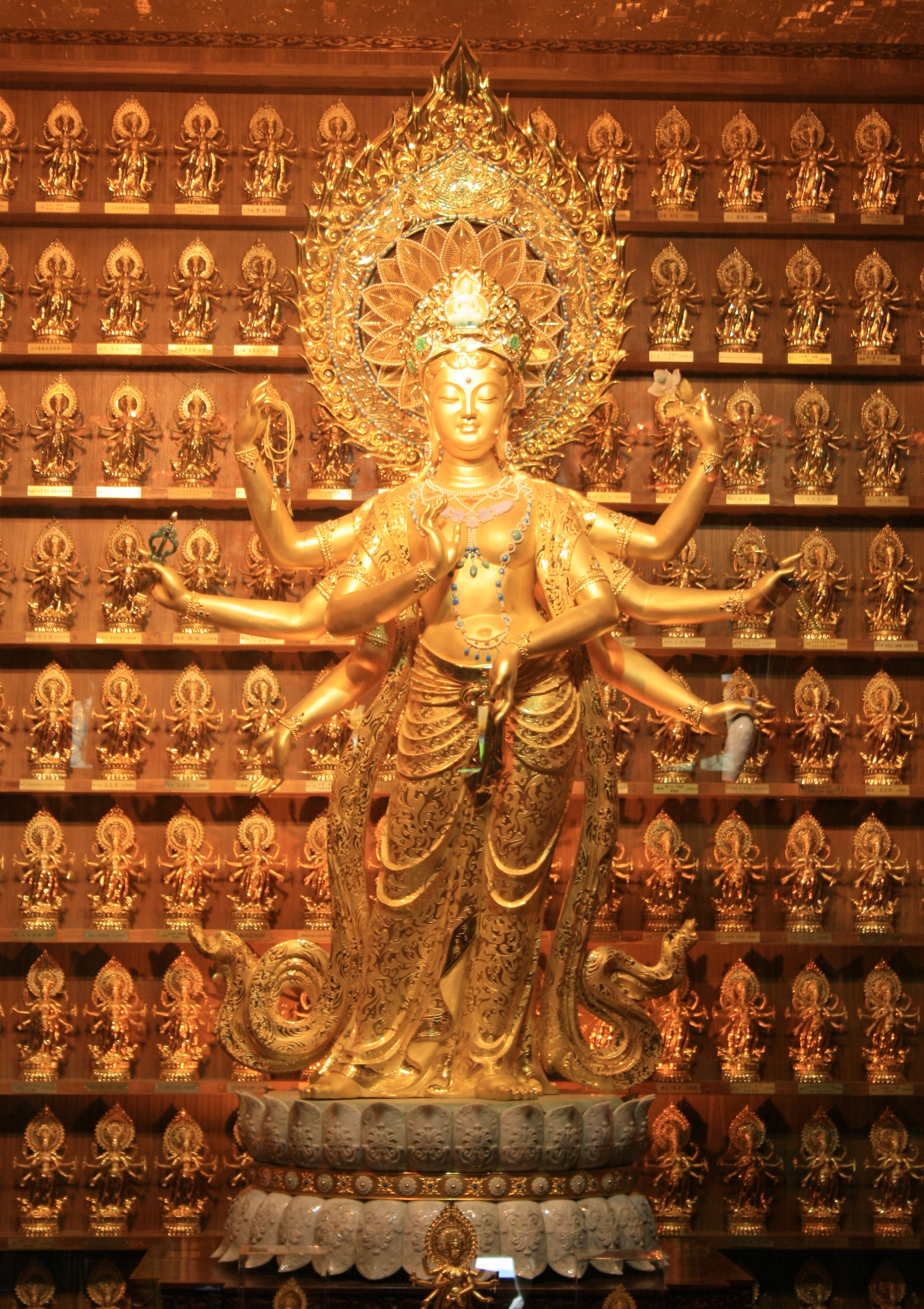
A statue of Amoghapāśa Lokeśvara at Nanshan, China.

The Mantra of Light, alternatively (光明真言, pinyin: guāngmíng zhēnyán, rōmaji: kōmyō shingon; Sanskrit: prabhāsa-mantra), alternatively (毗盧遮那如來所說不空大灌頂光真言, pinyin: pílúzhēnà rúlái ruǒshuō bukōng dà guàndǐng guāng zhēnyán) is a Buddhist mantra. In both Chinese Buddhism and Japanese Buddhism, the mantra is associated with both the Buddha Vairocana as well as the Bodhisattva Amoghapāśa. The mantra also has various other names including the Mantra of the Light of Great Consecration (Ch: 大灌頂光真言), Mantra of Amoghapāśa (Unfailing Noose), Heart essence of Amoghapāśa (skt. amoghapāśahṛdaya) and Unfailing King (Amogharāja).

The mantra is found in the Amoghapāśa-kalparāja-sūtra (Chinese translation at Taisho no. 1092 and Korean Buddhist Canon no. K.287, translated by Bodhiruci) as well as in the Sutra of the Mantra of the Unfailing Rope Snare of the Buddha Vairocana's Great Baptism (不空羂索毘盧遮那佛大灌頂光真言一卷, Taisho no. 1002) and is associated with both the Buddha Vairocana and the deity Amoghapāśa (lit. "Unfailing Rope"), a form of Avalokiteshvara. It is also the mantra associated with the consecration (abhiseka) of Amoghapāśa by myriad Buddhas (hence its name as "mantra for the mudrā consecration" in the Tibetan version of the text).

== Mantra ==
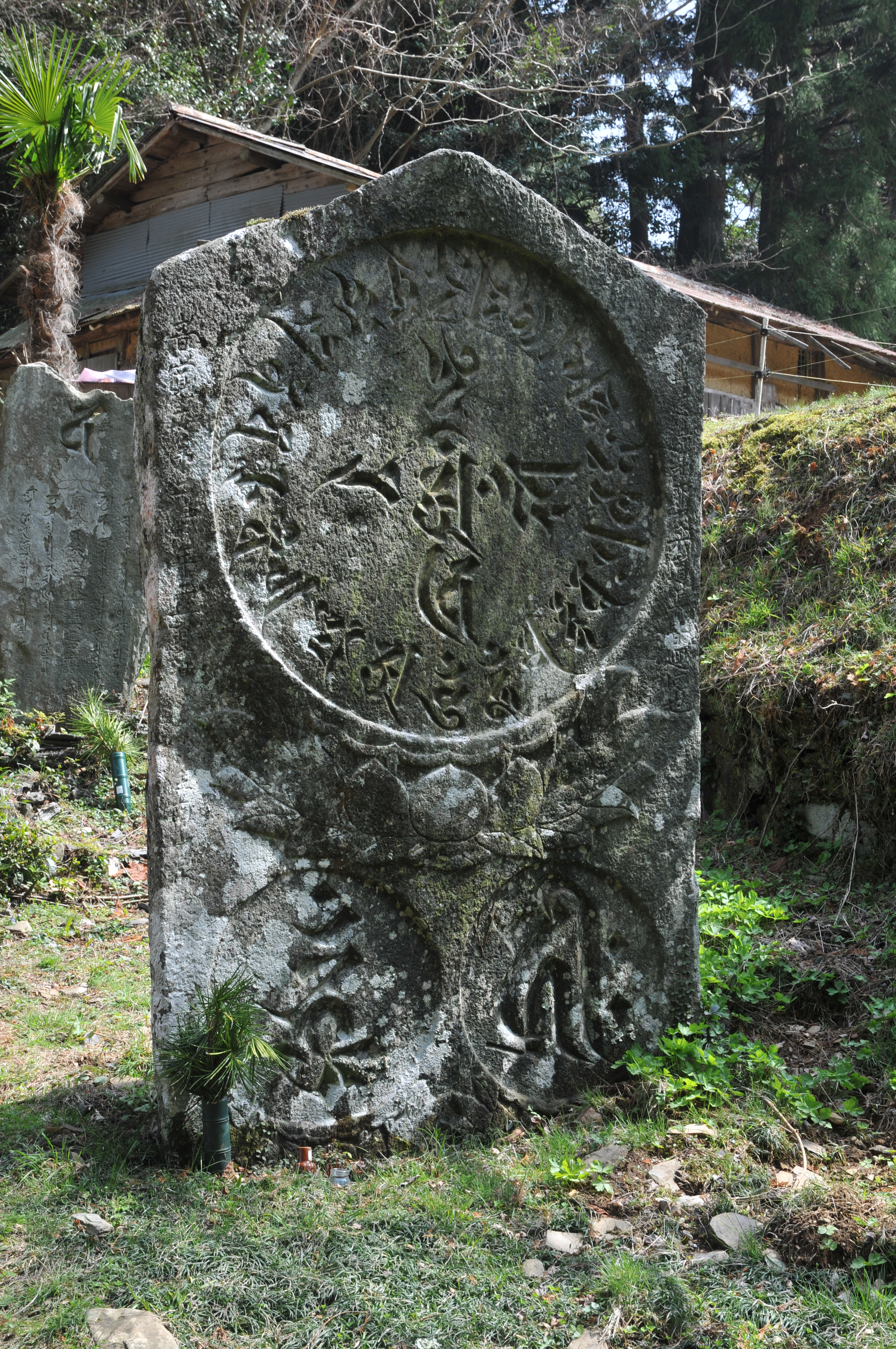
Stone stele of the Mantra of Light, Niutsuhime-jinja, Japan.

The "mantra of light" is the following:

Sanskrit

- Roman Script: oṃ amogha-vairocana mahāmudrā maṇi-padme-jvala pravartaya hūṃ
- Siddhaṃ: 𑖌𑖼 𑖀𑖦𑖺𑖑𑖪𑖹𑖨𑖺𑖓𑖡𑖦𑖮𑖯𑖦𑖲𑖟𑖿𑖨𑖯𑖦𑖜𑖰𑖢𑖟𑖿𑖦𑖸 𑖕𑖿𑖪𑖩 𑖢𑖿𑖨𑖪𑖨𑖿𑖝𑖧 𑖮𑖳𑖽𑗃
- Devanagari: ॐ अमोघवैरोचनमहामुद्रामणिपद्मे ज्वल प्रवर्तय हूँ
- Sanskrit Pronunciation

Chinese scripts

- Transliteration version 1:
  - 唵 阿謨伽 尾盧左曩 摩訶母捺囉 麽抳 鉢納麽 入嚩攞 鉢囉韈哆野 吽
  - Ōng āmójiā wěilúzuǒnǎng móhēmǔnàluō mónǐ bōnàme rùwáluó bōluōwàduōyě hōng
- Transliteration version 2:
  - 唵 㫊暮伽 廢嚕者娜 摩訶畝陀囉 麼抳 鉢頭麼 入縛攞 跛囉韈嚲野 吽
  - Ōng āmùjiā fèilǔzhěnà móhēmǔtuóluō mónǐ bōtóumó rùfúluó bǒluōwàduǒyě hōng
- Transliteration version 3:
  - 唵 阿穆伽 吠嚕遮那 摩訶謨囊羅 摩尼 缽頭摩 入嚩羅 波羅嚩怛彌啞吽
  - Ōng āmùjiā fèilǔzhēnà móhēmónángluó móní bōtóumó rùwáluó bōluówádámíyǎ hōng

Japanese

- おん あぼきゃ べいろしゃのう まかぼだら まに はんどま じんばら はらばりたや うん
- Romanized: On abokya beiroshanō makabodara mani handoma jinbara harabaritaya un

Korean

- 옴 아모가 바이로차나 마하무드라 마니 파드마 즈바라 프라바릍타야 훔
- Romanized: om amoga bairochana mahamudeura mani padeuma jeubara peurabareutaya hum

Vietnamese

- Án (Ông/Úm) a mộ già vĩ lô tả nẵng, ma ha mẫu nại ra, mạ nĩ bát nạp mạ nhập phạ ra, nhập phạ ra, bát ra mạt đa dã hồng.

Tibetan

- ཨོཾ་ཨ་མོ་གྷ་བཻ་རོ་ཙ་ན་མ་ཧཱ་མུ་དྲཱ་མ་ཎི་པདྨ་ཛྭ་ལ་པྲ་ཝརྟཱ་ཡ་ཧཱུྃ

=== Translation ===
The translation of this mantra, according to Professor Mark Unno, is roughly:

Praise be to the flawless, all-pervasive illumination of the great mudra [or seal of the Buddha ]. Turn over to me the jewel, lotus and radiant light.

Another translation according to the Dharmachakra Translation Committee is:

"Oṁ, amogha [infallible] jewel-lotus [maṇipadma] of the splendorous great mudrā! Blaze! Set in motion! Hūṁ!"

== Amoghapāśa sūtras ==
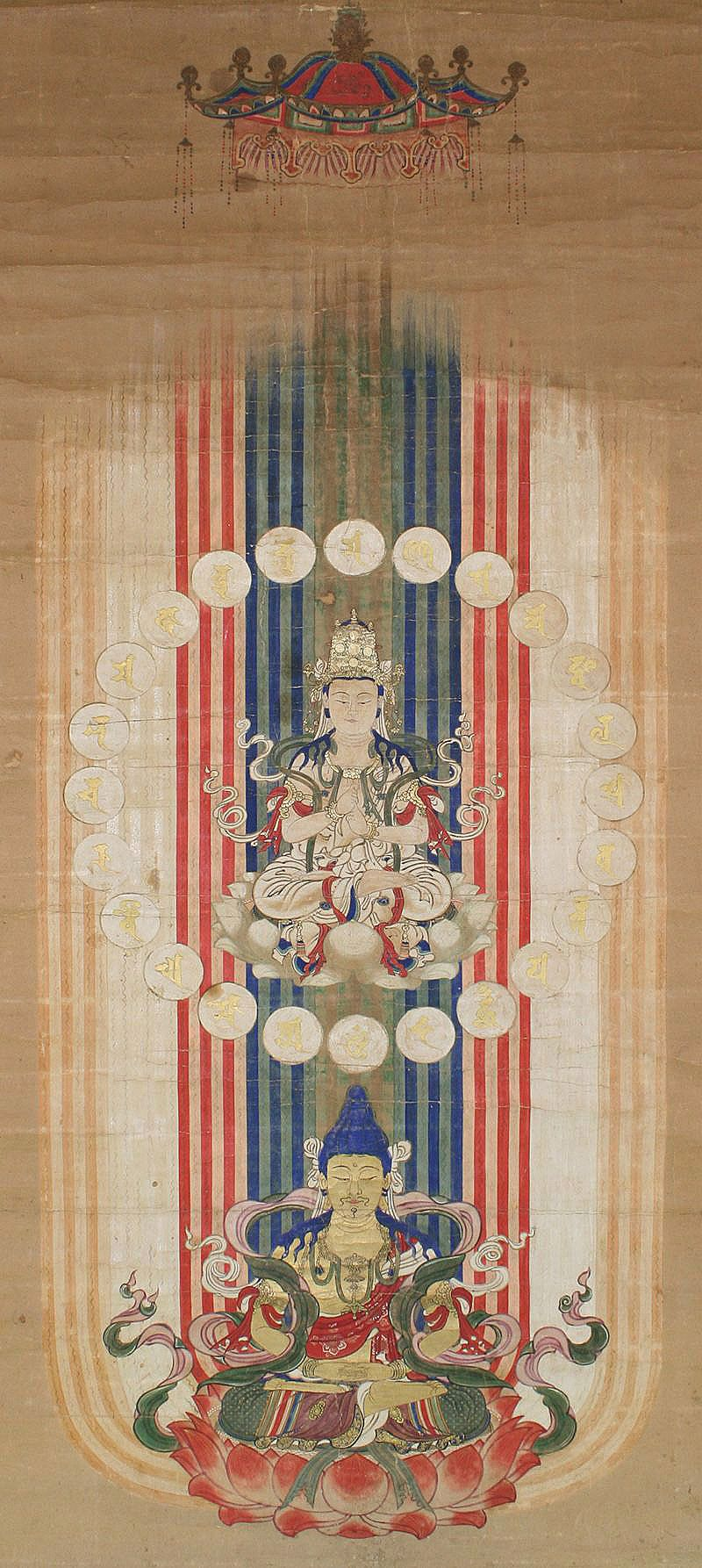
Japanese Light Mantra Mandala, Edo period, approximately 17th-18th century.

The mantra appears in various Mahayana sutras related to the deity Amoghapāśa. These include several short sutras which contain the mantra and basic instructions for its use (found in Chinese at Taisho no. 1092 and in Tibetan at Toh 682), and a much longer ritual manual called Amoghapāśakalparāja (Toh 686, tib. ’phags pa don yod pa’i zhags pa’i cho ga zhib mo’i rgyal po) which contains the shorter sutra in the first chapter along with extensive later chapters.

The shorter Amoghapāśa sutras include:

- Amoghapāśa-dhāraṇī-sūtra (Bukong juansuo zhou jing 不空胃索咒經, Taishō 1093), translated into Chinese by Jñānagupta in 587.
- Amoghapāśahṛdayasūtra, by Xuanzang in 659 (Taishō 1094).
- Amoghapāśahṛdayasūtra by Bodhiruci in 693 (Taishō 1095),
- Amoghapāśa-dhāraṇī-sūtra by Dānapāla in the tenth century (Taishō 1099),
- Bukong juansuo shenbian zhenyan jing (不空胃索神變真吉經, Amoghapāśa Supernatural Display Mantra Sūtra, Taishō 1092) translated by Bodhiruci in 707–9, this is a larger edition of the work.
- Āryāmoghapāśahṛdayanāmamahāyānasūtra (Toh 682), a Tibetan edition which comprises a different edition of part 1 of the longer Amoghapāśakalparāja

Regarding the longer Amoghapāśakalparāja (Toh 686), which also exists in a Sanskrit manuscript, modern scholars consider it to be a collection of various ritual manuals related to Amoghapāśa which likely circulated independently and were later collected together.

Another text which contains the mantra is The Mantra of Light of the Empowerment of Vairocana of Amoghapāśa (Bukong juansuo piluzhenafo daguangdingguang zhenyan 不空羂索毘盧遮那佛大灌頂光眞言, Taisho no. 1002) which was translated by the Patriarch of Chinese Esoteric Buddhism, Amoghavajra (705–774), during the Tang dynasty.

In the shorter Chinese editions of the sutra, the mantra is used as a salvific mantra that can help deceased beings attain birth in the Pure Land of Amitabha as well as heal diseases.

In the Amoghapāśakalparāja, the heart dhāraṇī / mantra is called "Amogharāja" (Amogha King), the “heart essence of Amoghapāśa” (amoghapāśahṛdaya), and a "maṇḍala of liberation" (skt. vimokṣamaṇḍala, meaning any practice which is itself sufficient to produce liberation). The mantra is also used as a consecration mantra by the Buddhas of the ten directions which appear to ritually consecrate the bodhisattva Amoghapāśa (不空羂索, Unfailing Rope), a form of Avalokiteśvara who carried a rope and net (symbolizing the ability to save sentient beings and to bind the defilements). The longer compendium also contains discussions of the various emanations and dhāraṇīs of Amoghapāśa (including many short and longer dhāraṇīs other than the Mantra of Light), as well as Amoghatārā, a form of Tārā, who is the feminine consort of Amoghapāśa and also has her own dhāraṇī.

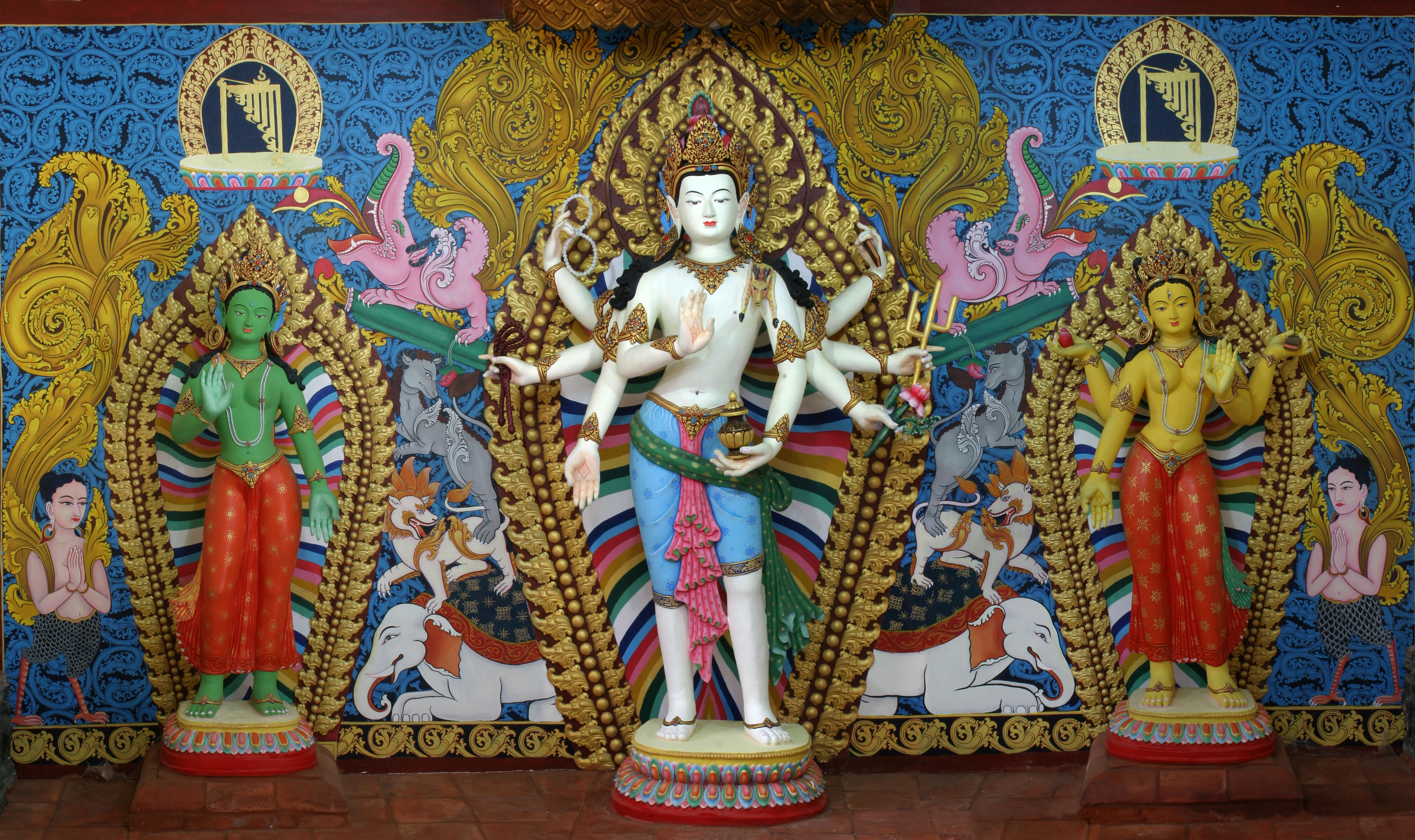
Amoghapāśa Lokesvara flanked by two Tārās, Patan, Nepal.

The popular Chinese edition of the sutra (Amoghavajra's edition) mentions how it is to be used to save even the dead and lead them to the Pure Land of Amitabha Buddha by reciting it over sand and spreading the sand on the dead:

One should empower the sand with the mystic power of the mantra by repeating it one hundred and eight times, and the sand should be sprinkled on the corpses in the charnel grounds or on the graves of the deceased one should sprinkle the sand wherever one encounters them. The deceased may be in hell, in the realm of hungry ghosts, of angry gods, or of beasts. However, they will attain the body of light according to the needs of time and circumstance by means of the mystic power of the sand of the divine power of the Mantra of Light… The karmic retribution of their sins will be eliminated, they will discard their suffering bodies, and they will go to the Western Land of Bliss. They will be re born in the lotus blossom of Amida and will not fall back until they attain bodhi.

The sutra also states that the mantra can be recited 1008 times in front of a sick person to remove the karmic obstacles of their sickness. In the Tibetan version of the larger ritual compendium (Toh 686), the passage which introduces the mantra states:

All the tathāgatas throughout the ten directions, the fully realized buddhas established throughout the three times, became clearly visible, appearing, through their magical power, to be suspended in the canopy of the sky. They applauded the blessed Tathāgata Śākyamuni: "Good! It is good, Śākyamuni! This king of consecrations is extremely difficult to obtain. The king of vidyās was also consecrated by the former tathāgatas established throughout the three times. All of us declare with a single voice that each of us will also consecrate the great king of vidyās, the Light of the Wish-Fulfilling Amogha Jewel." Subsequently, each of the tathāgatas established throughout the three times extended his golden hand and consecrated the king of vidyās by anointing his head. Each tathāgata thus bestowed the mudrā consecration upon the king of vidyās. The mantra for the mudrā consecration is: "Oṁ, amogha jewel-lotus of the splendorous great mudrā! Blaze! Set in motion! Hūṁ!" Immediately after bestowing the great mudrā of consecration, each tathāgata congratulated the king of vidyās and disappeared, returning to his particular buddha field.

== In East Asia ==
=== Chinese Buddhism ===
The Shuilu fahui yigui ben (水陸儀軌會本), the most popular version of the liturgy for the Shuilu Fahui ceremony where the Mantra of Light is used.

In Chinese Buddhism, one primary usage of the mantra since the Song dynasty has been in regular ritual services carried out by monastics. For instance, an early reference to the mantra is found in the Lebang wenlei (樂邦文類) by Zongxiao 's (1151–1214), which discusses how the Tiantai monk Zhiyuan 智圓 (976–1022) in the Song Dynasty (960 - 1279) used the mantra on sand to attempt to save his deceased mother. Another key example of the mantra's employment in Chinese Buddhism is found in the manual Baizhang qinggui zhengyi ji (百丈清規證義記; lit: "Baizhang’s Pure Rules for Large Chan Monasteries with Orthodox Commentary"), which is a summary of general mainstream monastic vinaya rules in Chinese Buddhist temples within China compiled during the late Qing dynasty (1644 - 1912). In the subsection detailing the ritual for celebrating Śākyamuni Buddha's Birthday (釋迦佛誕; Shìjiā Fó dàn), the manual states that the ritual's participants should chant the Mantra of Light seven times in front of a statue of the infant Buddha before bathing the statue of the Buddha with water (浴佛 Yùfó).

Most notably, the mantra is commonly used during the Shuilu Fahui ceremony (水陸法會), an elaborate, multi-day ritual that was first compiled during the Northern and Southern dynasties period and subsequently further extended during the Song, Ming and Qing dynasties. During the Shuilu Fahui ceremony, all enlightened and unenlightened beings in saṃsāra are invoked and invited to attend and partake in the physical and spiritual nourishment provided. In the most widely used version of the liturgy for the ceremony, the Shuilu fahui yigui ben (水陸儀軌會本), the Mantra of Light is recited seven times in succession by the officiating monastics while setting up the inner altar during a specific subsection where Vairocana is invoked into the ritual space. The specific transliteration of the mantra used in the Shuilu fahui yigui ben is transliteration version 2 in the Mantra section above. Today, the mantra and the liturgy remains in use during Shuilu Fahui ceremonies, which continues to be one of the most popular Chinese Buddhist rituals in contemporary times.

In addition, the mantra is also traditionally grouped as one of the "Four Great Blessings" (四大祝延) or "Praises of Blessings" (祝延讚), which is a quartet of mantras and prayers consisting of the Mantra of Light, the "Oṃ maṇi padme hūm̐" mantra, the Dhāraṇī of the Holy Tathāgata of Immeasurable Lifespan, King of Determined Radiance as well as a prayer for the health and longevity of the emperor (which has been updated in modern times to pray for the people instead). When considered within this grouping, the Mantra of Light is usually referred to by its first few syllables "Ong Amujia" (唵 阿穆伽), and its transliteration in most common Chinese liturgical texts such as the Chanmen Risong (禪門日誦; lit: "Daily Recitations of the Chan Gate") and the Fomen Bibei (佛門必備, lit: "Essentials of the Buddhist Gate") is transliteration version 3 in the Mantra section above, with only minor differences between texts. In modern times, the "Four Great Blessings", inclusive of the Mantra of Light, continue to be recited by monastics during events such as the Buddha's birthday and during retreats.

In the early 20th century, the mantra's usage further spread beyond monastic rituals to lay practice, mainly due to the efforts of Wang Hongyuan 王弘願 (1876–1937). Hongyuan learned the use of the mantra from Shingon Buddhists and compiled texts on its use, promoting the practice among his lay followers. His ritual manual called A Study on the Mantra of Light (光明真言之研究; Guāngmíng zhēnyán zhī yánjiū) was distributed among his lay followers as a guide to the mantra. Hongyuan's work led to a new form of modern Chinese Pure Land devotion for laypeople which blends Pure Land practice with elements of Chinese Esoteric Buddhism.

=== Japanese Buddhism ===
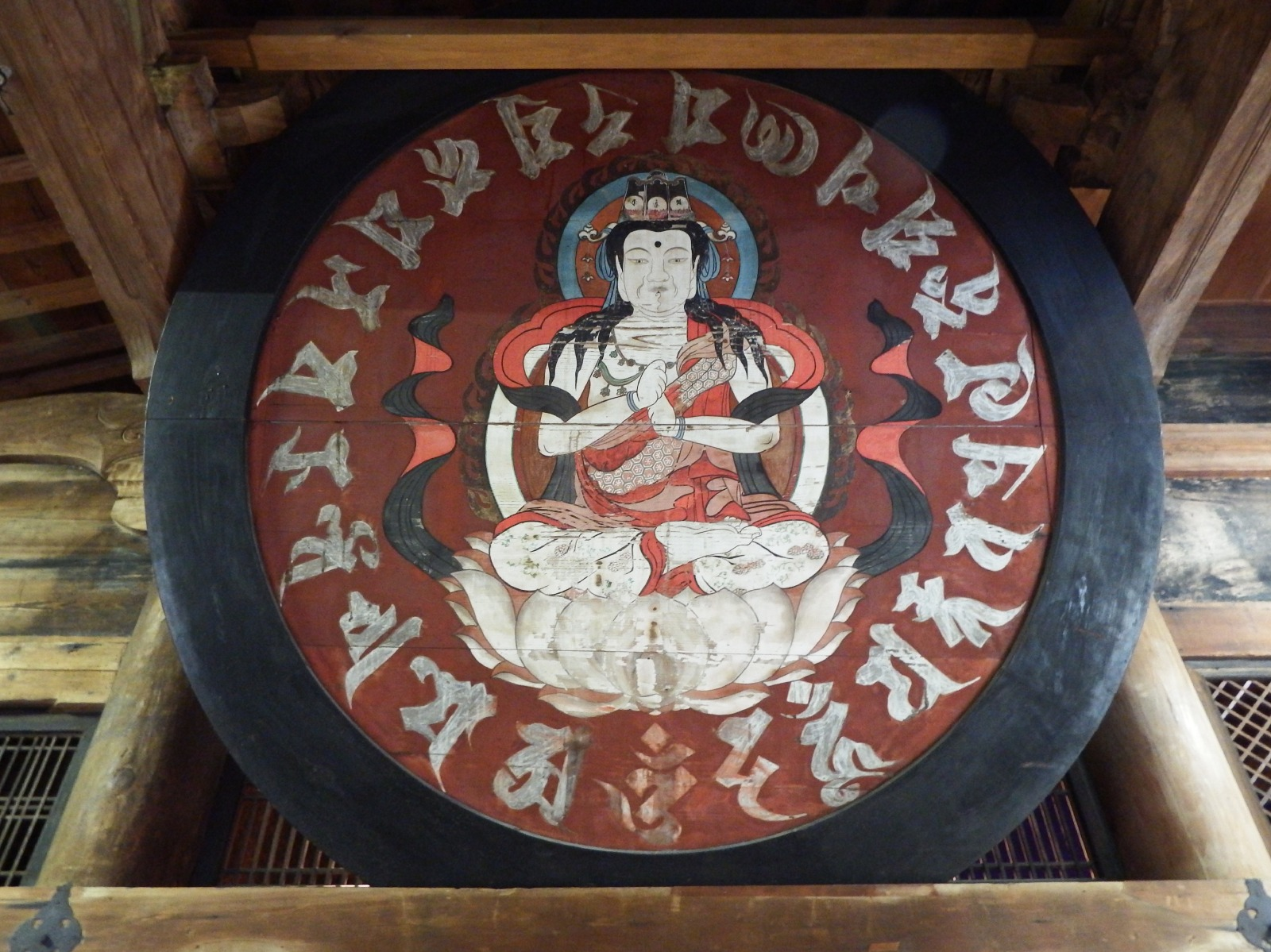
Wooden Panel Mandala of the Mantra of Light, Tosa Kokubun-ji (土佐国分寺), a Shingon temple in Nankoku, Kōchi, Shikoku.

Although Kukai brought a copy of Amoghavajra's sutra to Japan in the 9th century, there are no records that he ever utilized it in tantric practices. Records show gradually increasing use in the Heian Period (794–1185). Some of the earliest reports of the regular use of the mantra come from 10th century Tendai societies on Mount Hiei, specifically that of the Twenty-Five Samādhi Assembly (二十五三昧会; Nijūgo zanmai e), which included the monk Genshin and focused on birth in Amitābha's pure land.

In the 13th century, the Mantra of Light was widely popularized by the monk Myōe (1173–1232), and later by Shingon monks Eison and Ninshō in their ministries. Myōe famously taught the Mantra of Light as a way to purify bad karma and to achieve birth in Sukhavati (or other pure lands if one wished), seeing it as an alternative to the nembutsu. He even wrote a work on it, Recommending Faith in the Sand of the Mantra of Light (光明真言土砂勸信記; Kōmyō shingon dosha kanjinki). He recommended the mantra widely to his followers, especially to laypersons.

Myōe came to see the Mantra of Light as "the mother of all mantras, most excellent among the miraculous teachings of Dharma granted by the Tathagata Vairocana". He tended to focus on the motif of the mantra's power of transformation, especially its ability to convert sand or dirt (with its associations with impurity) into something sacred and pure. According to Myōe:

If there are sentient beings who hear it chanted for twice, three times, or just seven times, all sorts of obstructions resulting from their past karma will immediately be eradicated. At the end of their lives, they will never attain rebirth in evil realms. Chant this mantra for 108 times and empower dirt and sand, and sprinkle them over corpses lying on burial grounds or on graves. The dirt and sand are now penetrated with the all permeating, all unfailing, miraculous force of Vairocana's radiance by means of which [the Buddha] incessantly works to initiate beings into his secret teaching of reality. With the power of the dirt and sand, all the deceased sprinkled with them— whether they had been reborn in the evil reams of hell, hungry ghosts, fighting demons, or animals — will immediately receive Vairocana's light, abandon their bodies of suffering composed of past evil acts, and attain rebirth in the western pure land of extreme bliss. ... If there are beings who suffer for many years from frailty, illness, and all sorts of pain, these are caused by evil acts they committed in their previous lives. Recite this mantra before the sick for 1,080 times a day, repeat it for two days or three days. It will immediately cure the illness by removing evil karma accumulated through past lives.

Eison (1201–1290) is known for convening "Mantra of Light Assemblies" at Saidaiji, which were joined by male and female monastics and laypersons who took the eight precepts for seven days and recited the Mantra of Light.

Both the Mantra and the nembutsu were often incorporated by medieval Buddhists at one time or another, often in the same service. A common practice for the Mantra of Light was to sprinkle pure sand, blessed with this mantra, on the body of a deceased person or their tomb, based on teachings expounded in the Sutra. The belief was that a person who had accumulated much bad karma, and possible rebirth in Hell would be immediately freed and allowed a favorable rebirth into the Pure Land of Amitabha Buddha. This practice is known as dosha-kaji (土砂加持) in Japanese.

Today, the mantra remains one of the most popular mantras in Shingon Buddhism and is also used in Tendai, Zen and Kegon liturgy.

== See also ==
- Nianfo
- Namu Myōhō Renge Kyō
- Om mani padme hum
- Nīlakaṇṭha Dhāraṇī
- Śūraṅgama mantra
- Ten Small Mantras
