= Amitabha Pure Land Rebirth Dharani =

Mantra in Pure Land Buddhism

The Amitabha Pure Land Rebirth Dhāraṇī, sometimes called the Rebirth Mantra (Chinese: 往生咒; Wǎngshēng zhòu) for short, is an important dhāraṇī in East Asian Buddhism, especially for Pure Land practice. The full name is: Dhāraṇī for Pulling Out the Root Causes of Karmic Obstacles and Obtaining Rebirth in the Pure Land (Chinese: 拔一切業障根本得生淨土陀羅尼). It is also known as Pure Land Rebirth Dhāraṇī (Chinese: 往生淨土神咒; Wang Sheng Jing Tu Shen Zhou).

The title itself encapsulates the dual function of the incantation: the "uprooting of the roots of all karmic obstacles" and "attaining rebirth in the Pure Land". This dhāraṇī is often associated with the Amitābhā sūtra and with Nagarjuna.

In East Asian Buddhism, reciting this dhāraṇī is believed to grant the reciter a peaceful and joyful life, and allow them to be reborn into the Buddha Amitabha's buddha-field of Ultimate Bliss, as well as to have a vision of Buddha Amitabha. It can also be recited to help the spirits of the animals that a person has killed in the past, including poultry, game, aquatic creatures, insects, etc. to ascend to a higher spiritual realm.

== Overview ==
According to Chinese tradition, the Pure Land Rebirth Dhāraṇī was transmitted and transliterated by Guṇabhadra (Sanskrit; Chinese: 求那跋陀羅, 394–468) and by Narendrayasas (490–589). It was popularized by a certain Dharma Master Xiu of Tianping Monastery in the Northern Qi (550–577) capital of Ye (Hebei). The dhāraṇī was reproduced individually or appended to the end of the Amitābha Sūtra in some editions of the Chinese Buddhist Canon.

Chinese tradition associates the dhāraṇī with bodhisattva Nagarjuna, who is said to have received the dhāraṇī from Amitabha Buddha in a dream. Traditionally, Nagarjuna is also believed to have attained birth in the Pure Land through this dhāraṇī. The dhāraṇī may have been practiced by Pure Land patriarchs like Lushan Huiyuan, and it was also popularized by Amoghavajra at the Tang court.

According to two texts (possibly from the Six dynasties period), one should bathe and clean one's mouth, light incense before a Buddha image, kneel with palms together and recite the dhāraṇī thirty seven times. This is to be repeated for the six periods of day and night. While the dhāraṇī's name indicates that its main function is rebirth in the pure land of Sukhavati, reciting the dhāraṇī is also said to have many other positive benefits, such as the "pulling out the fundamental cause of karmic obstacles" and also protecting one from evil spirits and influences.

According to the dhāraṇī sutra attributed to Guṇabhadra:

If there is any good man or good woman who is able to recite this dhāraṇī, then Amitābha Buddha will constantly abide above their crown, protecting them day and night, never allowing hostile forces to find opportunity. In this present life they will constantly obtain peace and security. When the moment of death arrives, they will naturally and spontaneously attain rebirth [i.e. into the Pure Land].

This text also describes the benefits of reciting the dhāraṇī as follows:

the four grave transgressions, the five rebellious acts, the ten evil deeds, and even the sin of slandering the true Dharma—all will be eradicated. One will obtain all that one seeks in this life, and not be disturbed by malevolent spirits and demons. If one recites it up to 200,000 times, one will feel the emergence of the sprout of awakening (bodhi). If one reaches 300,000 recitations, one will behold Amitābha Buddha face to face.

Amoghavajra’s Wuliangshou rulai guanxing gongyang yigui (無量壽如來觀行供養儀軌 T. 930) contains the standard edition of the long dhāraṇī, known as the fundamental dhāraṇī of Amitāyus Tathāgata [無量壽如來根本陀羅尼]. This longer dharani appears in numerous other sources of Tang esoterica. The most common term in the dhāraṇī is the Sanskrit amṛta, which is the term for the nectar of immortality in the Ṛg Veda and symbolizes eternal life. The term is also a synonym for Amitāyus. It is also connected to the tantric Buddhist idea of great bliss (mahāsukha).

Aaron Proffit explains the benefits of the long version of the dhāraṇī according to Amoghavajra's tradition of Chinese Esoteric Buddhism as follows:

Chanting this dhāraṇī one thousand times is said to purify all past karma, bestow rebirth in the highest level of Sukhāvatī, and produce visions of Sukhāvatī, Amitāyus Buddha, and assemblies of bodhisattvas. From these honored ones, the practitioner will hear all of the sutras and, at the moment of death, attain rebirth in Sukhāvatī, emerging from a lotus blossom at the rank of a bodhisattva. At the end of life, one will certainly attain rebirth in Sukhāvatī, see the Buddha, hear the Dharma, and quickly attain the highest level of bodhi. As in some of the other texts discussed previously, this dhāraṇī text describes a seven-jeweled chariot that transports one to Sukhāvatī. The Sanskrit term amṛta appears several times in this dhāraṇī and others. In the Ṛg Veda this term refers to the elixir of eternal life. The iconography of and texts associated with Amitābha/Amitāyus often describe this buddha as one whose Dharma serves as the ambrosia that grants eternal life. This is also connected to great bliss (mahāsukha), which may refer in particular to the ultimate bliss attained through the practices found in the tantras.

In modern Chinese Buddhism, the dhāraṇī is usually recited 21, 27 or 49 times per day.

In one type of group practice, participants usually recite this dhāraṇī three times after reciting the Heart Sutra or the Amitabha Sutra.

Layman Lin Guangming wrote the extensive A Study of the Rebirth Mantra (往生咒研究 1997), which provides the most in-depth modern study of the Rebirth Mantra.

In modern Chinese Buddhism, several influential figures have taught and promoted the Rebirth Mantra (Wang Sheng Zhou). Pure Land figures such as Master Yinguang, and Master Chin Kung taught the mantra. Venerable Wu Gong and Master Hui Lü also highlighted its practical benefits in collected Dharma talks. Contemporary teachers like Venerable Ren Huan and Venerable Ci Fa have focused on the mantra’s power to remove karmic obstacles.

== Texts ==
=== Short version ===
The standard short version of the dharani which is practiced in Chinese Buddhism is the one translated by Gunabhadra and said to have been received by Nagarjuna in a dream. The IAST of the Indic text is:

Namo amitābhāya tathāgatāya | tadyathā |

amṛtodbhave | amṛta-siddhaṃbhave | amṛta-vikrānte |

amṛtavikrānta | gāmine gagana kīrtakare | svāhā ||

Alternatively, some versions replace amṛtasiddhaṃ-bhave with amṛtasaṃbhave.

English:

Homage to Amitābha ("Infinite Light") Tathagata ("He who has gone to Thusness").

Thus:

O substance of the deathless (amrita),

O born of the perfection of the deathless.

O heroic strider of deathless ambrosia.

O one who strides beyond to the deathless,

O sky goer, O fame maker, Hail!

If we go by strict classical Sanskrit rules, all the words following tadyathā (thus:) are feminine vocatives. The dhāraṇī thus consists of a name devotion to Amitabha Buddha followed by the names of the dhāraṇī itself (i.e. of the vidyā-mantra), which in Indian esoteric culture would be coded as feminine. However, the -e ending can also be used for male vocative endings in Buddhist Hybrid Sanskrit and in Western Prakrit languages, and many Buddhist dharanis are in these languages. Thus, this need not be read as classical Sanskrit. If the gender of the words in the mantra are male, then they could just be other names for Amitabha Buddha.

==== From the Tibetan Canon ====
The Tibetan Buddhist Canon also includes a version of this dharani which is called Aparimitaguṇānuśāṁsadhāraṇī (The Dhāraṇī Praising the Qualities of the Immeasurable One):

namo ratnatrayāya namo bhagavate amitabhāya tathāgatāya arhate saṃyaksambuddhāya | tadyathā oṃ amite amitodbhave amitasaṃbhave amitavikrānte amitagamini gaganakīrtikare sarvakleśakṣayaṃkare svāhā |

Translation: "I pay homage to the Three Jewels. I pay homage to the thus-gone, worthy, perfect buddha‍—the blessed Amitābha with the following: Oṃ infinite one who arises from the infinite, whose nature is infinite, whose stride is infinite, whose range is infinite, who grants renown vast as the sky, who brings an end to all the afflictions, svāhā."

==== Alternative Sanskrit versions ====
Oskar Von Hinuber cites other versions from Central Asia such as:

namo amitābhāya tathāgatāya tadyathā amṛ[te am]ṛto-bhate amṛtasaṃbhave amitagaganakīrtakare svāhā

and

namo amitābhāya tathāgatāya tadyathā maṛte phu amṛte phu amṛtaviśodhane phu svāhā

==== Chinese with back-transcription ====
From CBETA's Gunabhadra edition (Taisho 0368):

南無 阿彌多婆夜 哆他伽哆夜
namo amitābhāya tathāgatāya
哆地夜他
tadyathā
阿彌利都婆毘
amṛtodbhave
阿彌利哆悉眈 婆毘
amṛtasiddhaṃ bhave
阿彌利哆毘迦蘭諦
amṛtavikrānte
阿彌利哆毘迦蘭哆
amṛtavikrānta
伽彌膩 伽伽那 枳多迦隷
gāmine gagana kīrtakare
莎婆訶
svāhā

==== Chinese with corresponding pinyin transcription ====
From CBETA's Gunabhadra edition (Taisho 0368):

南無 阿彌多婆夜 哆他伽哆夜
námó ēmíduōpóyè duōtāqíeduōyè
哆地夜他
Duōdìyètā
阿彌利都婆毘
ēmílìdōupópí
阿彌利哆悉眈 婆毘
ēmílìduōxīdān pópí
阿彌利哆毘迦蘭諦
ēmílìduōpíjiālándì
阿彌利哆毘迦蘭哆
ēmílìduōpíjiālánduō
伽彌膩 伽伽那 枳多迦隷
qíemínì qíeqíenuó zhǐduō jiālì
莎婆訶
suōpóhē

=== Long version ===
The Sanskrit titles of this long version is called the Dhāraṇī of Amitāyus Tathāgata 無量壽如來根本陀羅尼 (Ārya Amitābha nāma dhāraṇī) or the Sarvatathāgatāyurvajrahṛdaya-dhāraṇī.

It is found in various versions. Amoghavajra's Wuliangshou rulai guanxing gongyang yigui (無量壽如來觀行供養儀軌 T. 930) is "arguably one of the most influential Esoteric Pure Land texts in East Asia" according to Proffit. The Sanskrit of Amoghavajra's version is called Ārya Amitābha nāma dhāraṇī:

Namo ratna-trayāya,

Namaḥ āryā'mitābhāyā,

Tathāgatāyā'rhate samyak_saṃbuddhāya, tad_yathā,

Oṃ amṛte amṛtodbhave amṛta-saṃbhave amṛta-garbhe,

Amṛta-siddhe amṛta-teje amṛta-vikrānte,

Amṛta-vikrānta-gāmine amṛta-gagana-kīrti-kare,

Amṛta-dundubhi-svare sarvārtha-sādhane,

Sarva-karma-kleśa-kṣayaṃ-kare svāhā.

The Sanskrit of the dharani in the Stein collection print is:

Namo ratnatrayāya

Nama āryā'mitābhāya

tathāgatāyā'rhate saṃyaksaṃbuddhāya

Tadyathā:

oṃ amṛte amṛtodbhave amṛtasaṃbhave amṛtagarbhe

amṛtasiddhe amṛtateje amṛtavikrānte

amṛtavikrāntagāmini amṛtagaganakīrtikari

amṛtadun-dubhisvare sarvārthasādhani

sarvakarmakleśakṣayaṃkari svāhā

Aum, brum, hum

English:

Homage to the Three Jewels,

Homage to the noble Amitabha (Infinite Light),

to the Tathāgata, the Arhat, the completely and perfectly awakened one (samyaksambuddha).

Thus:

Oṃ O immortality (amrta), O maker of immortality! O born of immortality! O essence/embryo (garbha) of immortality!

O immortality perfecting one! O the brilliance (teja) of immortality! O he who goes beyond immortality!

O he who goes beyond immortality and whose glory is infinite as the sky (amṛtagaganakīrtikare)

O sound of the drum of immortality realizing (sadhane) benefit for all.

O he who destroys (ksayam) all karmic afflictions. Hail!

== Other versions ==
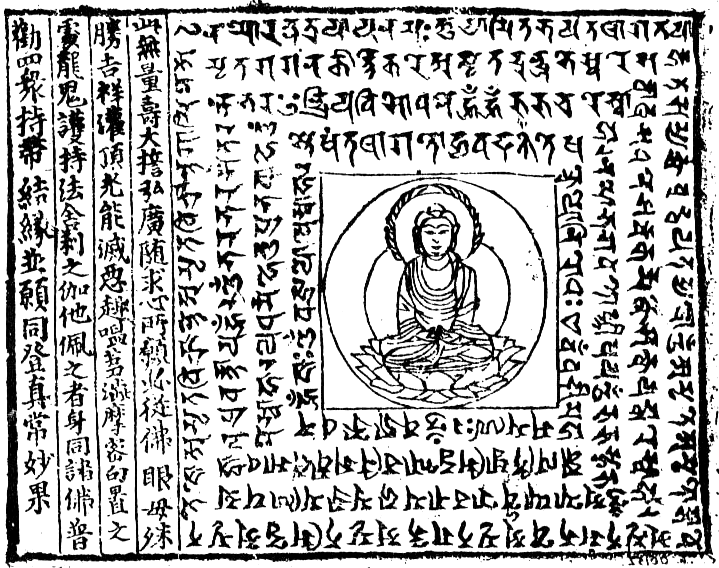
Image of the engraving of the dhāraṇī discovered by Stein at the Mogao Caves, Dunhuang, China.

An even longer expanded version was discovered in Dunhuang's Mogao Caves by Aurel Stein (1862–1943) which contains the core long version of the dhāraṇī (in the Siddham script) with further additions (such as the mantra of light) and dates to the Five Dynasties (926–975 CE) era.

According to Gergely Hidas, the xylograph was likely "produced to serve as amulets". He further adds that "as for the sequence of the incantations, after the prime dhāraṇī dedicated to the depicted deity, further formulas are included most probably to enhance the efficacy of the amulet. The designers of these talismans are likely to have been monastic people with knowledge of Sanskrit and an understanding of the spells used. These objects were probably meant for a Chinese-speaking lay clientele in exchange for donations and must have been folded, wrapped and worn on the body."

=== Sanskrit ===
Gergely Hidas' critical edition of the Sanskrit text is as follows:

[1] namo ratnatrayāya | nama āryāmitābhāya tathāgatāyārhate saṃyaksaṃbuddhāya | tadyathā |

oṃ amṛte amṛtodbhave amṛtasaṃbhave amṛtagarbhe amṛtasiddhe amṛtateje amṛtavikrānte amṛtavikrāntagāmini amṛtagaganakīrtikari amṛtadun-dubhisvare sarvārthasādhani sarvakarmakleśakṣayaṃkari svāhā |

[2] oṃ amoghavairocanamahāmudrāmaṇipadmajvāla pravartaya hūṃ|

[3] oṃ bhara bhara saṃ bhara saṃbhara indriyaviśodhani hūṃ hūṃ ruru cale svāhā |

[4] namo bhagavatoṣṇīṣāya | oṃ ruru sphuru jvala tiṣ ṭha siddhalocane sarvārthasādhani svāhā |

[5] ye dharmā hetuprabhavā hetuṃ teṣāṃ tathāgato hy avadat teṣāṃ ca yo nirodha evaṃvādī mahāśramaṇaḥ |

[6] oṃ vajrakrodhana hūṃ jaḥ |

[7] oṃ vajrāyuṣe svāhā |

=== English ===
Hidas' English translation (with the titles of each dharani / mantra):

1. Obeisance to the Three Jewels and Amitābha, The Sarvatathāgatāyurvajrahṛdayadhāraṇī

Veneration to the Three Jewels. Veneration to the noble Amitābha, the Tathāgata, the Arhat, the Perfectly Awakened One. Namely, Oṃ O Immortality, O the One Arisen from Immortality, O Immortality-born, O Immortality-child, O Immortality-perfect, O Immortality-power, O Immortality-valour, O the One Acting by Immortality-valour, O Immortality-sky-fame-maker, O Immortality-kettledrum-sound, O the One who Accomplishes all Aims, O Destroyer of all Defilements originating from [bad] Actions svāhā.

2. The Prabhāsa-mantra (Mantra of Light, Chin. Guangming zhenyan, Jap. Komyo Shingon)

Oṃ O Light of the Jewel-lotus that is the Great Seal of the Unfailing Vairocana advance hūṃ.

3. The Mahāpratisarā-upahṛdayavidyā heart mantra

Oṃ provide, provide, support, support, O Purifier of the Abilities, hūṃ hūṃ ruru cale svāhā.

4. Obeisance to Uṣṇīṣa. The Tathāgatalocanā-mahāvidyā

Veneration to the glorious Uṣṇīṣa. oṃ ruru sphuru shine, stand by, O the One with Accomplished Eyes, O the One who Accomplishes all Aims svāhā.

5. The Pratītyasamutpāda-gāthā

Those dharmas which arise from a cause, the Tathāgata has declared their cause, and that which is the cessation of them. Thus the great renunciant has taught.

6. The Ucchuṣma-mantra

Oṃ O Vajrakrodhana hūṃ jaḥ

7. The Āyurvardhanī-vidyā (the formula which increases long life) of Vajrāyus

Oṃ svāhā to Adamantine Life (Vajrāyus, i.e. Amitayus).

The Chinese text printed on the side of the dhāraṇī states:

This Great Vow [spell] of the Infinite Life [Buddha] is enormous and extensive.The Wish-fulfilling [spell] is [like] whatever your heart wishes, it will necessarily follow. The Buddha Eye Mother [spell] is extraordinarily auspicious. The Consecrated Light [spell] can destroy the bad paths [of rebirth]. The dragon-spirits [will] protect the place where the Ucchuṣma-mantra is put. As for the Verse of the Dharma-body, those who wear it at the waist will be equal to the Buddhas. The four assemblies are universally encouraged to keep and wear this [amulet] to create a karmic basis [for a good future] and it is also avowed that they [will] ascend together to the true and eternal wonderful fruit.

== See also ==
- Amitābha
