= Zhiyi =

Chinese Buddhist master who founded the Tiantai school

- 智顗
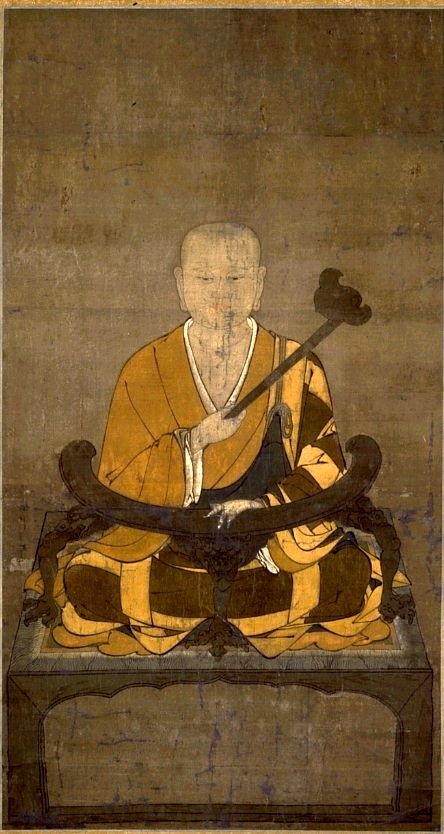
- Painting of Tiantai Zhiyi holding a ruyi scepter

Personal life
- Born: 16 February 538 Gong'an County, Hubei, China
- Died: 3 August 597 (aged 59) Tiantai County, Zhejiang, China
- Other names: Chen De'an (陳德安), Master Tiantai (天台大師), Master Zhizhe (智者大師)

Religious life
- Religion: Buddhism
- Temple: Waguan Temple; Guoqing Temple
- School: Tiantai
- Lineage: 4th generation
- Dharma name: Zhiyi

Senior posting
- Teacher: Faxu (法緒); Huikuang (慧曠); Nanyue Huisi

Zhiyi

Chinese name
- Traditional Chinese: 智顗
- Simplified Chinese: 智𫖮
Transcriptions
Standard Mandarin
- Hanyu Pinyin: Zhìyǐ
- Wade–Giles: Chih^{4}-i^{3}
- IPA: [ʈʂɻ̩̂.ì]
Yue: Cantonese
- Yale Romanization: Ji-ngáih
- Jyutping: Zi3-ngai5
- IPA: [tsi˧.ŋɐj˩˧]

Korean name
- Hangul: 지의
Transcriptions
- Revised Romanization: Jiui

Japanese name
- Kanji: 智顗
Transcriptions
- Romanization: Chigi

Zhiyi (Chinese: 智顗; pinyin: Zhìyǐ; Wade–Giles: Chih-i; Japanese pronunciation: Chigi; Korean: 지의; 538–597 CE) also called Tiantai Dashi (天台大師) and Zhizhe (智者, "Wise One"), was a Chinese Buddhist monk, philosopher, meditation teacher, and exegete. He is considered to be the founder of the Tiantai Buddhist tradition, as well as its fourth patriarch. Śramaṇa Zhiyi is widely regarded as one of the most influential figures in the development of East Asian Buddhist thought and practice. As the first major Chinese Buddhist thinker to construct a comprehensive religious system based primarily on Chinese interpretations, Zhiyi played a crucial role in synthesizing various strands of Mahayana Buddhism into a unique coherent framework. According to David W. Chappell, Zhiyi "has been ranked with Thomas Aquinas and al-Ghazali as one of the great systematizers of religious thought and practice in world history."

Zhiyi relied on the teachings of the Lotus Sutra as the main basis for his system, though he also drew on numerous texts, such as the works of Nagarjuna. One of his central innovations was the Threefold Truth, which unifies the truths of emptiness, and provisional existence, with a holistic third truth: the middle. Zhiyi also developed an influential interpretation of the Lotus Sutra, which he used to interpret all other Mahayana Buddhist teachings. Zhiyi's comprehensive work on Buddhist practice, the Mohe Zhiguan (Great Cessation-Contemplation), outlines step-by-step instructions for Buddhist meditation and cultivation, combining traditional Indian methods with unique innovations. This text continues to serve as an influential guide for meditators across East Asian Buddhist traditions.

Zhiyi's Tiantai school became one of the most significant Buddhist traditions in imperial China, and its teachings later spread to Korea, Japan and Vietnam. Zhiyi's synthesis of doctrine and practice remains a cornerstone of East Asian Buddhist philosophy. His three great works, the Great Cessation-Contemplation, the Profound Meaning of The Lotus Sutra, and the Words and Phrases of The Lotus Sutra are the foundational treatises for the Tiantai, Tendai (Japanese) and Cheontae (Korean) traditions. Zhiyi's works also influenced other Buddhist traditions, such as Chan/Zen, Pure Land and Nichiren Buddhism, and continue to be studied by Asian Buddhists for their depth, clarity, and systematic approach to Buddhist thought. His system provides a universalist Mahayana framework which allowed it to easily adapt to new times and cultures.

== Biography ==
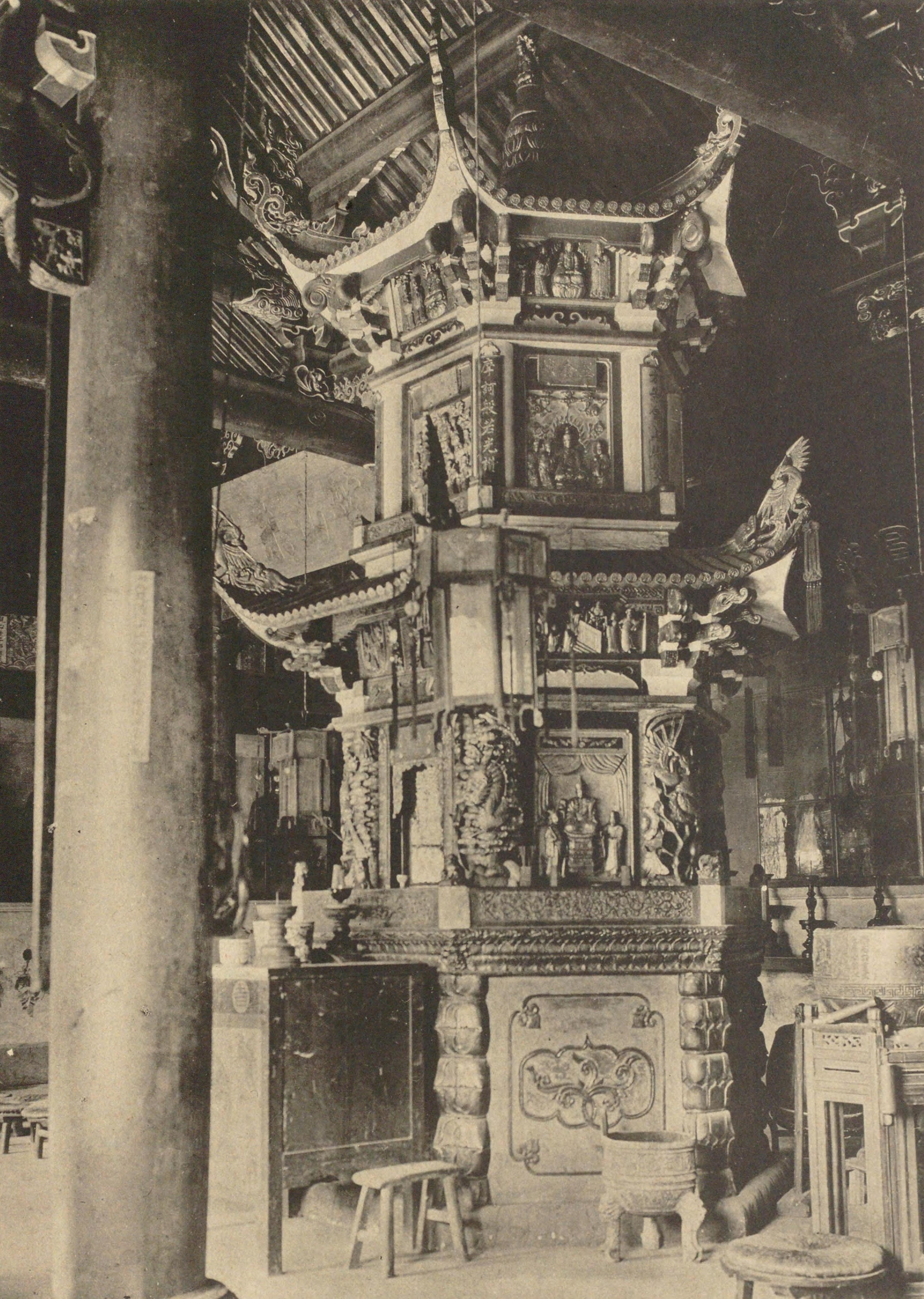
Stupa (pagoda) of Zhiyi at Zhenjue temple

Born with the surname Chen (陳) in Huarong District, Jing Prefecture (now Hubei), Zhiyi lost his parents and hometown of Jiangling to the Western Wei army when he was just seventeen. He subsequently became a Buddhist monk at eighteen. As a young monk, he studied Mahayana sutras and Vinaya, and also recited the Threefold Lotus Sutra, under the guidance of Vinaya master Huikuang (d.u.).

At 23, Zhiyi met his most important teacher, Nanyue Huisi (515–577 CE), a meditation and Lotus Sutra master who would later be listed as Zhiyi's predecessor in the Tiantai lineage. On first meeting, Huisi is said to have greeted Zhiyi as an old friend, since he recognized that they had both been present in the Lotus Sutra assembly at Vulture's Peak. Under Huisi's tutelage (from 560 to 567), Zhiyi practiced the Lotus Samadhi Repentance, the Pratyutpanna Samadhi, the suiziyi sanmei (the samādhi of freely flowing thoughts), the Lotus Sutra based "four practices of ease and bliss" (si anle xing), and the meditative recitation of the Lotus Sutra.

In 567, Zhiyi (now 30 and approved by Huisi as his successor) traveled with several followers to Waguansi monastery at the Southern capital of Jinling (Jiangsu) to give teachings on the Lotus Sutra and the Dazhidu lun. He spent eight years at the capital teaching. After eight years, feeling that his efforts in the capital were not effective in bringing people to the true Dharma, he moved to Tiantai mountain (Zhejiang province) in 575, where he would remain for eleven years studying and practicing. This move came around the same time as the second great persecution of Buddhism by Emperor Wu (r. 561–578) was raging in the north. Zhiyi also built a monastery on mountain Tiantai, which was later named Xiuchansi (修禪寺).

In 585 Zhiyi returned to the capital of Jinling as requested by the king of Chen. It is here that he would give a series of lectures on the Lotus Sutra which would later be edited by his disciple into an influential commentary, the Miao Falianhua wenju (妙法蓮華文句; "Words and Phrases of the Wondrous Dharma Lotus Flower", or Fahua wenju for short, T. 1718). Zhiyi also acted as preceptor of the bodhisattva precepts to the future Emperor Yang (r. 604–617) of Sui, at the prince's request, who then granted Zhiyi the title of Dashi "Zhizhe" (Great Master Wise Man). He then founded another monastery in his native Jingzhou which later came to be called Yuquansi (玉泉寺).

In the latter part of his life, he gave other lectures which would become his other great works, the Fahua xuanyi (Profound Meaning of The Lotus Sutra) and the Mohe zhiguan (Great Calming and Insight). He also wrote two commentaries on the Vimalakīrtinirdeśa just before the end of his life in 597.

Guanding's biography of Zhiyi states that as he was dying he made offerings to Maitreya, recited the names of Amitabha, Prajña and Avalokitesvara (Guanyin), and listened to recitations from the Lotus Sutra and the Contemplation Sutra while waiting for Avalokitesvara to welcome him into the pure land.

Zhiyi is said to have thirty two direct disciples. Guanding (561–632) was his most influential disciple, since he was responsible for recording and preserving the master's legacy. It was Guanding who edited and published the master's lectures into the Mohe Zhiguan and the two great commentaries on the Lotus Sutra. Guanding also wrote his own original works, including two commentaries on the Nirvana Sutra.

Zhiyi was vastly influential on the development of East Asian Buddhism. His Tiantai school became one of the most important traditions of Buddhist study and practice in the history of China and Japan (where it became Tendai Buddhism). Zhiyi's work also influenced the development of other traditions like Chan and Pure Land.

== Works ==
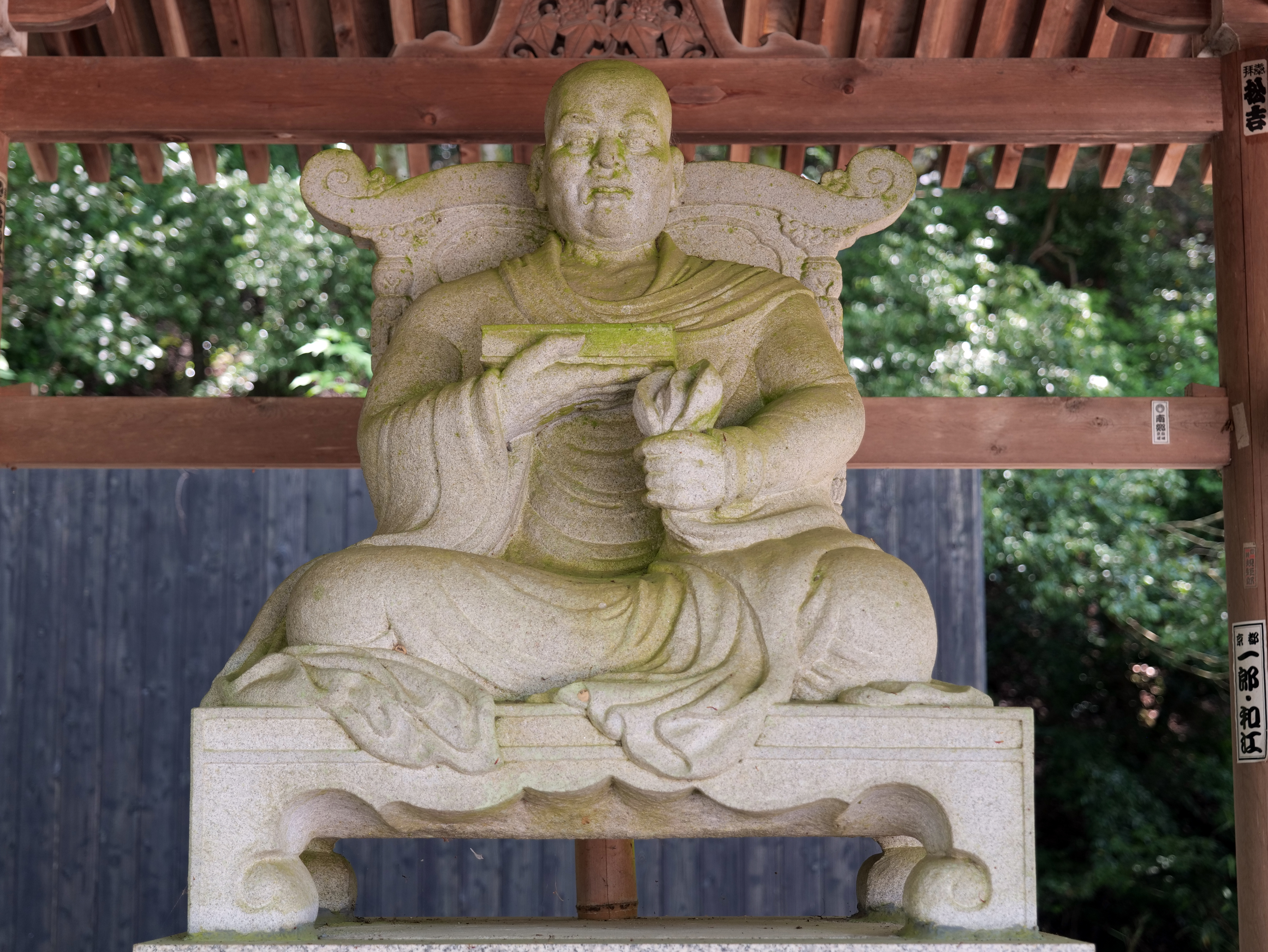
Statue of Zhiyi holding a scripture, at Mii-dera temple, Shiga prefecture, Japan

=== Major works ===
Zhiyi's major works are known as the "Three Great Works of Tiantai" (天台三大部) or "Three Great Texts of the Lotus". These key works were compiled and edited by Zhiyi's disciple Guanding (561–632) from Zhiyi's lectures and writings. The three texts are:

- Words and Phrases of the Wondrous Dharma Lotus Flower (妙法蓮華文句; Miao Falianhua wenju, or Fahua wenju for short, T. 1718), a traditional commentary which discusses each passage of the sutra.
- Profound Meaning of the Wondrous Dharma Lotus Flower (妙法蓮 華經玄義; Miao Falianhua jing xuanyi, short title: 法華玄義; Fahua xuanyi, T. 1716), a commentary which discusses the essential meaning of the Lotus Sutra.
- Great Calming-Insight (摩訶止觀; Mohe Zhiguan, T. 1911), a large treatise on doctrine and practice, based on lectures given by Zhiyi towards the end of his life, which were edited and arranged by his student Guanding. The title owes its name to the practice of samatha (止; zhǐ; "calming or stabilizing meditation") and vipasyana (觀; guān; "clear seeing or insight"), which Zhiyi uses to cover the entirety of the Buddha Dharma. This work, though seen by tradition as also based on the Lotus Sutra, actually draws on numerous Mahayana texts to explicate the "perfect and sudden" (yuan-tun) teachings on meditation. It cites sutras like the Avatamsaka Sutra extensively, even more than the Lotus Sutra.

There is also another very important text by Zhiyi which is used as an introductory text to the study of Tiantai Buddhism. This is the twelve fascicle On the Four Teachings (四教義; Sijiao yi, T 1929), which introduces the Tiantai view through an analysis of the fourfold teaching schema (which divides the Buddha's teaching into four aspects: Tripitaka, Shared, Separate, and Complete).

=== Important practice texts ===
These are the three Major Tiantai treatises studied in mainland Tiantai and Japanese Tendai and remain the cornerstone of the tradition's doctrine and practice.

Zhiyi also wrote three shorter works on meditation practice, explaining different approaches calming and insight practice:

- Explanation of the Sequential Dharma Gates of Dhyāna Pāramitā (釋禪波羅蜜次第法門 T 1916), which presents his teachings on the "gradual and sequential" approach to calming and insight meditation and was written towards the beginning of Zhiyi's career
- The Xiao Zhiguan (simplified Chinese: 小止观; traditional Chinese: 小止觀; pinyin: Xiǎo Zhǐguān; Wade–Giles: Hsiao chih-kuan; lit Small Calming and Insight) was probably the first practical manual of meditation in China. With its direct influence on the Tso-chan-i, this smaller meditation treatise was very influential in the development of Chan meditation.
- The Six Wondrous Dharma Gates (六妙法門 T 1917), presents the "variable" approach to calming and insight.

Zhiyi is also known for having composed four repentance rites, which influenced later Chinese Buddhist rituals and remain part of the Chinese Buddhist repertoire today. His four main repentance rites are:

- Repentance Ritual for the Lotus Sūtra Samādhi (法華三昧懺儀; Fǎhuá Sānmèi Chànyí, T 1941)
- Vaipulya-samādhi Repentance Practice (方等三昧懺法; Fangdeng sanmei chanfa),
- Repentance Ritual of Petitioning Avalokiteśvara (請觀世音懺法; Qing Guanshiyin chanfa),
- Golden Light Repentance Practice (金光明懺法; Jin'guangming chanfa)

=== Other attributed works ===
There are also numerous other texts attributed to Zhiyi in the Taishō Tripiṭaka, though scholars are unsure of their provenance. Some of these may have been written by his disciples or later Tiantai authors. In particular, the works on Pure Land sutras and on Guanyin are seen by modern scholars as later works, while the commentaries on the Vimalakīrti Sūtra are seen as important authentic works of Zhiyi. However, all these works remain important in the Tiantai tradition, which generally considers them as authentic. These secondary attributed works are:

1. Profound Commentary on the Vimalakīrti Sūtra (維摩經玄疏; Wéimó Jīng Xuánshū, T 1777), an important work which was written by Zhiyi himself
2. Concise Commentary on the Vimalakīrti Sūtra (維摩經略疏; Wéimó Jīng Lüèshū, T 1778)
3. Treatise on Contemplating the Mind (觀心論; Guānxīn Lùn, T 1920), also called Treatise on the Churning of Milk, an authentic and important late work of Zhiyi
4. Commentary on the Vajracchedikā Prajñāpāramitā Sūtra (金剛般若經疏; Jīngāng Bōrě Jīng Shū, T 1698)
5. Commentary on the Sūtra for Humane Kings (仁王護國般若經疏; Rénwáng Hùguó Bōrě Jīng Shū, T 1705)
6. Profound Meaning of the Golden Light Sūtra (金光明經玄義; Jīnguāngmíng Jīng Xuányì, T 1783)
7. Textual Commentary on the Golden Light Sūtra (金光明經文句; Jīnguāngmíng Jīng Wénjù, T 1785)
8. Commentary on the Meaning of the Bodhisattva Precepts (菩薩戒義疏; Púsà Jiè Yìshū, T 1811)
9. Essentials of Seated Meditation in the Practice of Calming and Contemplation (修習止觀坐禪法要; Xiūxí Zhǐguān Zuòchán Fǎyào, T 1915)
10. The Four Foundations of Mindfulness (四念處; Sì Niànchù, T 1918)
11. Oral Instructions on Meditation from the Great Master Zhiyi of Tiantai (天台智者大師禪門口訣; Tiāntái Zhìzhě Dàshī Chánmén Kǒujué, T 1919)
12. Explanation of the Mahāprajñāpāramitā Enlightening-Thought Samādhi (釋摩訶般若波羅蜜覺意三昧; Shì Móhē Bōrě Bōluómì Juéyì Sānmèi, T 1922)
13. Gradual Entry into the Dharmadhātu (法界次第初門; Fǎjiè Cìdì Chūmén, T 1925)
14. The Fourfold Teachings (四教義; Sì Jiàoyì, T 1929)
15. Practice Methods for the Samādhi of the Expanded Teachings (方等三昧行法; Fāngděng Sānmèi Xíngfǎ, T 1940)
16. Treatise on Ten Doubts about the Pure Land (淨土十疑論; Jìngtǔ Shíyí Lùn, T 1961)
17. The Five Expedient Gates of Mindfulness of the Buddha (五方便念佛門; Wǔ Fāngbiàn Niànfó Mén, T 1962)
18. Profound Meaning of Avalokiteśvara (觀音玄義; Guānyīn Xuányì, T 1726)
19. Commentary on the Meaning of Avalokiteśvara (觀音義疏; Guānyīn Yìshū, T 1728)
20. Commentary on the Sūtra of Inviting Avalokiteśvara (請觀音經疏; Qǐng Guānyīn Jīng Shū, T 1800)
21. Commentary on the Sūtra on the Visualization of Amitāyus (觀無量壽經疏; Guān Wúliàngshòu Jīng Shū, T 1750)
22. Notes on the Meaning of the Amitābha Sūtra (阿彌陀經義記; Āmítuó Jīng Yìjì, T 1755)

== Teaching ==
=== Interpretation of the Lotus Sutra ===
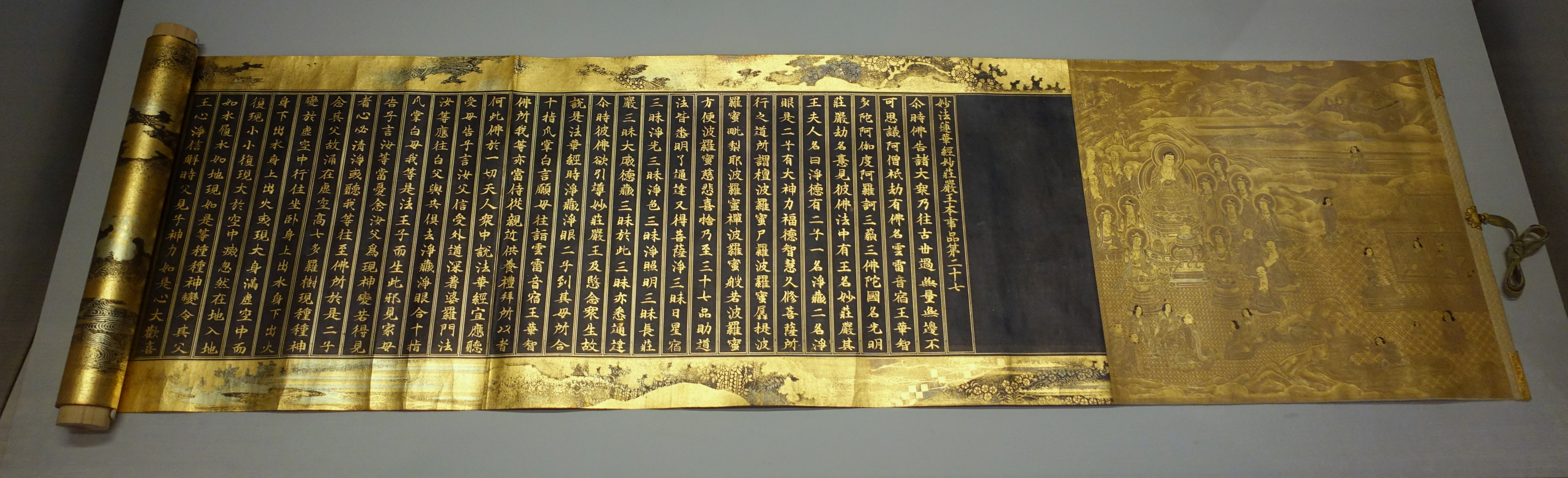
A scroll of the Lotus Sutra, Japan, Edo period

Zhiyi's exegetical works make use of a hermeneutical scheme called the fivefold profound meanings which can also be applied to any Buddhist sutra and was widely influential on later Chinese Buddhist exegesis. These five fundamental elements of interpreting a sutra are:

1. Explaining the title (釋名; shiming)
2. Explaining the essence (辨體; bianti)
3. Clarifying the main point (明宗; mingzong)
4. Discussing the function/application (論用; lunyong)
5. Classification of the [various Buddhist] teachings (判教; panjiao)

The longest section (2/3rds) of Zhiyi's Profound Meaning of the Wondrous Dharma Lotus Flower is his discussion of the title, which for Zhiyi reveals the Buddha's insight and contains the whole teaching of the Lotus Sutra. In discussing the term "wondrous" or "sublime" (妙; miao), Zhiyi argues that this refers to ultimate reality itself (實相; shixiang), which is the perfect interfusion of the three truths (圓融三諦; yuanrong sandi). Furthermore, Zhiyi argues that the essential meaning of the Lotus Sutra is Suchness, the true nature of reality. Zhiyi describes the ultimate reality or Subtle Dharma in different ways, using quotes from texts like the Da zhidu lun and the Nirvana Sutra. He writes that while the ultimate is "given many names" and can be described by "various terms" it is still a single truth. He uses various terms for the Subtle Dharma, such as “the true aspect of reality” (實相), “true reality” (眞實), and the Middle Way (中道), describing it as inexpressible, and beyond conceptual understanding.

Regarding the "main point" of the Sutra, Zhiyi describes it as "the cause and fruit of the Buddha’s own practice", which refers to Buddhahood itself, and the practices which lead one to it. Zhiyi sees the Lotus as the sutra which reveals the Buddha's pure insight, unmixed with any expedients and based on the ultimate truth. According to Zhiyi, previous sutras taught by the Buddha were still mixed with various secondary skillful means, but the Lotus directly communicates the Buddha's ultimate method. Regarding the function of the sutra, Zhiyi sees it as being contained in a twofold knowledge of the true and the provisional. True knowledge knows ultimate reality (the triple truth), while provisional knowledge knows the particulars, and is thus able to lead all beings through skillful means.

The final profound meaning, the classification of teachings, divides the Buddha's teachings into five different flavors or stages. They are the coarser teachings of the Avatamsaka, Tripitaka (Hinayana), Vaipulya (Mahayana) and Perfection of Wisdom teachings and the final "complete" or "round" (圆; yuan) teachings of the Lotus Sutra, which is the sublime teaching that communicates absolute reality directly. The "complete" or "sublime" teaching (the two terms being synonyms) is said to be all-encompassing, integrating all teachings within it, and indeed, all phenomena (dharmas). It is also the “inseparability” (即; ji) of all things, the non-duality of all skillful means and the unity of opposites, such as samsara and nirvana or delusion and enlightenment.

For Zhiyi, the sublime teaching can be understood from the point of view of the relative truth, as the relative sublime (相待 妙; xiangdai miao) and can also be viewed as the absolute sublime (絶待妙; juedai miao) from the ultimate perspective. The relative sublime refers to when we view the sublime teaching (of the Lotus Sutra) in contrast to the other "coarser" teachings, and thus, it is sublime only in relation to the coarse. It also means that the Lotus Sutra can serve as a hermeneutical key to interpret and organize all other Buddhist teachings. The absolute sublime meanwhile refers to a teaching that transcends all relative teachings and all dualisms, including notions of sublime or coarse, while also including all other teachings within it. Since this is a teaching beyond all discrimination and conceptualization, it is "inconceivable". Since it overcomes all distinctions and is all-inclusive, it is a teaching in which "the sublime is immediately the coarse (妙卽麤; miao ji cu) and the coarse is immediately the sublime (麤卽 妙; cu ji miao)", abandoning all distinction between sublime and coarse. The absolute sublime is also a teaching in which "there is nothing which is relative, and nothing which is absolute".

For Zhiyi, this ultimate non-dual teaching is the unique teaching only found in the Sublime Dharma Lotus Sutra, and is the essential meaning of the title. This means that while the Lotus is superior to all other sutras from a relative point of view, it is also one with the teachings of all sutras, which are identical to the Lotus from an absolute perspective. All other sutras and teachings are thus expressions or modes of the Lotus Sutra's complete teaching. The Lotus is also the master key that "unlocks" the true meaning of all other teachings (which is none other than the Lotus Sutra's teaching of the unity of all teachings and all phenomena). Thus, the Lotus Sutra shows that all other sutras are really also the Lotus Sutra, i.e. the Buddha-wisdom of the non-duality of all things. The idea of the "round/ perfect teaching" (yuanjiao) does not originate with Zhiyi, and can be found in previous writings of Baoliang (444–509) and Huiguang (468–537). Zhiyi's unique contribution is in his adapting the term to signify the all-encompassing non-dual nature of the Buddha's teaching in the Lotus Sutra.

=== Trace and Original teachings ===
Zhiyi divides the 28 chapters of the Lotus Sutra into two parts: the Trace Gate (跡門; jimen, shakumon) which teaches the One Vehicle (as myriad skillful means), and the Root or Original Gate (本門; benmen, honmon), which teaches the eternal lifespan of the Buddha and the Buddha's ultimate intention and activities. Hans-Rudolf Kantor also notes that the basic terminology of "root and traces" (ben ji) was borrowed from Sengzhao by Zhiyi.

According to Kantor, for Zhiyi, the Lotus Sutra's internal structure "mirrors the sūtra’s intertextual relationship with all the other scriptures (sūtras)". Indeed, Zhiyi sees the Lotus Sutra as embodying the Buddha's enlightenment, which is "the non-dual 'root' which enables all the teachings of the other sūtras to function as the bipolar 'traces' that guide back to liberation." This relationship between the provisional skillful means and the ultimate teaching that is their goal (and their ultimate reality) is described by Zhiyi through the phrase "Opening the Provisional to Reveal the Real".

==== Trace teaching ====
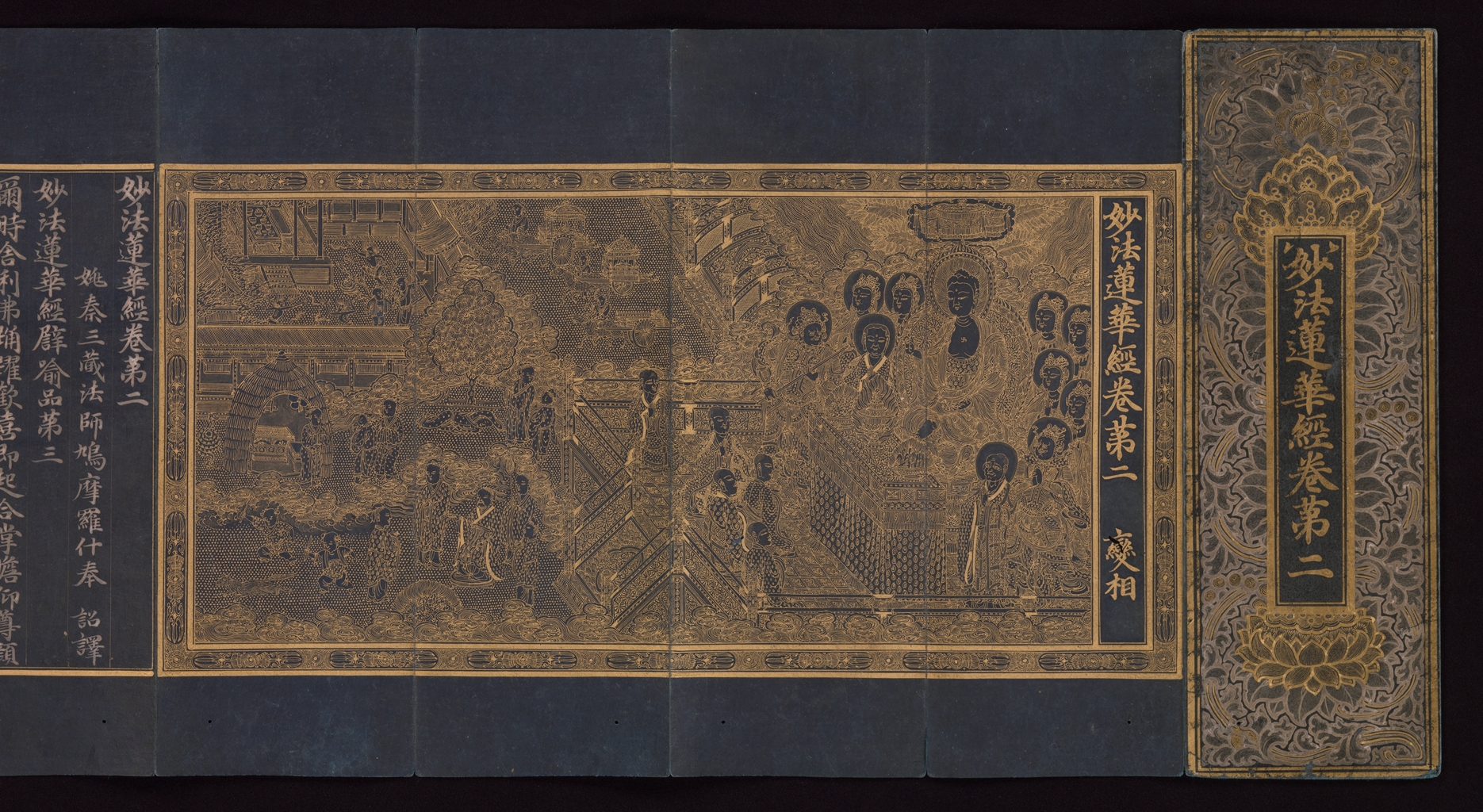
Illustration of the parable of the burning house from the Lotus Sutra. A father (Buddha) uses the idea of three carts to entice his sons out of a burning house (samsara). Afterwards, Buddha reveals that there is only one great magnificent ox-cart (the One Vehicle).

The first 14 chapters constitute the Trace Gate, since it presents the many "traces" arising from the "root" of enlightenment, and presents the Buddha as a "manifestation body". This section reveals the teaching of the One Vehicle (ekayāna) by revealing that all provisional teachings of the Three Vehicles (the Śrāvaka, Pratyekabuddha, and Bodhisattva paths) are nothing but expedient ways (upaya) to the Single Buddha Vehicle. This teaching emphasizes the Buddha's skillful means in presenting various methods to different kinds of beings with varying capacities. In spite of their differences, all paths taught by the Buddha are said to eventually converge in the One Vehicle that leads all beings to Buddhahood. For Zhiyi, this means that while the various doctrines and methods taught by the Buddha in all the different sutras might sometimes seem contradictory, they are ultimately describing and leading to the same state (even if beings on those paths do not know it). Zhiyi describes this aspect of the sutra by stating that it “opens the three vehicles to reveal the one vehicle.”

For Zhiyi, the Lotus Sutra's doctrine of the One Vehicle offered an inclusive meta-doctrine for understanding all Buddhist teachings. Zhiyi described the One Vehicle as "subtle" and "wonderful" compared to lesser, coarser teachings—though this distinction is only relative. From the ultimate perspective, the One Vehicle transcends comparison since no teaching exists outside it and it thus includes all the Buddha's teachings and in fact, is all the teachings. Thus, Zhiyi saw the One Vehicle as open and all-encompassing, integrating all of Buddhism into a single holistic framework. This One Vehicle teaching is also called the "Round" or "Complete" Teaching (圓教; yuan jiao), since it encircles everything, and lacks any sharp edges or divisions

Zhiyi saw the Complete teaching of the One Vehicle as being composed of four types of unity: the oneness of the teachings (all teachings of the Buddha are non-contradictory and have one intent), the oneness of the practices (all lead to Buddhahood), the oneness of persons (all will attain Buddhahood), and the oneness of reality. According to Zhiyi, any text which is consistent with these concepts teaches "the Subtle Dharma" (miaofa). As Zhiyi states in the Profound Meaning of Lotus Sutra: "various terms name one ultimate reality. Only one ultimate reality is given many names."

Zhiyi also organizes all the various skillful means taught by the Buddha through the schema of the four doctrines or four siddhantas (which he takes from the Da zhidu lun). In this schema, the Buddha teaches according to (1) worldly convention; (2) suited to an individual's habits and preconceptions; (3) as therapeutic counteragents for specific defilements; and (4) in terms of Ultimate Truth. The Da zhidu lun also states: "All is real, all is not real, all is both real and unreal, all is neither real nor unreal - this is called the Ultimate Reality about all dharmas. In this way, all the scriptures are everywhere speaking the Ultimate Truth." Zhiyi's interpretation of the One Vehicle follows this idea that the ultimate truth is taught by the Buddha through numerous seemingly conflicting teachings which are nevertheless all true, as forms of the One Vehicle. These teachings are true and yet they are also unreal and illusory (like the three carts in the burning house parable). Thus, all Buddhists are practicing the One Vehicle which leads to Buddhahood, even those Buddhists who do not know it or who flatly reject the Mahayana. In some passages, Zhiyi takes this idea even further when he states that all dharmas (phenomena) are expressions of the ultimate truth itself. Thus he writes "all existing dharmas are marvels" since each phenomenon is revealed to be the nature and appearance of the Buddha realm. As Ziporyn writes "here the real nature of all phenomena is asserted to be none other than the principle of upaya [skillful means] itself, of a provisional positing that is perpetually exposed as false and superseded. The truth, in other words, is the process of falsehood (partial truth) leading to truth."

Zhiyi sees the term "lotus flower" (lian hua) in the sutra's title as an allegorical expression which points to the relationship between the relative three vehicles and the ultimate One Vehicle. Just like the flower blossom exists for the sake of the fruit, the relative teachings of the three vehicles exist only because of the One Vehicle. Similarly, the trace teaching exists because of the origin teaching. The provisional truth exists in order to reveal the real, and the real ultimate exists within the provisional. Thus, the term "lotus flower" in the title also symbolizes the entire teaching of the sutra, the "opening of the provisional to reveal the real" and the relationship between the three truths.

==== Original teaching ====
The latter 14 chapters constitute the Original Gate or Root Teaching, which reveals that Śākyamuni Buddha is not a recently enlightened being but in fact has been a Buddha for countless aeons (it thus presents the "original" or "primordial" Buddha, 本佛). This ancient Buddha's birth, awakening under the Bodhi tree, and apparent passing away (into nirvana) is just a skillful means. In reality, he has been ever-present in this very world, which is actually a serene pure land.

Zhiyi sees the essence of this teaching as being contained in the following passage from the Lotus Sutra: "Since I have been becoming Buddha, for eternal ages in a life full of uncountable eons, I have been constantly abiding without ever extinguishing." Thus, the real Buddha, the Dharma-nature (法性; faxing), has always been Buddha, giving rise to innumerable traces (teachings which are ultimately unreal and yet skillful), while also being unchanging wisdom. The inseparability of the root (Buddha, Lotus Sutra, ultimate wisdom) and the trace (manifestations, upayas, other sutras) is the Lotus Sutra's ultimate and sublime teaching. As Zhiyi writes in his treatise on the meaning of the title of the Lotus Sutra:

As for elucidating ‘root and traces’ in reference to ‘principle and things’, this is as stated [in the Vimalakīrti nirdeśa-sūtra]: ‘All dharmas are set up on account of the non-abiding root’ (無住本; wuzhu ben). Non-abiding principle (理; li) is the real mark and ultimate truth of the root-time (本時; benshi). All the dharmas are the densely intertwined conventional truths of the root-time. As the root of the real mark and ultimate truth leaves behind the traces of the conventional, the root of ultimate truth becomes manifest by pursuing the traces of the conventional. [We quote from Seng Zhao’s sūtra-commentary:] ‘Although root and traces must be differentiated, they are inconceivably one’.

Thus, the hidden ultimate reality, which is called here "non-abiding root", "principle", or "root time," is both atemporal, devoid of arising, abiding or cessation; and yet it is also instantiated in the world, being non-dual with temporal dependent phenomena which contain and lead back to the root. Thus, by following the traces we attain the root, by knowing the provisional teachings and phenomena, we attain the ultimate (as well as the unity of the two). For Zhiyi, this is what the teaching of the Lotus Sutra intends through "revealing the root by setting forth the traces" (發跡顯本; fa ji xian ben).

Zhiyi also argues that the primordial or original Buddha embodies all three Mahāyāna buddha bodies simultaneously. This interpretation presents these three bodies as inseparable and interpenetrating, such that the reward (Saṃbhogakāya) and manifest (Nirmāṇakāya) bodies share in the Dharmakāya's timelessness. This synthesis reflects Zhiyi's principle of unity, wherein the infinite and finite are fully interfused.

=== Threefold Truth and Threefold Contemplation ===
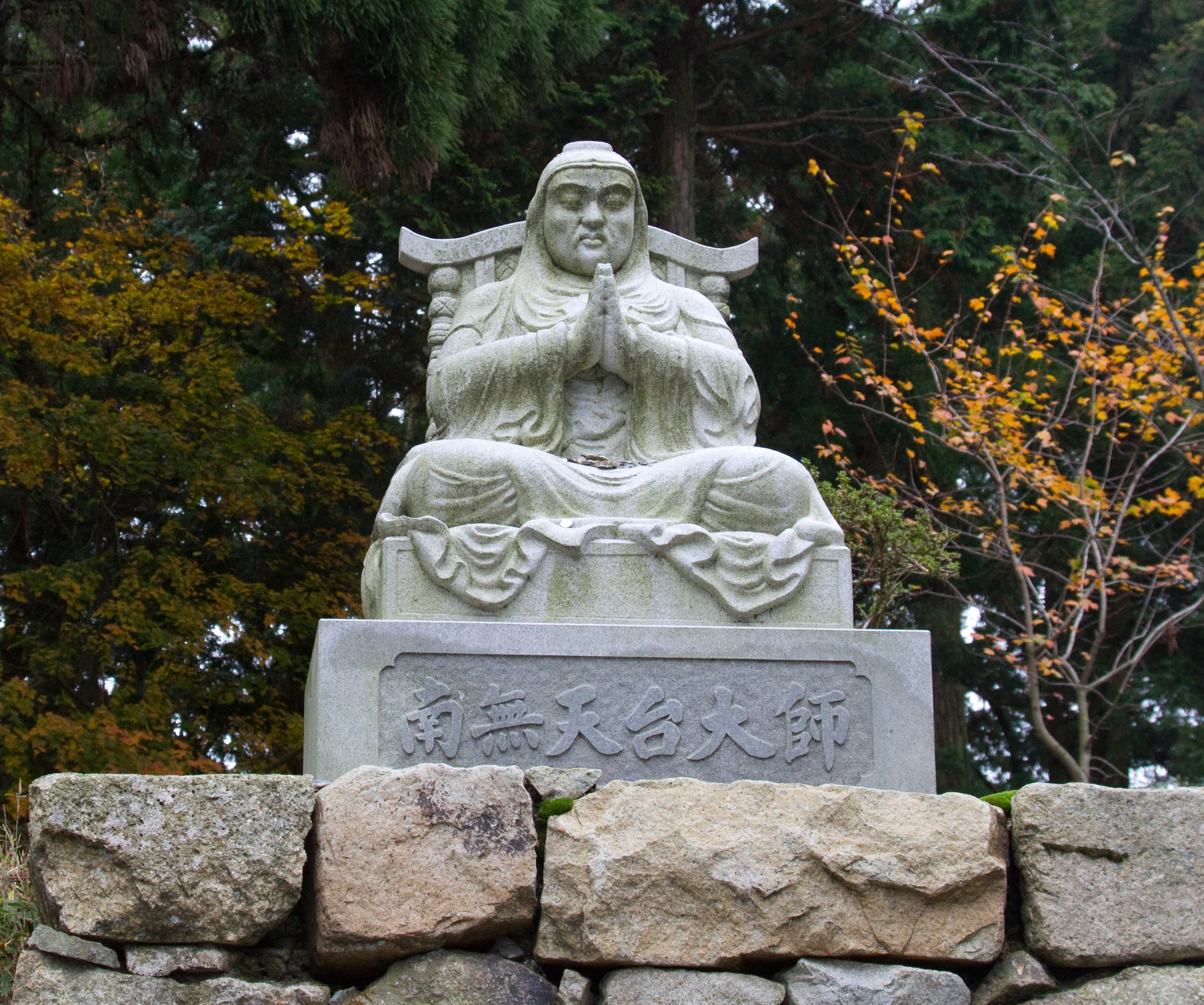
Statue of Zhiyi at the Tendai home temple of Enryaku-ji, Mount Hiei, Japan

The foundational underpinning of Zhiyi's system is his doctrine of the threefold truth (三諦; sandi), which is seen as the ultimate "Principle" or " the Nature". Zhiyi's doctrine represents a significant adaptation of Nāgārjuna's Madhyamaka philosophy. While Nāgārjuna's system centers on two truths—the conventional and the ultimate—Zhiyi expanded this framework by adding a third category: the Middle. This innovation helped bridge the gap between the apparent dichotomy in the two truths model, and offered a more integrated and holistic view of reality. Zhiyi writes that this idea can be directly found in two Chinese sutras, the Pusa yingluo benye jing (Taisho no. 1485) and the Benevolent Kings Sutra, which do mention (but do not explain) three truths. He also writes that all sutras contain the meaning of the three truths even if they do not use the term, and he cites numerous sutras like the Lotus and the Lankavatara's description of the triple body to illustrate the concept. (Note: Zhiyi cites the following passage from the Nirvana sutra to support his theory of the three truths: "To avoid the two extremes means: to avoid the extreme of existence, the passionate views of ordinary men, and to avoid the extreme of emptiness, the perception of no names and no marks by those in the two vehicles; to avoid the two extremes of the mundane truth and the real truth; to avoid the extremes of the worldly truth and the supreme truth; to avoid all of these extremes. This is called non-duality. The reality of non-duality is called the Middle...This is the enlightened perception of all Buddhas and bodhisattvas...therefore it is called the supreme truth of the Middle Path. It is also called the truth of one reality, and it is also called emptiness, the Buddha-nature, the Dharma realm, thusness, and the tathagatagarbha.")

Zhiyi's Threefold Truth schema can be explained as follows:

1. Emptiness (空; kong): This is the classic Mahayana teaching of Śūnyatā - fact that all phenomena lack inherent existence or self-nature (svabhāva). This corresponds to Nāgārjuna's ultimate truth, wherein all things are seen as empty due to their dependent origination.
2. Provisional or Conventional Existence (假; jia): Despite their emptiness, all phenomena appear and function within the realm of conditioned arising. They are also provisionally posited, and exist due to conceptualization (prajñapti), which also means that they are ultimately false. This reflects the mundane or conventional truth in Madhyamaka, which Zhiyi glosses as "the twelvefold conditioned co-arising of ignorance" and as "illusory existence". In Zhiyi's system, this teaching also corresponds to the various skillful means taught by the Buddha.
3. The Middle (中; zhong): This truth is the unity of emptiness and provisional existence. It emphasizes that reality is simultaneously empty and conventionally existent, i.e. the two truths are one truth. Emptiness is just conventionality, and vice versa, and both also contain the unity of these two (the third truth, which also contains them both). As Ziporyn writes "the difference between the first two truths, indeed even their opposition, must be preserved along with their harmony or identity." Zhiyi viewed this Middle Truth as transcending all dualistic extremes (such as existence and non-existence, being and emptiness, defilement and purity, self and other), and yet also affirming both sides of them as unified and non-contradictory. Zhiyi describes the Middle as "wondrous being identical to true emptiness." It can be explained as "a simultaneous affirmation of both emptiness and conventional existence as aspects of a single integrated reality." It is also described by Zhiyi as the "inconceivable" ultimate in which “any one [perspective] interfuses with all three, and the three, one”.

Zhiyi regarded these three truths as inseparable, emphasizing their mutual integration: each truth encompasses the others in a dynamic interplay rather than existing in isolation. One can only understand them as a whole, never apart. Zhiyi describes this as: "the perfect integration of the three truths: one-in-three, three-in-one" (三諦圓融一三三一; sān dì yuán róng yī sān sān yī). Each truth contains the other two. They are identical, three ways of saying the same thing. Thus, Zhiyi says "all dharmas are reducible to Emptiness, all are reducible to Provisional Positing, all are reducible to the Middle." Ziporyn writes that "any of these three concepts, if thought through to the end, reveals itself to be simply another way of stating the other two."

Regarding the classic Mahayana two truths theory itself, Zhiyi explains that it can be understood in at least seven ways, each one more profound than the other. At the deepest level, Zhiyi provides the following description (which also integrates the basic idea of the middle truth): "The mundane truth refers to both illusory existence and the identity of illusory existence with emptiness, and the real truth refers to the fact that 'reality includes existence, includes emptiness, and includes neither existence nor emptiness' (the threefold truth)."

The threefold ultimate reality is thus a single integrated whole. To describe this unified triple truth, Zhiyi used the simile of a drunk man who perceives the sun as spinning around, while in reality there is just one sun (a simile found in the Mahāparinirvāṇa Sūtra). According to Donner and Stevenson, the triple truth was also seen by Zhiyi as a tetralemma, which includes emptiness, and conventional existence, alongside the simultaneous affirmation and simultaneous negation of existence and emptiness. However, Zhiyi also warned that one must not cling to this idea of "one truth" either, since ultimately it is beyond all words and concepts. Thus, the single truth can also be described as "no truth": "the one truth is no truth; all truth is at rest. Each and every one is inexpressible. It is necessary to say "no truth" for the sake of those who have not fulfilled attainment, and in their attachments give rise to delusion. For those who have real attainment, there is [truth], for those vainly speculating, there is none."

Each aspect of the one truth has a corresponding contemplative aspect. This is known as the Threefold Contemplation (三观; sanguan) and is based on a passage from the Pusa yingluo benye jing (Taisho no. 1485):

1. Entering Emptiness from the Conventional (從假入空; zong jia ru kong): This practice begins by contemplating the dependent, conditioned nature of all phenomena, thereby discerning their emptiness of self-existence (svabhava). This corresponds to the contemplation of the two truths and aligns with the insight of arhats and bodhisattvas following foundational Buddhist teachings.
2. Entering the Conventional from Emptiness (從空入假; zong kong ru jia): Having recognized emptiness, one sees that emptiness is also empty and "re-enters" the conventional. This step reaffirms the practical, provisional existence of things (as interdependent arisings), enabling compassionate engagement with the provisional world. This corresponds to the wisdom of bodhisattvas in Mahayana teachings.
3. Contemplation of the Middle Way (中道第一義课; zhong dao di yi yi di): This practice harmonizes the previous two insights, transcending conceptual distinctions. Emptiness and existence are "simultaneously illumined and simultaneously eradicated". The middle reflects the wisdom of the Buddha and the ultimate teaching. It is a non-dual simultaneous contemplation of the two truths.

Zhiyi emphasized that the highest form of contemplation is "perfect and immediate calming and contemplation," where all three truths are perceived as a unified whole in a single instant of awareness. According to Zhiyi, "the supreme truth of the middle path" is "the reality of non-duality", as well as "the enlightened perception of all Buddhas and bodhisattvas", and is thus beyond all words and concepts, even though it can be called by various names like "Buddha-nature" (佛性; fóxìng), Thusness (tathātā, 如如; ruru), tathāgatagarbha (如来藏; rulaizang), and the Dharmadhatu (法界; fajie). In his commentary to the Vimalakirti Sutra, Zhiyi also glosses the contemplation of the middle as "the long-abidingness of phenomena (dharmas)" (法久住; fǎ jiǔ zhù, which can also mean the "enduring presence of the Dharma") which "infers the permanence of the Dharmakaya". He also states that the enduring presence of dharma/s "means to lead [beings] to realize buddha-nature and so to abide in the Great Nirvana".

According to Paul Swanson, Zhiyi's triune doctrine arose from the need to make explicit the relationship between the first and second truths of classical Indian Mahayana (an issue which also may have led to the development of Yogacara's "three natures"). Zhiyi developed his theory of a threefold truth by drawing on Nāgārjuna's Mūlamadhyamakakārikā, which explains the two truths as: "We state that whatever is dependent arising, that is emptiness. That is dependent upon convention. That itself is the middle path" (MMK, XXIV.18). Swanson also notes that various scholars have criticized Zhiyi for adding a third "truth", when no Indian author explains Madhyamaka this way. However, according to Swanson, the major point of Zhiyi's analysis is that reality is a single integrated truth (which may be explained with two or three aspects). As such, it is not a deviation from classical Madhyamaka. Swanson thinks that one of the main reasons for this development is that it was a useful device for undoing Chinese misunderstandings of the two truths (such as seeing them as referring to being and non-being, to two separate levels of reality or to an essential reality and its functions).

From the practical point of view, Ziporyn writes that the Tiantai threefold truth implies that all teachings and views can be ultimate, all can lead to liberation (depending on circumstances). Unlike with the earlier Buddhist theory of the simile of the raft, in which conventional truths are to be discarded upon awakening (as one no longer needs a raft after crossing a river), in the Tiantai model, conventional truths are the endowment of liberation and are not abandoned. Rather, they are fully mastered by bodhisattvas when they reach buddhahood in order to save all beings. Thus, conventional truths are not just the means to attain buddhahood but are also "the very content of buddhahood". As Ziporyn writes "ultimate truth is simply a name for the totality of conventional truths and the virtuosic mastery of being able to move unobstructed from one conventional truth to another, as the situation demands, to the comprehension of the way they fit together or can function together, or the way in which they are each, as it were, “versions” of the other. Ultimate truth is the non-obstruction between conventional truths, the fact that they all interpenetrate, that in their non-absoluteness each is simply a different way of saying what the others say."

=== The Sublime mutual inclusion ===
Zhiyi understood reality as a single integrated whole in which each part contains the whole. This is the doctrine of "mutual entailment" or mutual inclusion (互具; huju). This interfused holism has been described in different ways, such as "the interinclusiveness of the ten realms" or "the interpenetrating unity of all aspects of reality". According to Swanson, for Zhiyi "everything contains everything else, and the whole contains all things." For Zhiyi, the teaching of mutual inclusion is entailed by the three truths. This is because the third truth of the Middle transcends and includes all extremes, such as self and other, "inside" or "outside", whole or part, the one and the many. This means that any specific phenomenon (dharma) cannot be ultimately separate from all others and thus "entails" or includes all other phenomena in the universe or "is identical to the entire dharma-realm." This also means that each religious teaching or practice leads to and includes the entirety of Buddha's teaching, which is the sublime intent of the Lotus Sutra as understood by Zhiyi.

This holism is also another meaning of the term "wondrous" or "sublime" (miao) found in the title of the Sublime Dharma Flower Sutra. Common glosses of this term include "inconceivability", "beyond conceptual understanding," and even "miraculous". Swanson writes ''the gist of Zhiyi's standpoint is that the term 'subtle' (miao) refers to any teaching, doctrine, practice, and so forth, which includes the concept of unity or integration." Zhiyi explains this unified sublime reality thus:

If we speak of the non-differentiated dharma, where even the extremes are identical to the Middle, then there is nothing that is not the Buddha-dharma, all [that would be other] has been swept clean. How then could the Buddha-dharma be relative to or dependent on the Buddha-dharma itself? This Buddha is precisely the Dharma realm. Outside the Dharma-realm where is there any other dharma with which it can be compared and thereby given any determination? Compared to what would it be coarse? In contrast to what would it be marvelous? In this case there is nothing to be depended on or compared with, and also nothing broken off - not knowing what else to call it, we give it the forced-name, Absolute.

The absolute sublime reality is thus one which transcends all concepts, otherwise it would still be relative. In going beyond concepts and relations, it must also include all things and their opposites.

Zhiyi further explained this idea with the term "Three Thousand [Realms] in a Single Thought [/Moment]" (yīniàn sānqiān). Zhiyi states in a famous passage: "a single thought [literally, “one mind”] comprises ten dharma-realms." The ten realms are considered exhaustive of all cosmology, are: the hell, ghost, animal, asura, human, deva, sravaka, pratyekabuddha, bodhisattva and Buddha realms. Each of these states of existence can be experienced in one's own mind, understood as ways of seeing the world, as well as actual realms of existence one can be reborn in. While sentient beings experience a limited part of this interfused reality (and thus experience suffering), Buddhas see the whole, and respond to the needs of beings with skillful means (which are also partial) that lead them to the truth (of the whole).

According to this teaching, the ten realms of existence of Buddhist cosmology are all interconnected and interpenetrating. Furthermore each realm (or phenomenon) contains all others or "inherently entails" all others, hence they are "mutually inclusive" (in the same way that each of the three truths contain the others). Each thing or thought has a kind of potential which can be "opened up" to reveal all other things; every thing leads to everything else, and so "the whole is present in each part; every particular is itself the whole". Thus we can say that "one short thought contains all of reality" and "the Buddha and ordinary worldlings, body and mind, cause and effect, subject and object, sentient and non-sentient are mutually encompassed in every moment of thought." This does not mean that each phenomenon literally contains every thing else however, but that "as a sound is contained in a musical instrument", each phenomenon has the same nature (xing), which can lead to or become all other things. So, while we can say that all phenomena entail all other phenomena, they don't contain all phenomena pre-existent within it (a non-Buddhist view called satkaryavada which existed in India and is explicitly rejected in Tiantai).

Brook Ziporyn describes this view of reality which holds to the mutual inclusion of the whole in each individual thing as "ontological ambiguity" and as "omnicentric holism". For Zhiyi, given the vast web of contexts in the universe which define each phenomenon (dharma), no phenomenon has a clear singular identity of its own. Each thing is a nexus of all other things and exists in an inconclusive and infinitely multisided way. Furthermore, no single phenomenon is an exclusive core or center of reality, each and every phenomena is the center. This means that every phenomenon (dharma) in the universe is a skillful means of the Buddha, and a natural expression of Buddhahood. In spite of this, individual phenomena do not lose their individuality. It is precisely through their provisional individuality that they are able to function as skillful means leading to Buddhahood. Ziporyn compares this to how the setup of a joke can be both serious by itself and funny (in the context of the whole joke and its punchline). An important implication of this teaching is that, for Zhiyi, one does not overcome suffering by seeking to destroy it, but by seeing it within the context of the whole universe, and by seeing it as non-dual with the bliss of Buddhahood.

=== The inconceivable mind ===
While reality is a unified whole, it can be explained in different ways according to Zhiyi, such as through the schemas of the Three Subtle Dharmas (sentient beings, Buddha and mind) and the Ten Suchnesses to explain the various realms and how they have the same nature of the threefold truth. Regarding the Three Dharmas, Zhiyi quotes from the Avatamsaka Sutra which states: "there is no distinction between the mind, Buddha, and sentient beings." Since the Three Dharmas are non-dual and the mind is the most accessible of the three, one can contemplate the whole of reality, including Buddhahood itself, by contemplating one's own mind.

Zhiyi explains this by citing another passage from the Avatamsaka Sutra which states that "if one disports one's mind in the dharmadhatu (all of reality) as if in space, then one will know the objective realm of all Buddhas." According to Zhiyi one can understand this in terms of the threefold truth:

The dharmadhatu is the middle. Space is emptiness. The mind and Buddhas are conventional existence. The three together are the objective realm of all Buddhas. This means that if one contemplates [the thoughts of] one's mind, one can become endowed with all Buddha-dharmas.

Zhiyi also calls the single reality "the inconceivable mind" (不思議心 pu ssu i hsin), which contains all three thousand dharmas and the threefold truth. However, this "inconceivable mind" must not be understood as a kind of idealism in which reality arises from a single pure mind (a concept which would become influential in later Chinese Buddhism, especially in Zen). While this model presents a certain kind of non-duality, it emphasizes the ontological primacy of the "one mind" as pure and true, while perceiving worldly phenomena as illusory by-products of deluded consciousness. Zhiyi, however, proposed a different interpretation of Mahayana non-dualism. He rejected the idea that phenomena arise from an original mind or foundational consciousness. Instead, he described a relationship beyond vertical causation (mind generating phenomena) or horizontal containment (all things existing within mind). As Zhiyi writes:

Were the mind to give rise to all phenomena, that would be a vertical [relationship]. Were all phenomena to be simultaneously contained within the mind, that would be a horizontal [relationship]. Neither horizontal nor vertical will do. It is simply that the mind is all phenomena and all phenomena are the mind...[This relationship] is subtle and profound in the extreme; it can neither be grasped conceptually nor expressed in words. Therefore, it is called the realm of the inconceivable.

Zhiyi's view reinterprets the world not as a mere realm of delusion, but as one with enlightenment itself, the “real aspect of all dharmas”. Thus, Buddhist practice is not about returning to a supposed original purity but about awakening to wisdom directly within the complexities of ignorance and worldly experience.

=== Classification of teachings ===
In order to provide a comprehensive framework for Buddhist doctrine, Zhiyi sometimes described the various Buddhist teachings into the five types or "five flavors" of the teaching, each suitable for certain types of beings. This classification schema (panjiao) is based on a passage from the Nirvana Sutra which compares five phases of the teachings to the extraction of ghee from milk. Zhiyi also uses another simile: the sun's progression throughout the day. These five teaching flavors are:

- Huayan Period: Corresponding to the Buddha's enlightenment, this stage is represented by the early morning sun illuminating only the mountain peaks and by fresh milk. It highlights the ultimate and "sudden" teaching of the Huayan Sutra, which is supreme, but hard to understand by most.
- Tripiṭaka Period: Representing the Buddha's teachings on the foundational doctrines of the Small Vehicle, like impermanence and the Four Noble Truths. It is the first of the gradual teachings. This stage is likened to the sun reaching the valleys, and is also compared to cream.
- Vaipulya Period: During this period, the Buddha emphasized gradual Mahāyāna teachings and criticized earlier Small Vehicle doctrines. It corresponds to the sun shining on the plains, where objects cast shadows according to their shapes. It is further compared to curds.
- Prajñāpāramitā Period: This stage focuses on the doctrine of emptiness, aimed at practitioners across the Three Vehicles. It is compared to adults enduring the bright midday sun, while children may be blinded by it. Zhiyi compares it to butter. It is the last of the gradual teachings.
- Lotus and Nirvāṇa Period: Representing the culmination of the Buddha's teaching in the Lotus and Nirvana sutra, this period reveals the ultimate purpose and complete picture of all earlier teachings. It is "perfect/complete/round" because it integrates all teachings and also transcends them. It is what leads to the “inconceivable liberation” (acintya-vimokṣa, 不思議解脫; busiyi jietuo). This teaching is symbolized by the sun at its zenith, where no shadows are cast, as well as by ghee.

Later Tiantai figures would draw on the work of Zhiyi to develop the more extensive system of the "Five Periods and Eight Teachings." Japanese scholars like Sekiguchi Shindai have shown that this more developed system is the work of Zhanran and that Zhiyi never uses the term "Five Periods and Eight Teachings", though he does describe the other sets of categories (to a lesser extent), but never as part of a single system. All these various categories would be later systematized by Zhanran.

In his Profound Meaning of the Lotus Sutra, Zhiyi explains that there are three categories of teachings: the sudden teaching (realizing the truth all at once), the gradual teaching (a step by step set of teachings) and the variable (which takes sudden or variable methods as needed).

Zhiyi also describes "four teachings" (四教) which arise from and actualize the three contemplations:

- The Tripitaka Teachings (藏教; zàngjiào) which represents the Hinayana teachings on the four noble truths, renunciation and attainment of arhatship. Zhiyi writes that these teachings rely on entering emptiness "through the analysis of provisional existence," and remains incomplete as it relies on the duality between existence and emptiness.
- The Shared Teachings (通教; tōngjiào) which emphasizes the understanding of emptiness through "experiencing provisional existence (as empty)", a principle that applies across all Buddhist paths. It prepares practitioners for deeper Mahayana insights but is not itself complete, since it relies on mere negation and is thus only a partial truth.
- The Distinct Teachings (别教; biéjiào) which are exclusively Mahayanist and rely on "entering provisional existence from emptiness." This teaching establishes the middle truth, but this is an "Exclusive Middle" (但中; danzhong), a middle which transcends (but does not include) the previous teachings, and also includes "non-emptiness". Thus it is "distinct" or "separate". In this teaching, spiritual progress unfolds gradually through fifty-two bodhisattva stages, which are distinct and require the cutting off of the defilements. It also lacks the full integration of the Complete teaching, since it does not include within it the Hinayana for example or evil persons like Devadatta. Despite reaching the middle truth, its methods are seen as somewhat cumbersome due to reliance on gradualism and dualism.
- The Complete/Round Teaching (圆教; yuánjiào) which directly reveals the complete ultimate truth "all at once" without reliance on provisional methods. This is the holistic truth of the “Non-exclusive Middle” (不但中; budan zhong) which includes all the four teachings within it. It also corresponds to the third contemplation, and to the ultimate meaning of the One Vehicle, presenting the middle truth in an immediate and comprehensive manner, as opposed to all the other teachings which are “partial” (偏; pian). Intended for bodhisattvas with the sharpest spiritual faculties, the complete teaching is regarded as the most profound and all-encompassing. It includes even the actions of evil persons like Devadatta (as taught in the Lotus Sutra). In this teaching, each stage of the path includes all other stages. Furthermore, in the Round Teaching, one "cuts off the defilements by not cutting them off" (bu duan er duan). The Mohe Zhiguan sets out to explain the Dharma from this perspective.

In spite of these classification schemes, Zhiyi did not see the various classes of teaching as necessarily hierarchical, since each one had the same intent of the One Vehicle and thus had its own role to play in the Buddha's Dharma. The Lotus teachings are only superior from the relative point of view (since it communicates the ultimate intent of the Buddha directly), but from the ultimate perspective (the absolute sublime), all the flavors and teachings are the same as the Complete teaching.

=== Buddhahood ===
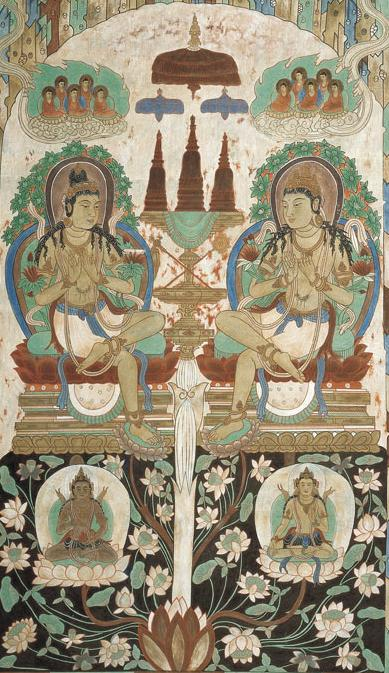
A scene from the Lotus sutra, the Buddhas Prabhutaratna and Shakyamuni seated in the jeweled stupa, painting from Yulin caves, seventh to fourteenth centuries.

In his Profound Meaning of the Lotus Sutra , Zhiyi explains Buddhahood by means of three ways of understanding the causes for Buddhahood and three ways of understanding the result of Buddhahood. The three ways of understanding the causes (which are really three ways of saying the same thing) are: (1) the truth of Three Thousand Realms in One Thought; (2) the fact that all realms other than Buddhahood contain Buddhahood; (3) all realms are of the nature of the threefold truth. The three ways of understanding the result of Buddhahood itself are: (1) Buddhahood pervades the entire universe as the nature of reality; (2) the inconceivable lifespan of the original Buddha who has always been Budha; (3) Buddha manifests in limitless forms for the benefit of all beings.

Therefore, according to Zhiyi, the Buddha-realm is deeply integrated with all other aspects of reality, inseparable from all things:

How can there be any dharma distinct from the Buddha? There cannot. All of the hundred realms and thousand suchnesses are the objective realm of the Buddha.

Buddhahood is not detached from the rest of reality, but pervades all the other nine realms and dwells within them. The difference is that a Buddha knows reality as it really is. As such, the three subtle dharmas (sentient beings, Buddhas and mind) are interfused, a single whole in which the three dharmas "are not distinct" as the Avatamsaka says.

Zhiyi also developed the Chinese Buddhist theory of “eliciting and responding” (感應; ganying, or "sympathetic resonace"), which is a uniquely Chinese theory of how Buddhas and bodhisattva relate to sentient beings. According to Zhiyi, sentient beings, through their devotion and their suffering, elicit or stimulate the Buddhas and bodhisattvas, who respond or resonate with skillful means. This relationship is possible because of the threefold truth, which means that sentient beings and Buddhas are at once distinct and also non-dual. Thus, in his "Profound Meaning of Guanyin" (觀音玄義; Guanyinxuanyi), Zhiyi writes that "we must speak of the eliciting and the response as neither one nor different". For Zhiyi, there is an inconceivable unity and difference (and both, and neither), in the relationship between beings and Buddhas due to the principles of equality and non-dwelling. This means that Buddhas are in the minds of all beings, and at the same time, all beings are in the minds of the Buddhas and bodhisattvas. This interfusion is true because beings and buddhas are ultimately not fixed to any single identity (non-dwelling), and are equally distributed, omnipresent and all-pervasive (equality).

=== Buddha-nature ===
Zhiyi's view of the key Mahayana doctrine of buddha-nature (佛性; foxing, the inner Buddha potential within all beings) integrates ideas from the Lotus, Nirvana and Vimalakīrti sutras, with his understanding of the threefold truth. According to Swanson, Zhiyi's view of Buddha-nature is "an active threefold process which involves the way reality is, the wisdom to see reality as it is, and the practice required to attain this wisdom".

Zhiyi's Profound Meaning of the Lotus Sutra explains Buddha-nature through three non-dual aspects:

- Practice, which is Buddha-nature as the conditional causes of Buddhahood: Swanson explains this as the ability to practice the Dharma, the "inherent potential and propensity for Buddhahood within all sentient beings which allows them to practice and build up the proper causes and conditions for attaining Buddhahood." It is associated with the conventional truth, with the ādāna-vijñāna (maintaining consciousness) and with the nirmanakaya.
- Wisdom, which is Buddha-nature as the complete cause of Buddhahood: This is the inherent wisdom in all sentient beings, the wisdom that can destroy delusion and reveal the true nature of reality. It is the presence of awakened wisdom which just needs to be uncovered. It is associated with the truth of emptiness, with the alaya-vijñāna and with the sambhogakaya.
- True Nature, which is Buddha-nature as the direct cause of Buddhahood: This means that all beings are endowed with "the reality of true thusness", i.e. they all "participate in the true nature of reality" and as such have the unlimited innate potentiality to become Buddha, a being of limitless wisdom. It is associated with the middle truth, the amala-vijñana (stainless consciousness) and with the Dharmakaya.

Zhiyi also quotes the Nirvana Sutra which says that "Buddha Nature is ... both one and not one, neither one nor not one." For Zhiyi, Buddha-nature is "one" because all beings are included in the One Vehicle, and it is "not one" because there are provisionally many dharmas (phenomena). Furthermore, buddha-nature is neither one nor not-one, neither a fixed unity nor fixed diversity.

Ng Yu-Kwan uses the term "Middle Way–Buddha Nature" to describe Zhiyi's thought, arguing that this concept positively expresses a view of Suchness or Dharmata, the ultimate reality, that transcends the understanding of Madhyamaka (which focuses on apophatic negation). Yu-Kwan argues that Zhiyi saw the emptiness and Madhyamaka teachings (which is classified under the "shared" teaching by Zhiyi) as less complete than the "Round" teaching of the Lotus Sutra, because Madhyamaka tended to be "negative, static, and transcendent". Zhiyi states in his Profound Meaning of the Lotus Sutra that the teaching of emptiness "fails to expound the permanence of buddha-nature." Furthermore, as Zhiyi writes in the Profound Meaning of the Lotus Sutra, by "eradicating clinging to emptiness", one speaks of "no-emptiness", and thus:

Those of sharp faculties say that no-emptiness is a wondrous existence (miao yu), and so teach no-emptiness. Those of sharpest faculties, upon hearing somebody speak of no-emptiness, say that it is the tathagatagarbha, and that all dharmas move toward the tathagatagarbha.

The view of "Middle Way–Buddha Nature" is found in Zhiyi's Profound Commentary on the Vimalakīrti Sūtra which states that "what is called liberation is the realization of the Middle-Way Buddha-nature," while seeing the emptiness teaching of the shared doctrine as a "one sided principle".

Zhiyi's positive account of buddha-nature (which he also describes as "no-emptiness", 無空; wukong), includes the doctrine of emptiness, but goes beyond it in affirming permanence and dynamic function. In contrast to the view of mere emptiness, Yu-Kwan argues that Zhiyi "takes Buddha Nature to be ever-abiding, functional, and all-embracing. Consequently, the characteristics of the Truth for Chih-i are permanency, dynamism, and all-embracing nature". Yu-Kwan sees Zhiyi's understanding of buddha-nature as being defined by three characteristics: ever-abidingness (常住; cháng zhù), meritorious function (功用; gōng yòng) and embracing various dharmas (具诸法; jù zhū fǎ). Ever-abiding refers to permanence, that nature which is unchanging (i.e. Dharmakaya). It is a non-physical and indestructible vajra body.

Yu-Kwan highlights Zhiyi's understanding of the truth as dynamic function (yong) as the most important aspect of buddha-nature for Zhiyi. Function or "great function without limits" means that ultimate truth is always positively and actively working for the transformation of sentient beings. In some cases, Zhiyi also qualifies Buddha-nature as "mind" (xin), with terms like "buddha-nature true mind", "self-nature pure mind" and "middle true principle mind", as well as statements like "Mind is the Buddha-nature". This understanding of buddha-nature in terms of mind highlights how it is a dynamic force in the world. Zhiyi also used other terms throughout his work such as sublime existence (miao-yu), empty buddha-nature. Regarding "embracing all dharmas", Zhiyi sees buddha-nature as inseparable from all phenomena and as contained within all phenomena (dharmas), even insentient things. Thus, Zhiyi writes "even a single color or smell is the middle way. The dharma of the middle way embraces all dharmas". This idea was later expanded into a full theory of "the Buddha-nature of the insentient" by Zhanran.

Swanson, however, is critical of Yu-Kwan's insistence on "Middle Way–Buddha Nature" as central to Zhiyi's system. He points out that this phrase appears less frequently in Zhiyi's primary texts than other terms like “the middle way,” “suchness,” or “ultimate emptiness.” Swanson questions Yu-Kwan's emphasis on truth as a permanent active agent, arguing that such a view risks imposing a dualistic structure on Zhiyi's thought. Instead, Swanson sees Zhiyi's view of truth as inseparable from phenomenal reality, best expressed through the threefold truth's integration of emptiness, conventionality, and the middle. Thus, Swanson sees Zhiyi as more in accord with orthodox Madhyamaka. Despite his criticism, Swanson acknowledges that Yu-Kwan's focus on Zhiyi's late commentaries on the Vimalakīrti Sūtra offers valuable insights, as these texts show a stronger emphasis on buddha-nature than Zhiyi's earlier works.

=== Inherent evil ===
Zhiyi's doctrine of "inherent inclusion as Reality" (性具實相; xing ju shi xiang) and the interfusion of the ten realms in one thought has a further implication that became central to Tiantai doctrine. This is the teaching that "the true nature includes good and evil" (性具善惡; xing ju shan e), also known as "inherent evil" (性惡; xing e). Unlike many other Buddhist traditions that understand Buddha-nature primarily as a pure, untainted basis for all phenomena, Tiantai posits that the ultimate inherently encompasses both good and evil. The idea that the true nature includes both good and evil is mentioned in the Method of Cessation and Contemplation in Mahāyāna (大乘止觀法門; Dasheng zhiguan famen), a 6th-century work which may have influenced Zhiyi.

Zhiyi critiqued as one sided the idea of a pure nature as the single source of all reality found in the Dilun school (which he termed “self-production”, zi sheng). He likewise critiqued the Shelun school idea that reality arises solely from defiled nature (which he termed “other-production”, 他生; ta sheng). Instead, Zhiyi argued for a view in which good and evil are both equally part of the same non-dual ultimate reality. This is a direct consequence of his argument that all phenomena are inherently included (本具; ben ju) in all other phenomena and that each of the ten realms contains all others. This interpenetration and mutual inclusion of all dharmas, regardless of whether they are considered good or evil, is a key characteristic of Reality in Zhiyi's view. Due to the interfusion of all phenomena, Zhiyi is thus able to affirm that “One thought of ignorance is the mind of dharma-nature” (念無明法性心; yi nian wu ming fa xing xin) and “afflictions are exactly bodhi (awakening).” Zhiyi writes in the Profound Meaning of the Lotus Sutra that "without evil there is no good. turning evil over is precisely the fulfillment of good.” Thus, the concepts of good and evil are relative, since each depends on the other. The complete teaching is the highest kind of good, and from this supreme understanding, samsara and nirvana are fully non-dual.

Zhiyi explicitly addresses the doctrine of inherent evil in works like the Mohe Zhiguan. According to Ziporyn, the locus classicus of the idea is in the Profound Meaning of the Guanyin. In this work, Zhiyi explains Buddha-nature through the lens of the Three Causes: Direct Cause (Suchness), Revealing Cause (wisdom), and Conditioning Cause (practices and merits). Zhiyi asserts that the Revealing Cause and Conditioning Cause aspects also include both good and evil, while distinguishing between inherent (性; xing) and cultivated (修; xiu) good and evil. Sentient beings who commit evil cut off cultivated good but retain inherent good. Buddhas cut off cultivated evil, but retain inherent evil. This signifies that inherent good and evil are fundamental aspects of buddha-nature that cannot be eliminated, since they are part of reality itself. Because of this, they can also serve as "Dharma-gates". Since even evil acts and defilements can lead one to Buddhahood in a certain way, Zhiyi writes that desires, anger, ignorance and the ten evil deeds can all be "seeds" of Buddhahood.

Furthermore, the distinction between Buddhas and evil sentient beings is not one of nature, but of cultivation. Thus, the nature shared by both also includes evil. Ultimately for Zhiyi, the buddha-nature shared by Buddhas and all beings is interfused with all dharmas, and thus must also encompass evil. Even though Buddhas do not give rise to cultivated evil, they can appear in evil forms as skillful means and enter the hells and so forth. Zhiyi cites the Vimalakirti sutra in defense of this view, which states "[When a bodhisattva] goes into the non-Dharma, [he] follows and understands perfectly the Buddha-Dharma," and also: "all kinds of afflictions are the seeds of the tathāgata". All of this does not mean that Zhiyi does not promote the cultivation of good or the abandoning of evil however. Rather it means that even the most evil of beings can also become Buddhas by contemplating their own evil (the three poisons) and developing it into good.

=== Buddhist practice ===
Zhiyi's vision of Buddhist practice is one which yokes together two complementary disciples: study of the teachings and meditative cultivation. These two are said to work together like two wheels of a cart or the two wings of a bird. As Zhiyi writes in a celebrated passage of the Mohe Zhiguan:

Understanding [that is, learning] purifies practice, and practice promotes understanding. Illuminating and enriching, guiding and penetrating, they reciprocally beautify and embellish one another. They are like the two hands of a single body, which, working together, keep it clean. [Yet this synthesis of learning and practice] is not just a matter of clearing away impediments and overcoming obstacles in order to inwardly advance one’s own enlightenment. One must also achieve a thorough comprehension of the sutras and treatises so that one can outwardly reveal to others what they have not heard before.

This understanding of the unity of "doctrine and practice" (教觀; jiao-guan) is compared to unbalanced and mistaken engagements with either element (the scholar who does not meditate, or the meditation (chan) master who does not study). He compares the unlearned meditator to someone who improperly grasps a fiery torch (samadhi), burning himself. The scholar who does not practice meanwhile, is compared to a pauper who counts someone else's money. For the Zhiyi and the Tiantai tradition in general then, Buddhist practice must integrate both if it is to be effect. This is obvious in the second step of the six identities, a classic schema for the Tiantai path, which includes “hearing the doctrine” and “acquiring verbal comprehension” of the perfect teaching. This understand is fleshed out in the third identity, in which meditative insight enlivens one's understanding.

The unity of doctrine and contemplation (教觀雙美; jiaoguan shuangmei) is also an aspect of the non-dual (不二; bu er) nature of the “round/perfect teaching” (圓教; yuanjiao) which integrates all elements of Buddhist practice, including mind-contemplation (觀心; guanxin) with conceptual understanding of scripture in a kind of loop or hermeneutic circle. For Zhiyi, the Buddha's Dharma, while ultimately being inconceivable and beyond all concepts and words, cannot be fully comprehended and expressed without knowledge of the Buddha's words in the sūtras and the words of the ancestors in the śāstras.

=== Calming and insight (zhiguan) ===
Zhiyi's works on meditation (chan, dhyana) and calming and insight (zhi-guan, śamatha-vipaśyanā, also translated as "cessation-and-contemplation") comprise the most systematic and extensive works on Buddhist meditation practice written in imperial China. Already in Zhiyi's Xiao Zhiguan, śamatha and vipaśyanā are said to be the most essential and foundational element of Buddhist pracitce, since "cessation is the preliminary gate for overcoming the bonds [of the afflictions], [and] contemplation is the proper requisite for severing delusions."

In the more mature Mohe Zhiguan, Zhiyi's understanding of the term zhi-guan (止観) is all encompassing, going beyond the traditional understanding which merely applies to specific aspects of meditation. For Zhiyi, zhi and guan include within it all Buddhist practices. In essence, Zhiyi writes, zhiguan "encompasses [all] dharmas." This is because zhi refers to the static aspects of Buddhist practice, all the ways of "stopping" and bringing to "cessation" negative qualities (like defilements and delusions), including ethics (sila), while guan refers to all dynamic aspects of wisdom (prajña) and insight which lead us to seeing reality clearly. Thus, the Xiao Zhiguan states: "There are many ways to enter the true reality of nirvana, but none that is more essential or that goes beyond the twofold method of cessation-and-contemplation."

Zhiyi's mature understanding of zhi-guan has a threefold aspect:

- Causal: The traditional understanding of the dual aspects of Buddhist practice in which śamatha (calming the mind or cessation of defilements and hindrances) and vipaśyanā (true seeing, insight or contemplation) are joined. Calming is like closing a room to keep out wind, insight is like lighting a lamp. For Zhiyi, a balance of the two must be maintained, "these two aspects are like the two wheels of a cart, or the two wings of a bird; if one side is cultivated disproportionately, then one falls prey to mistaken excess."
- Effect: This refers to the effects of all religious practices: they help calm and still the mind (and the afflictions), and they develop wisdom.
- Reality: Finally, Zhiyi also understands zhiguan as referring to ultimate reality itself, which has the nature of "quiescence and illumination" or "cessation and luminosity".

Swanson also writes that Zhiyi held that there are two modes of zhiguan: that of sitting in meditation 坐, and that of "responding to objects in accordance with conditions", which is further refined as abiding in the natural state of a calm and insightful mind under any and all activities and conditions. Thus, the term zhiguan can encompass all activities and actions. According to Swanson, Zhiyi preferred this more comprehensive term over the term "chan" (zen), which he saw as more limited.

When it comes to practical application of zhi-guan (cessation-contemplation), Zhiyi outlines three approaches to its cultivation:

- Gradual and successive zhi-guan: In which one progresses through various aspects of the path gradually, beginning with refuge and precept keeping, followed by dhyana and so forth, step by step.
- Variable (or undetermined) zhi-guan: Though it involves no particular predetermined stages, it may draw on or alternate the gradual and the sudden approaches to varying degrees, and the worldly or supreme perspectives, depending on an individual's needs.
- Perfect and sudden zhi-guan: the instant and direct contemplation of ultimate reality, the "real mark", "true aspect" (實相; shí xiàng) or "Dharmadhatu"

Zhiyi also emphasized the importance of balancing the dual aspects of cessation and contemplation, writing "these two aspects are like the two wheels of a cart, or the two wings of a bird; if one side is cultivated disproportionately, then one falls prey to mistaken excess."

=== Practicing zhiguan ===
The Mohe Zhiguan contains Zhiyi's discussion of how to actually practice the perfect and sudden zhi-guan in various skillful ways. This topic comprises most of the text of the Mohe Zhiguan. Zhiyi's extensive curriculum of practice is centered around four main sets of teachings: the "twenty-five skillful means," the "four samādhis" (四種三昧; sizhong sanmei), "ten objects of contemplation" (十境), and the "ten modes of contemplation" (十乘觀法).

The "twenty-five skillful means" are meant as supporting and preparatory practices. They include keeping the five precepts, being in a quiet place, moderation in eating, learning proper meditation posture, restraining the five senses and the five hindrances, meeting with spiritual friends (kalyānamitra) and avoiding disputes.

The four samādhis (here meaning meditative activity, but also "meditative absorption") are seen as a summary of all meditation practices. Zhiyi writes "there are many methods of practice, but we may summarize them under four sorts...By referring to them collectively as samādhis, we mean [that they] attune, rectify, and stabilize." Zhiyi also refers to them as the "supporting activity" for the contemplation of the Dharmadhatu (all of reality).

The four samādhis are:

- Constantly Seated Samādhi (常坐三昧; chángzuò sānmèi): Motionless sitting meditation in the lotus posture, focused on the ultimate truth, leaving the seat only for reasons of natural need. Traditionally this is supposed to be practiced for a period of 90 days in solitude. In this contemplation one contemplates all phenomena (dharmas) as containing the whole dharmadhatu (the whole of reality): "identify the objects of cognition with the dharmadhatu and rest your thought in the dharmadhatu alone."
- Constantly Walking Samādhi (常行三昧; chángxíng sānmèi): This practice entails mindful walking and meditating on Amitābha, while repeating the Buddha's name (nianfo). Traditionally it is also taught in a period of 90 days.
- Half-Walking Half-Seated Samādhi (半行半坐三昧; bànxíng bànzuò sānmèi): this includes two practices: Lotus Samādhi and Vaipulya Samādhi. The Vaipulya Samadhi involves numerous ritual acts, and contemplations, as well as recitation of dharanis from the Vaipulya Dharani Sutra (T.1339). The Lotus Samādhi is based on the Lotus Sutra, particularly the Samantabhadra Meditation Sutra, and includes penance, chanting, worship, visualization of Samantabhadra, meditation on the emptiness of all dharmas.
- Neither Walking nor Sitting Samādhi (非行非坐三昧; fēixíng fēizuò sānmèi): This includes "the awareness of [all] mental factors" (覺意) as they arise in the mind, in other words, "viewing the mind" (guanxin). It is also known as "the samadhi of following thoughts" and "the samadhi of awakening to the nature of thought." Thoughts must be seen as "not moving, not originated, not extinguished, not coming, not going". This practice should be applied not just in meditation, but in all of one's daily activities.

For Zhiyi, the four samadhis are all variations of "viewing the mind" (guanxin), which is none other than the "Buddha mind", since "it is via the mind that Buddhas attain liberation" and "your own mind contains the whole of the Buddha's teachings".

The "ten objects of contemplation" are listed as (1): the skandhas, āyatanas and dhātus; (2) the afflictions (kleśa); (3) illness; (4) karmic marks; (5) demonic forces; (6) dhyāna/samādhi; (7) false views; (8) overwhelming pride; (9) the śrāvaka and pratyekabuddha vehicles; (10) bodhisattva vehicle.

Each of these objects of contemplation is to be understood clearly through the "ten modes of contemplation". The most important element in this list is the first one, which covers the basic Buddhist analysis of experience. Zhiyi spends much more time discussing the skandhas (five aggregates), āyatanas (sense fields) and dhātus ("elements" of existence) than the other objects. He further explains that since the aggregates "all arise dependent on the mind", one should focus on contemplating the aggregate of consciousness (vijñana).

The "ten modes of contemplation" are ten ways of contemplating the ten objects. This schema of training begins with the most profound and sudden contemplation, and works its way downwards, inverting the traditional "gradual training", so that only the least talented practitioners need to work their way throughout the entire set. The ten modes are:

1. Contemplating mind as the inconceivable - This is the most important and fundamental contemplation, which also includes all modes within it (and indeed, all phenomena, even delusion). It is the contemplation of the enlightened ones who see true reality as perfectly interfused, as "one thought containing three thousands worlds" and as the threefold truth. A person with the sharpest faculties can rely on this mode alone, while other individuals might not attain liberation from their attempts at practicing it, in which case they would then need to practice the other modes.
2. Arousing compassionate thoughts: one arouses great compassion, bodhicitta (the intention to become a Buddha for the sake of all) and takes the bodhisattva vows. Incidentally, it is Zhiyi who developed the fourfold bodhisattva vows which are standard in East Asian Buddhism today (drawing them from various sutras).
3. Skillful means for easing one's mind: this refers to various methods for calming the mind, to be used as appropriate, depending on one's needs.
4. Thorough deconstruction of dharmas: deconstructing all phenomena, especially the afflictions and wrong views, thereby eliminating all attachments.
5. Knowing what eases and what obstructs the path: Involves discerning the appropriate or obstructed conditions in contemplative practice, distinguishing between beneficial and detrimental aspects of mental states.
6. Cultivating the steps to the path: the thirty-seven aids to awakening
7. Regulating through auxiliary methods: if obstructions to samadhi appear, one practices the six perfections, as well as the five antidotes: breath meditation, meditation on impurity, compassion meditation, dependent arising contemplation and Buddhanusmrti.
8. Knowing the stages: focuses on cultivating the five repentances: Repentance, Worship, Sympathetic Joy, Transfer of Merit, taking bodhisattva vows; as well as and five stages in their practice.
9. Peace through patient recognition: not letting oneself be moved by external conditions, good or bad.
10. Avoiding passionate attachment to dharmas: if one is unable to enter true reality by the above nine means, this means attachment is still strong.

=== Perfect and sudden contemplation ===
One of the most famous passages in the Mohe Zhiguan (which is often chanted in Tiantai temples and actually derives from Guanding's introduction) summarizes Zhiyi's view of the "perfect and sudden" (yuan-tun) aspect of zhiguan which does not rely on stages:

The perfect and sudden [method of practicing cessation-and-contemplation] involves taking the true aspects [of reality] as the object from the very beginning. Whatever is made to be the object [of contemplation], it is the Middle; there is nothing that is not truly real. [When one attains the state of contemplation wherein] reality itself (dharmadhatu) is fixed as the object, and one’s thoughts are integrated with reality itself, [one realizes that] there is not a single color nor scent that is not the Middle Way. It is the same for the realm of the individual [mind], the realm of the Buddha, and the world at large. All [phenomena] aggregates and senses are thusness; therefore there is no suffering that needs to be removed. Since ignorance and the exhausting dust [afflictions] are indivisible with bodhi-wisdom, there is no origin [craving] to be severed. Since the extremes and false views are [indivisible with] the Middle and the right [views], there is no path to be cultivated. Since samsara is nirvana, there is no extinguishing [of craving] to be realized. Since there is no suffering and cause, there is no mundane world; since there is no path and no extinction, there is no transcendent world. There is purely the single true aspects [of reality]; there are no separate things outside these true aspects. For things in themselves (dharmata) to be quiescent is called “cessation”; to be quiescent yet ever luminous is called “contemplation.” Though earlier and later [stages] are spoken of, they are neither two nor separate. This is called perfect and sudden cessation-and-contemplation.

This is thus a direct contemplation of the sublime (miao) and complete (yuan) ultimate reality, which includes everything, including seemingly opposite states like wisdom and delusion, samsara and nirvana, in a non-dual whole. This all-encompassing contemplation views our own nature as sentient beings as being fully integrated with the state of Buddhahood. As Kantor writes, for Zhiyi, "the unwholesome mode of profane existence necessarily embodies the sacred and thus serves as a form of inverse instruction. The unwholesome profane is inseparable from and inversely points to the wholesome, comparable to the nature of and relationship between pain and healing." This is described by phrases such as "the interpenetration of falsehood and the truth," and "ignorance is dharma-nature", which describe the fully integrated non-dual contemplation of all things within one moment of thought.

According to Zhiyi, the direct sudden approach which views all reality as a non-dual whole is also the "One Practice Samadhi" (ekavyūha Samādhi; 一行三昧) taught in the Mañjusri Prajñaparamita Sutra. This is also known as the "samadhi of oneness" or the "calmness in which one realizes that all dharmas are the same". It marks the state of perfect enlightenment. The term "Samadhi of Oneness" subsequently influenced later Chinese Chan (Zen) authors, such as Daoxin.

=== Non-elimination of defilements ===
According to Zhiyi, for those who have attained the ultimate perspective, "the mundane dharmas are themselves the ultimate Dharma...there is no need to forsake the mundane and adhere to the sacred". This identification of worldly phenomena with the ultimate reality and nirvana means that liberation is achieved in the phenomenal world itself, not apart from it. As such, liberation does not ultimately require the elimination of the defilements. This doctrine of the "non-elimination" (不斷; bù duàn) of defilements is expressed by Zhiyi in numerous ways throughout his works. For example, Zhiyi states that "defilements are awakening", "ignorance is wisdom", and "the realm of mara is the realm of Buddha". According to Zhiyi, Buddhas and bodhisattvas may skillfully employ defilements (while not being bound by them) to guide others, just like more fertilizer can create more flowers. Furthermore, if one truly realizes the empty illusory nature of defilements, they will have no hold on us, and so there is no need to actively work to destroy them. Zhiyi compares this to a person who has gained magical powers and can escape a prison without destroying it.

The fact that "the assemblage of defilements do not obstruct prajña and nirvana" is called the "inconceivable liberation". Zhiyi also argues that the ultimate Dharma-nature and defilements are two modes of the same reality, like water and ice. Since their difference is insubstantial, realizing their mutual inclusion in one pure non-dual thought is precisely what can allow us to transform ignorance into wisdom, like thawing ice into water. This view of the non-elimination of all dharmas also relates to Zhiyi's view of ultimate reality as "embracing all dharmas" and including all phenomena in a single thought. Non-elimination also supports the meritorious function of a buddha or bodhisattva, who could use any dharma in their manifestation of skillful means.

=== The Tiantai path ===
Zhiyi provides a classic schema of the Buddhist path called the six degrees of identity. These six main stages of realization are:

1. Identity in Principle (理即; Liji): All beings are inherently identical with the principle of reality (Tathāgata-garbha), regardless of awareness or practice. This is the stage of most common people, they are a Buddha but have no clue of it. Zhiyi compares this to a poor person who owns a house with buried treasure but is unaware of it.
2. Verbal Identity (名字即; Mingziji): Awareness arises through hearing or reading Buddhist teachings, representing conceptual understanding without deep practice. It is like a friend pointing out the treasure's location to the poor person, bringing awareness to what was previously unknown.
3. Identity in Practice (観行即; Guanxingji): At this stage, one engages in active contemplation and meditative practice aligned with Buddhist principles. It is like clearing away the weeds and starting to dig for the treasure.
4. Identity in Resemblance (相似即; Xiangsiji): Practice matures, and understanding increasingly resembles true wisdom; corresponds to the "Ten Degrees of Faith", the first ten of the fifty two bodhisattva stages taught in Zhiyi's system. This is like digging closer to the treasure, gradually nearing its discovery.
5. Partial Identity (分真即; Fenzhenji): Partial realization of Buddha's wisdom; begins with the first bhumi and extends to virtual enlightenment. It is compared to opening the treasure chest and seeing its contents.
6. Ultimate Identity (究竟即; Jiujingji): Complete enlightenment, marking the full realization of Buddha-nature and the eradication of ignorance. It is like fully retrieving and using the treasure, with nothing more to uncover.

This schema provides a gradual analysis of how, as we practice the path, we grow increasingly aware of own nature as Buddha. For Zhiyi, our understanding of our identity with the Buddha must be balanced. Those who exaggerate their own realization of identity become arrogant, while those who emphasize their difference to the Buddha lose faith in themselves and their practice.

In commenting on the "Description of Merits" chapter (17) of the Lotus Sutra, Zhiyi also outlines several different stages for the practitioner of the Sutra, known as "four stages of faith" and "five stages of practice". (Note: According to Lopez and Stone: "The four stages of faith are (1) to arouse even a single thought of willing acceptance (also translated as “a single moment’s faith and understanding”); (2) to understand the intent of the sūtra’s words; (3) to place deep faith in the sūtra and expound it widely for others; and (4) to perfect one’s own faith and insight. The “five stages of practice” are (1) to rejoice on hearing the Lotus Sūtra; (2) to read and recite it; (3) to explain it to others; (4) to practice it while cultivating the six perfections; and (5) to master the six perfections.")

For Zhiyi, the various stages of the path are not necessarily linear, since according to Guanding (Zhiyi's main disciple) "when you enter the first abode, one stage is all the stages...all are ultimate, all are pure, and all involve full mastery." This means that the actual attainment of Buddhahood, and the process of becoming a Buddha (the stages of the path) are inseparable. Since Buddhahood is atemporal, being and becoming a Buddha is beyond time and stages. Thus, awakening suspends any successive order in linear temporality, meaning that any stage on the path is non-dual with Buddhahood itself (just like the root teaching and the trace teaching of the Lotus Sutra are non-dual). The practice of the path and Buddhahood are “inconceivably one”, and thus, from an ultimate point of view, becoming Buddha and being Buddha are paradoxically the same thing.

Zhiyi also held that the path can be covered in three ways: suddenly, gradually, or in a variable manner (a combination of methods taught when appropriate). While he admits that insight can occur suddenly through practice for those beings of sharp faculties, Zhiyi remained modest about his own attainments and never claimed he had attained Buddhahood through even the "sudden and perfect" contemplation. Thus, while practice can have sudden results for some people in certain circumstances, this possibility is not central to Zhiyi's system (as it would become in Chan).

=== Repentance ===
Zhiyi was also an avid composer and performer of Buddhist repentance rites, which are a class of rituals in Buddhism that is typically performed in order to cleanse one's negative karma, purify the mind and generate merits. He wrote in great detail about the theory behind Buddhist repentance in his commentaries on the sūtras, even expounding a classification scheme for the different types of repentances. He also personally composed various repentance rites himself, which would later be extremely influential on the composition of other repentance rituals in later periods. One of the most famous repentance rituals he wrote was the Fahua Sanmei Chanyi (法華三昧懺儀, lit: "Lotus Samādhi Repentance Ritual"). Zhiyi wrote this ritual in order to promote the cultivation of the Lotus Samādhi, which refers to a type of samādhi that practitioners can attain through practice of the Lotus Sūtra. This type of samādhi was first developed by Nanyue Huisi (南嶽慧思, 515–577), who taught it to Zhiyi. The Fahua Sanmei Chanyi (Japanese: Hokke Zanmai Sengi) would receive edits in later periods, and in modern times, it is still practiced by contemporary Chinese Tiantai monastics, Japanese Tendai monastics as well as Korean Seon monastics. The name of the ritual is often shortened to the Fahua Sanmei Chan (法華三昧懺, lit: "Lotus Samādhi Repentance"), Chinese and Hokke Senbō (法華懺法, lit: "Lotus Repentance Method") in Japanese and Beophwa Sammae Chambeop (법화삼매참법, lit: "Lotus Samādhi Repentance Method") in Korean. Another influential repentance ritual he wrote was the Jinguangming Chanfa (金光明懺法, lit: "Method of Repentance of Golden Light"), which was based on the Golden Light Sūtra. This ritual would receive further supplementations during the Song dynasty (960–1279). According to Zhiyi, there are three types of repentance rituals:

- Communal repentance (作法懺悔): Solely for Buddhist monks and nuns who have violated any of their precepts, except the four parajika offenses which entail expulsion from the sangha. Usually held on the days of new and full moon or Uposatha, the precepts are recited according to the seven categories. At the end of each category, the Buddhist monks and nuns are expected to confess if they have violated any of the precepts; otherwise, they remain silent.
- Visionary or auspicious sign repentance (觀相懺悔): Can be practiced by both monastics and lay people, especially when lay people want to undergo ordination with the bodhisattva precepts of the Brahmajāla Sūtra. For monastics, the bodhisattva precepts are transmitted last as part of their ordination. This type of repentance is usually performed in order to receive the bodhisattva precepts or for purification purposes if a monastic or lay person has violated any of their precepts, except the five grave offenses. This type of repentance is conducted is by focusing the mind and thought and seeing various signs with a pacified mind; it is usually performed in a mental state of meditation. Many Āgama sūtras teach repentance by way of contemplating signs such as hells, poisonous snakes, the white mark (between the eyebrows) and others. Many Mahāyāna dhāraṇī methods of practice also have this kind of repentance rite.
- Unborn or markless repentance (無生懺悔 or 無相懺悔): Cultivation of this form of repentance mostly entails giving rise to bodhicitta, having compassion for all sentient beings, and deeply examining the source of transgression to see that all dharmas, including the nature of one's transgression or offense, is itself empty and has no one to cling to. According to both Zhiyi and the Chan Patriarch Huineng, this form of repentance could eradicate innumerable eons of past major transgressions. Zhiyi provides several reasons for the nature of transgressions being empty: Firstly, all phenomena are originally empty of inherent existence, and it is sentient beings' unwholesome thinking and false attachments to the conditioned that give rise to the three poisons of ignorance, greed and aversion, which causes them commit countless transgressions. Secondly, the mind itself is ultimately empty of inherent existence. With neither seeing the mind nor seeing non-mind, there is nothing to contemplate and no contemplator, no object and no subject. Thirdly, the fundamental nature of transgressions is empty of inherent existence. This is because the mind and phenomena are empty, and so the transgressions that come about due to wrong attachment to conditioned phenomena are also empty in nature.

== Contribution to Chinese medicine ==
Zhiyi's writings also show a deep understanding of traditional medical knowledge. His works incorporates Traditional Indian Buddhist medicine, with Chinese folk and Daoist medical knowledge.

For example, Zhiyi makes use of Indian medical systems based on the "four great elements" (四大) along with Chinese theories of the "five internal organs" (五藏) to explain the nature of different diseases and their causes. He also discusses various treatment methods such as herbal remedies, meditation to calm the mind (止心), six qi therapy (六气治病法), twelve-breath therapy (十二息治病法), and the recitation of mantras.

Ultimately, for Zhiyi, these medical practices were seen as supporting the ultimate goal of Buddhism, the contemplation of the mind.

== See also ==
- Guoqing Temple
- Zhou Jichang

== Primary sources in translation ==
- The Essentials of Buddhist Meditation by Shramana Zhiyi. Translated by Dharmamitra. Kalavinka Press. 2008. ISBN 978-1-935413-00-4.
- The Great Calming and Contemplation. Translated by Donner, Neal; Stevenson, Daniel B. Honolulu: University of Hawai‘i Press. 1993.
- The Profound Meaning of the Lotus Sutra: T'ien-t'ai Philosophy of Buddhism. Vol. I and II. Translated by Shen, Haiyan. Delhi: Originals. 2005. ISBN 8188629413.
- Clear Serenity, Quiet Insight: T'ien-t'ai Chih-i's Mo-ho chih-kuan. Translated by Swanson, Paul L. UH Press. 2018.
- A Study and Translation on the Kuan-hsin-lun of Chih-i (538-597) and its Commentary by Kuan-Ting (PDF). Translated by Tam, Wai Lun. Hamilton, Ontario: McMaster University. 1986. Archived from the original on 24 May 2015.
- "Ten Doubt about Pure Land by Dharma Master Chi-I (T. 47 No. 1961" ( (PDF)). Pure Land Buddhism - Dialogues with Ancient Masters. Translated by Thich Tien Tam. NY: Sutra Translation Committee of the United States and Canada & Buddha Dharma Education Association. 1992. pp. 19–51. Archived from the original on 1 February 2014.

== Secondary sources ==
- Buswell, Robert Jr; Lopez, Donald S. Jr., eds. (2013). Princeton Dictionary of Buddhism. Princeton, NJ: Princeton University Press. ISBN 9780691157863.
- Chappell, David W. (1987). "Is Tendai Buddhism Relevant to the Modern World?" (PDF). Japanese Journal of Religious Studies. 14 (2–3): 247–266. doi:10.18874/jjrs.14.2-3.1987.247-266. Archived from the original on 24 October 2013.
- Chappell, David Wellington (2013). "A Guide to the Tiantai Fourfold Teachings". In Kubo, Tsugunari; Abbott, Terry; Ichishima, Masao; Chappell, David Wellington (eds.). Tiantai Lotus Texts. Berkeley, California: Bukkyō Dendō Kyōkai America. pp. 153–210. ISBN 978-1-886439-45-0.
- Dumoulin, Heinrich (1993). "Early Chinese Zen Reexamined ~ A Supplement to 'Zen Buddhism: A History" (PDF). Japanese Journal of Religious Studies. 20 (1). doi:10.18874/jjrs.20.1.1993.31-53. Archived from the original (PDF) on 4 March 2009.
- Dumoulin, Heinrich (2005). Zen Buddhism: A History. Vol. 1: India and China. Translated by Heisig, James W.; Knitter, Paul. World Wisdom. ISBN 978-0-941532-89-1.
- Fa Qing (30 August 2013). The Śamatha and Vipaśyanā in Tian Tai (PDF). Poh Ming Tse Symposium 2013: One Master Three Meditative Traditions. Singapore. pp. 30–47. Archived from the original (PDF) on 24 May 2015.
- Hurvitz, Leon (1962). Chih-i (538–597): An Introduction to the Life and Ideas of a Chinese Buddhist Monk. Mélanges Chinois et Bouddhiques XII. Bruxelles: Institut Belge des Hautes Études Chinoises.
- Kantor, Hans-Rudolf (2002). "Contemplation: Practice, Doctrine and Wisdom in the Teaching of Zhiyi (538-597)". Inter-Religio. 42: 21–37.
- Lopez, Donald S.; Stone, Jacqueline I. (2019). Two Buddhas Seated Side by Side: A Guide to the Lotus Sūtra. Princeton University Press.
- Ma, Yungfen (2011). The Revival of Tiantai Buddhism in the Late Ming: On the Thought of Youxi Chuandeng (1554- 1628) (PDF) (Ph.D.). Columbia University.
- Ng, Yu-Kwan (1993). T'ien-t'ai Buddhism and Early Madhyamika. Tendai Institute of Hawaii Buddhist Studies Program. Honolulu: University of Hawaii Press. ISBN 9780824815608.
- Rhodes, Robert (2012). "The Development of Zhiyi´s Three Contemplations and its Relation to the Three Truths Theory" ( (PDF)). Conference Papers: Tiantai Buddhist Thought and Practice. Taipei: Huafan University. pp. 312–357. Archived from the original on 17 May 2015.
- Swanson, Paul L. (1989). Foundations of T'ien-T'ai Philosophy. California: Asian Humanities Press. ISBN 0-89581-919-8.
- Swanson, Paul L. (2002). Ch'an and Chih-kuan: T'ien-t'ai Chih-i's View of "Zen" and the Practice of the Lotus Sutra (PDF). International Lotus Sutra Conference on the theme "The Lotus Sutra and Zen", 11–16 July 2002. Archived from the original (PDF) on 10 July 2007.
- Stevenson, Daniel B. (1986). "The Four Kinds of Samādhi in Early T'ien-t'ai Buddhism". In Gregory, Peter N. (ed.). Traditions of Meditation in Chinese Buddhism. Vol. 1. Honolulu: University of Hawaii Press. pp. 45–98. ISBN 0-8248-1088-0.
- Shen, Haiyan; Nasoraia, Brikha H. S. (17 June 2017). "On Tiantai Zhiyi's Theory of the Three Categories of Dharma". Fudan Journal of the Humanities and Social Sciences. 11 (2). Springer Science and Business Media LLC: 237–256. doi:10.1007/s40647-017-0183-x. ISSN 1674-0750. S2CID 256393493.
- Ziporyn, Brook (2000). Evil and/or/as the Good: Omnicentrism, Intersubjectivity, and Value Paradox in Tiantai Buddhist Thought. Leiden, The Netherlands: Harvard University Asia Center. doi:10.1163/9781684170340. ISBN 9781684170340.
