= Innumerable Meanings Sutra =

Sutra in Mahāyāna Buddhism

The Innumerable Meanings Sutra also known as the Immeasurable Meanings Sutra and Sutra of Infinite Meanings (Sanskrit: अनन्त निर्देश सूत्र, Ananta Nirdeśa Sūtra; Chinese: 無量義經; pinyin: Wúliángyì Jīng; Japanese: Muryōgi Kyō; Korean: Muryangeui Gyeong) is a Mahayana Buddhist text. According to tradition, it was translated from Sanskrit into Chinese by Dharmajātayaśas, an Indian monk, in 481, however Buswell, Dolce and Muller describe it as an apocryphal Chinese text. It is part of the Threefold Lotus Sutra, along with the Lotus Sutra and the Samantabhadra Meditation Sutra. As such, many Mahayana Buddhists consider it the prologue to the Lotus Sutra, and Chapter one of the Lotus Sutra states that the Buddha taught the Infinite Meanings just before expounding the Lotus Sutra.

== Title ==
For Buddhists, the term "Innumerable Meanings" or "Infinite Meanings" is used in two senses. The first, used in the singular, refers to the true aspect of all things, the true nature of all forms in the universe. The second sense, used in the plural, refers to the countless appearances or phenomena of the physical, visible world. All of these countless appearances are brought forth by the one true, pure world – the true aspect of all things (the one true Dharma of "nonform").

== Outline of the Sutra ==
=== Virtues ===
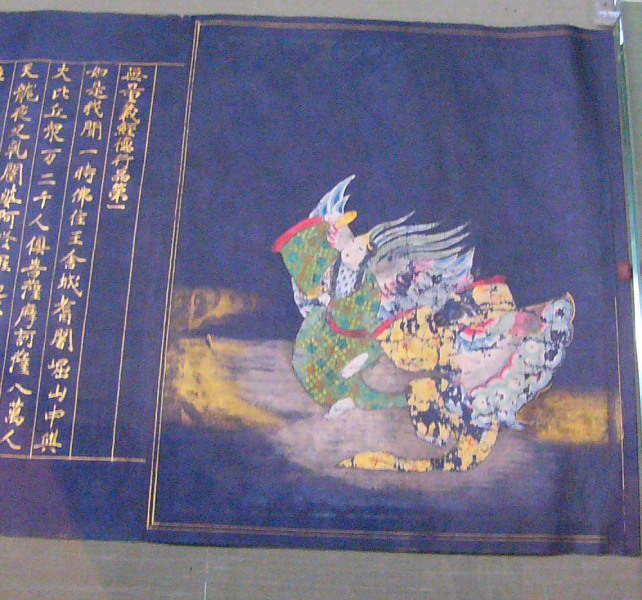
The Innumerable Meanings Sutra, gold, colour on blue paper, 13-14th century, Japan

This is the first chapter of the Innumerable Meanings Sūtra. It begins with the Buddha who is staying at the City of Royal Palaces on Mount Gṛdhrakūṭa, or Vulture Peak, with a great assemblage of twelve thousand bhikṣus (monks), eighty thousand bodhisattva-mahāsattvas, as well as gods, dragons, yakṣas, spirits, and animals. Along with all these beings were bhikṣuṇīs (nuns), upāsakas (male laymen), upāsikās (female laymen), kings, princes, ministers, rich people, ordinary people, men and women alike.

The Bodhisattvas are thus called mahāsattvas in the Threefold Lotus Sutra, because they have a great goal of obtaining supreme enlightenment (bodhi) and finally attaining Buddhahood by enlightening all beings. This chapter is called "Virtues" simply because all the beings in the assembly, no matter what "state" they were in, desired to praise the Buddha for his virtues (the precepts, meditation, wisdom, emancipation, and knowledge of emancipation) and excellence. In doing so, they could sow their knowledge of the Buddha deep into their minds.

=== Preaching ===
In this chapter, the Buddha addresses the Great Adornment Bodhisattva and the other eighty thousand bodhisattvas in the assembly and explains to them that this sutra makes unawakened bodhisattvas accomplish perfect enlightenment "quickly". If a bodhisattva wants to learn and master this doctrine of Innumerable Meanings, he "should observe that all [phenomena] were originally, will be, and are in themselves void in nature and form; they are neither great nor small, neither appearing nor disappearing, neither fixed nor movable, and neither advancing nor retreating; and they are nondualistic, just emptiness."

In order to realize naturally what may emerge from all laws in the future, one must first penetrate and understand them deeply. By realizing this, one can realize that all laws remain settled for a vast number of eons, but even after a vast amount of time, they change.

=== Ten Merits ===
The essence of this chapter is the urgent advice to master and practice the teaching of the sutra for the spiritual merit to be gained from it, the good life it leads to, and the usefulness to mankind and the world that it makes possible. Mentioned earlier in this sutra, the teachings of the Buddha are the truth of the universe. It is no wonder, and certainly no miracle, that if one lives according to the truth, his life works out well.

Once again, Great Adornment Bodhisattva is present in the assembly and questions the Buddha about where the teaching comes from, its dwelling place, and what purpose it serves. The Buddha answered and said that the teaching originates in the innermost mind of all the buddhas; its purpose is to propel the minds of all man-kind to seek the wisdom of the buddhas; its dwelling place is in the performance of the Bodhisattva Path by all who seek perfect enlightenment.

== See also ==
- Mahayana sutras
- Sutra of Meditation on the Bodhisattva Universal Virtue
- Tiantai
