= Prabhutaratna =

Buddhist figure in the Lotus Sutra

Prabhūtaratna
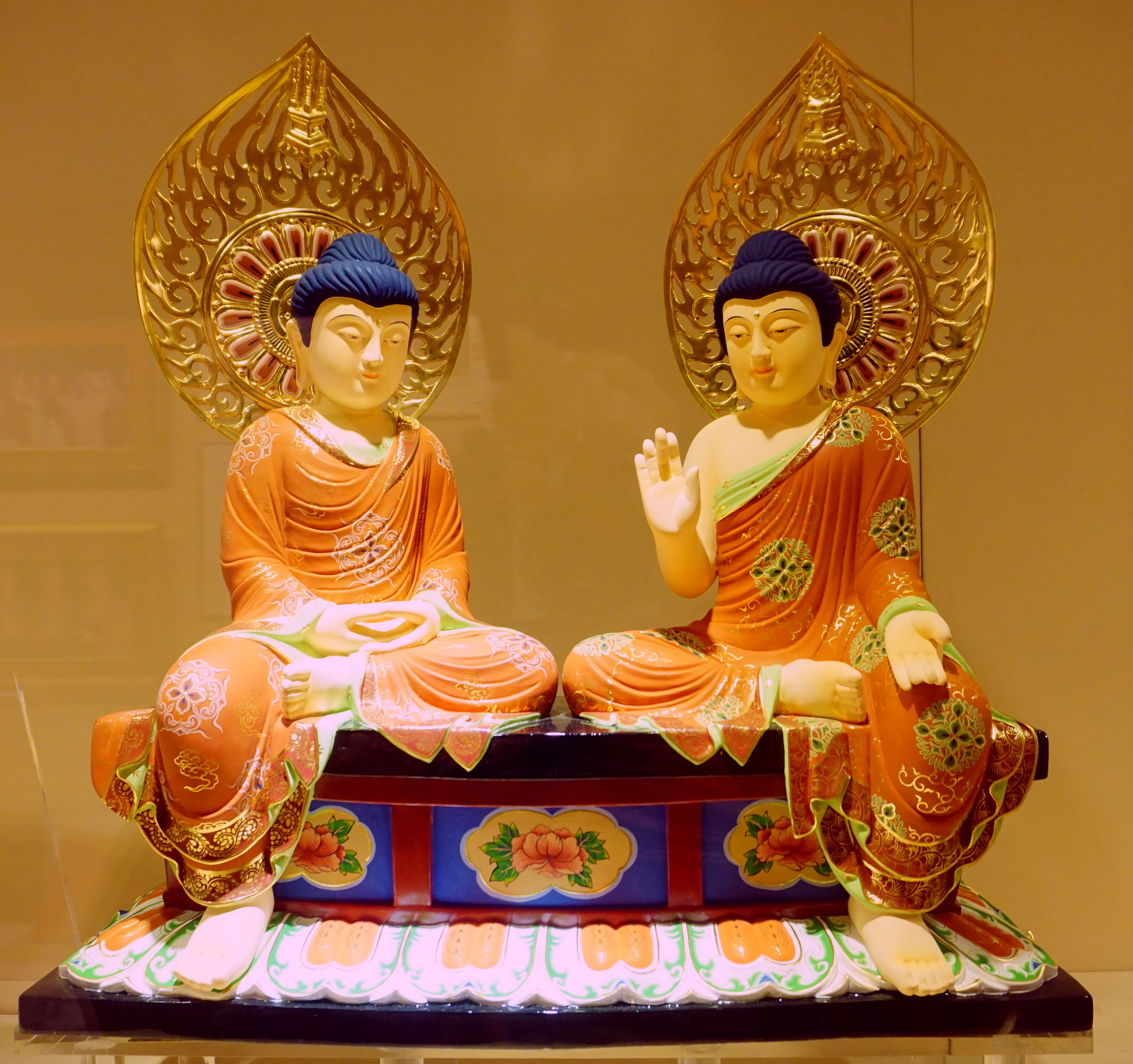
- Prabhūtaratna and Shakyamuni; statue, Buddha Tooth Relic Temple and Museum, Singapore
- Sanskrit: प्रभूतरत्न; Prabhūtaratna
- Chinese: 多寶如來 (Pinyin: (Duōbăo Rúlái)
- Japanese: 多宝如来(たほうにょらい) (romaji: Tahō Nyorai)
- Korean: 다보여래 (Hanja: 多寶如來) (RR: Dabo Yeorae)
- Thai: พระประภูตรัตนะ
- Tibetan: རིན་ཆེན་མང་ Wylie: rin chen mang
- Vietnamese: Đa Bảo Phật; Đa Bảo Như Lai

Information
- Venerated by: Mahayana, Vajrayana
- Attributes: Witness to the Lotus Sutra

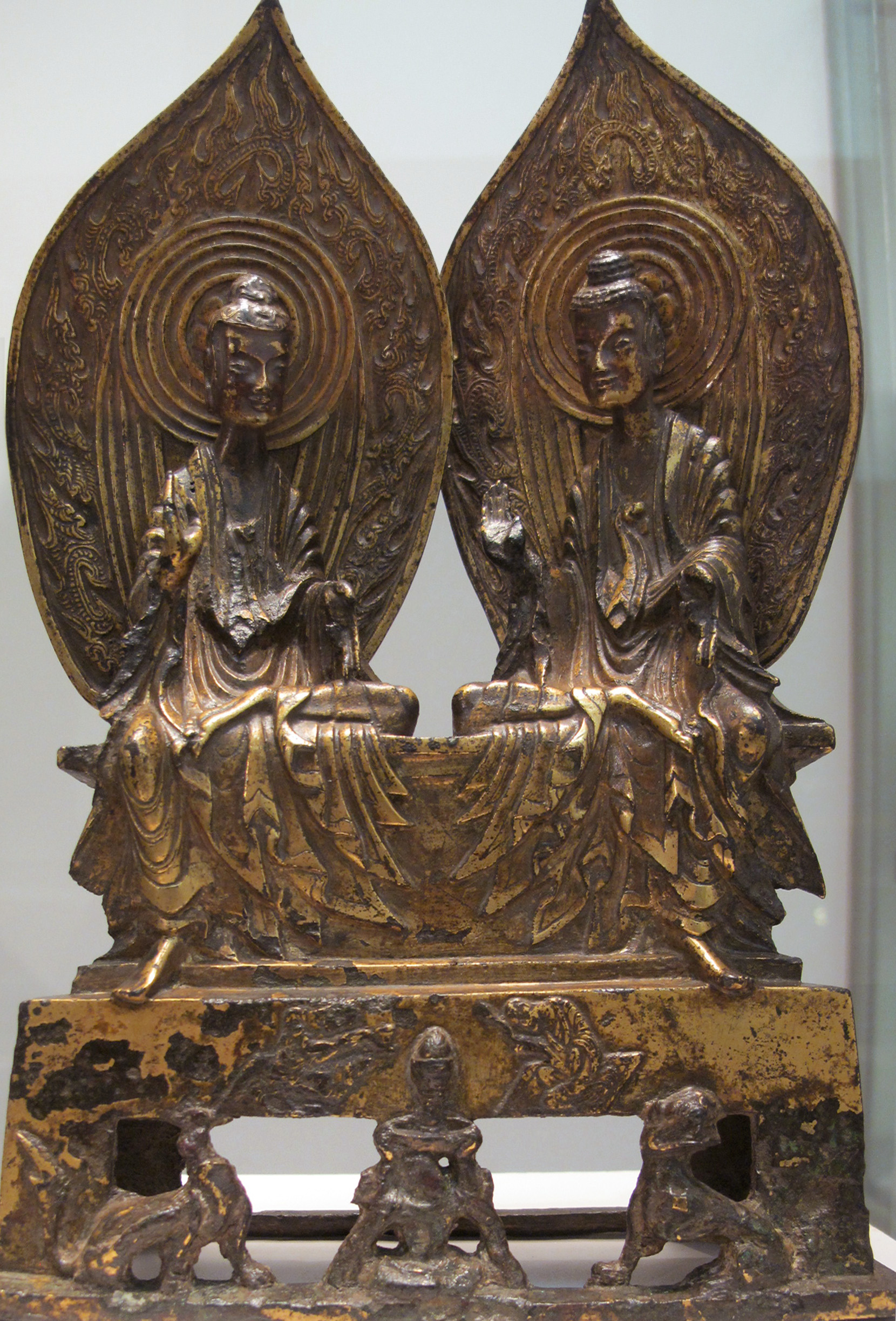
Prabhūtaratna and Shakyamuni in the jeweled stupa; stele, dated 518 CE, Northern Wei. Guimet Museum

Prabhūtaratna (Skt: प्रभूतरत्न; Traditional Chinese: 多寶如来 or 多寶佛; Simplified Chinese: 多宝如来 or 多宝佛; pinyin: Duōbǎo Rúlái or Duōbǎo Fó; Japanese romaji: Tahō Nyorai or Tahō Butsu), translated as Abundant Treasures or Many Treasures, is the Buddha who appears and verifies Shakyamuni's teachings in the Lotus Sutra and the Samantabhadra Meditation Sutra.

== In the Lotus Sutra ==
In the 11th chapter of the Lotus Sutra, Prabhūtaratna is described as living in a land "tens of millions of billions of countless worlds to the east" called "Treasure Purity.". Here he resides within a stupa translated variously as the "Precious Stupa," the "Treasure Tower," the "Jeweled Stupa," or the "Stupa of the Precious Seven Materials." Prabhūtaratna is said to have made a vow to make an appearance to verify the truth of the Lotus Sutra whenever it is preached in the present or future.

In the chapter, as Shakyamuni is preaching, Prabhūtaratna's stupa arises from under the earth and hangs in midair. It is of unimaginable height and length. Traditionally stupas were edifices where relics of Buddhas are stored. Those gathered to hear Shakyamuni preach at Vulture Peak assumed the stupa from below the earth would contain relics. Instead, it contained within a living Prabhūtaratna who verified the truth of the teaching.

"Great-Eloquence Bodhisattva" wants to see the Buddha in the stupa but Prabhūtaratna's vow makes it a prerequisite for showing his body that the Buddha who proclaims the Lotus teaching collects all his manifestations. At this point Shakyamuni summons from around the universe countless Buddhas who are his emanations, lifts the entire assembly into the air, and opens the stupa. Prabhūtaratna praises Shakyamuni and invites him to sit next to him. Shakyamuni then continues to preach the Dharma. In the 22nd "Entrustment" chapter of the Lotus Sutra, Prabhūtaratna and his stupa return to under the earth.

== Interpretations ==
According to Nichiren, in their interaction Shakyamuni and Many Treasures agreed to the perpetuation of the Law throughout the Latter Day.

Nikkyō Niwano states Prabhūtaratna's stupa symbolizes the buddha-nature which all people possess, while the springing-up of the stupa from the earth is said to imply the discovery of one's own buddha-nature.

According to The Princeton Dictionary of Buddhism, "Prabhūtaratna (Many Treasures) invites Shakyamuni to sit beside him inside his bejeweled stūpa, thus validating the teachings Shakyamuni delivered in the scripture." Thich Nhat Hanh states that Prabhūtaratna symbolizes "the ultimate Buddha" and Shakyamuni "the historical Buddha"; the two Buddhas sitting together signifies the non-duality of the ultimate and the historical, that at a given moment in the real world, one can touch the ultimate.

Akira Hirakawa argues that "the union of the eternal nature of the dharma (Prabhutaratna Buddha) and the eternal nature of the Buddha (Sakyamuni Buddha) is symbolized in the two Buddhas seated together inside the stupa."

== Applications ==
The scene of Prabhūtaratna and Shakyamuni Buddhas sitting together in the Treasure Tower has been the theme of much Buddhist art over time. Nichiren also placed Prabhūtaratna on the Gohonzon, his calligraphic representation of the Treasure Tower.

== See also ==
- Dabotap
- Tahōtō
- Threefold Lotus Sutra
- Eternal Buddha

== Bibliography ==
- Eckel, Malcolm David (1994). To See the Buddha: A Philosopher's Quest for the Meaning of Emptiness. Princeton University Press. pp. 81–83. ISBN 0-691-03773-6.
- Silk, Jonathan (2006). Body Language: Indic Śarīra and Chinese shèlì in the Mahāparinirvāna-sūtra and Saddharma-pundarīka. Studia Philologica Buddhica Monograph Series XIX, Tokyo: The International Institute for Buddhist Studies
