= Ten realms =

Buddhist cosmology

Translations of Ten Realms
- English: Ten Realms, Ten Worlds
- Sanskrit: दस धातवः (IAST: dasa dhātavaḥ)
- Chinese: 十界 (Pinyin: shíjiè)
- Japanese: 十界 (Rōmaji: jikkai)
- Korean: 십계 (RR: sib-gye)
- Tagalog: Dasa dhatabah
- Vietnamese: thập giới

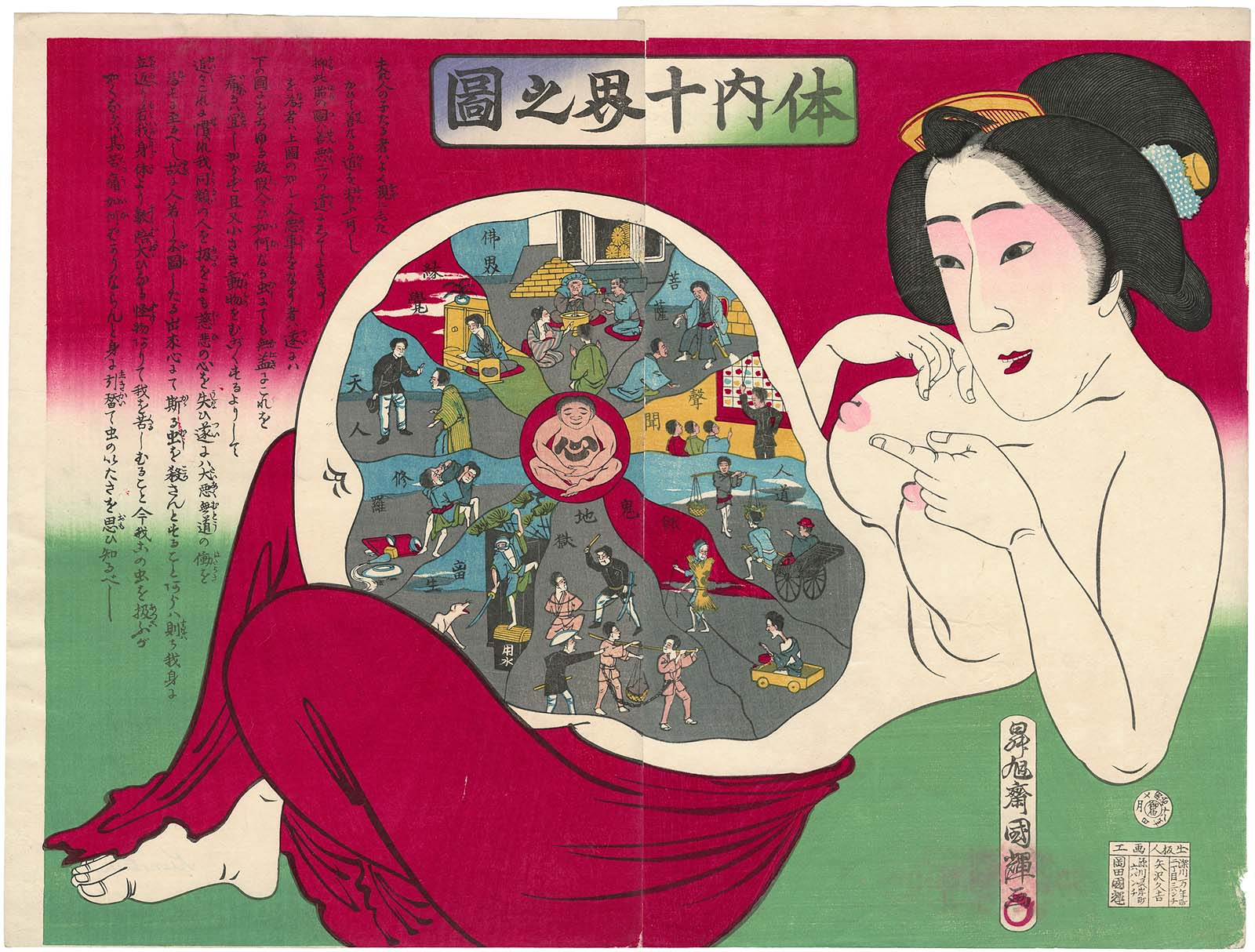
Japanese depiction of the ten realms

The ten realms, sometimes referred to as the ten worlds, are part of the belief of some forms of Buddhism that there are 240 conditions of life which sentient beings are subject to, and which they experience from moment to moment. The popularization of this term is often attributed to the Chinese scholar Chih-i who spoke about the "co-penetration of the ten worlds."

== The Ten Realms ==
The ten realms are part of Buddhist cosmology and consist of four higher realms and six lower realms derived from the Indian concept of the six realms of rebirth.

These realms can also be described through the degrees of enlightenment that course through them. They have been translated in various ways. They are divided into the Six Realms (六道), followed by higher states of enlightened consciousness that lead to final Buddhahood. The Six Realms are: Hell (地獄道), the Hungry Ghosts or pretas (餓鬼道), the Beasts (畜生道), the Titans or Asuras (修羅道), Humans (人道) and lastly Heaven, or the realm of the gods (天道). Above these lie the four holy states: the Śrāvaka (声聞), the Pratyekabuddha (縁覚), the bodhisattva (菩薩) and finally completely enlightened Buddhahood.

In some systems of cosmology these states are perceived as distinct realms in which the inhabitant has to experience various forms of suffering in order to expiate karma. In Japanese syncretic practices the ten realms are seen as distinct trials of discipline a practitioner must encounter or overcome in order to reach a material or spiritual goal.

However, according to Chih-i's conceptualization of "three thousand realms in a single moment of life," they are not separate physical realms into which one may be reborn but interrelated realms of consciousness, each of which is contained within each other (Jp. jikkai gogu). The Ten Realms are a conceptualization of the Lotus Sutra's worldview of the interconnected relationship of phenomena, the ultimate reality of the universe, and human agency.

== Three thousand realms in a single moment ==
Each of the ten realms or worlds are contained within each realm, the "mutual possession of the ten realms" (Jap. jikkai gogu). The one subsequent hundred worlds are viewed through the lenses of the Ten suchnesses and the three realms of existence (Jpn. san-seken) to formulate three thousand realms of existence. These hundred aspects of existence leads to the concept of "three thousand realms in a single moment (Jap. Ichinen Sanzen)."

According to this conception, the world of Buddha and the nine realms of humanity are interpenetrable, there is no original "pure mind," and good and evil are mutually possessed. This establishes a proclivity to immanence rather than transcendency. According to Nichiren the three thousand realms in a single moment is practical and realizable in this lifetime in the concrete world.

== Significance ==
In some Japanese traditions the ten realms are experienced in pilgrimages to a series of temples or sites along holy mountains.

More frequently, the theory of the ten realms and its larger associated concept of three thousand realms of existence in a single moment portray a non-theistic interpretation of how a person is affected by the cosmos and, in turn, has the potential to impact on the cosmos. In some schools of Nichiren Buddhism practitioners believe the calligraphic scroll Gohonzon is Nichiren's representation of the ten realms and chanting Nam Myōhō Renge Kyō to it activates the Buddha's attributes of wisdom, courage, and compassion.

== See also ==
- Realms of rebirth
- Six realms of samsara
- Nine Worlds

== Sources ==
- Causton, Richard: "Buddha in Daily Life, An Introduction to the Buddhism of Nichiren Daishonin", Random House 2011. ISBN 1446489191 (Chapter: "The Ten Worlds", pp. 35–95)
- Harada, Sekkei (2008). The Essence of Zen: The Teachings of Sekkei Harada. Wisdom Publications. pp. 97–101. ISBN 978-0-86171-533-6.
