= Threefold Lotus Sutra =

The Threefold Lotus Sutra (Chinese: 法華三部經, pinyin: Fǎhuá Sānbù Jīng, rōmaji: Hokke Sambu Kyo) is the composition of three complementary sutras that together form the "three-part Dharma flower sutra":

1. The Innumerable Meanings Sutra (無量義經 Ch: Wúliàngyì Jīng, Jp: Muryōgi Kyō), prologue to the Lotus Sutra.
2. The Lotus Sutra (妙法蓮華經 Ch: Miàofǎ Liánhuá Jīng, Jp: Myōhō Renge Kyō) itself.
3. The Sutra of Meditation on the Bodhisattva Universal Virtue/Samantabhadra Meditation Sutra (普賢經 Ch: Pǔxián Jīng, Jp: Fugen Kyō), epilogue to the Lotus Sutra.

They have been known collectively as the Threefold Lotus Sutra in China and Japan since ancient times.
