= Samantabhadra Meditation Sutra =

Sutra in Mahāyāna Buddhism

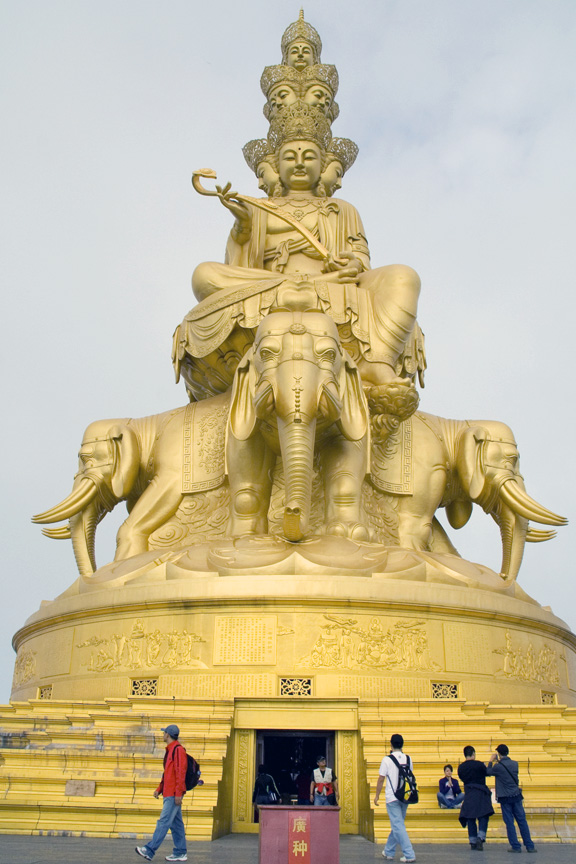
Statue of Samantabhadra Bodhisattva on Mount Emei, with his six-tusked elephants.

The Samantabhadra Meditation Sūtra (traditional Chinese: 觀普賢菩薩行法經; simplified Chinese: 观普贤菩萨行法经; pinyin: Guān Pǔxián Púsà Xíngfǎ Jīng; Japanese: 観普賢菩薩行法経; rōmaji Kan Fugen Bosatsu Gyōhō Kyō; Vietnamese: Kinh Quán Phổ Hiền Bồ Tát Hạnh Pháp; Korean: 관보현보살행법경; Gwan Bohyeon Bosal Haengbeop Gyeong), also known as the Sūtra of Meditation on the Bodhisattva Universal Virtue, is a Mahayana Buddhist sutra teaching meditation and repentance practices.

The extant Chinese text of the meditation sutra was translated by Dharmamitra between 424 and 442 CE (T09n277). The Samantabhadra Meditation Sūtra is often included in the so-called "Threefold Lotus Sutra," along with the Lotus Sutra and the Innumerable Meanings Sutra. It is not known, however, when or by whom the sutra was first recited, but it is considered by many Mahayana sects to be a continuation (an epilogue) of the Buddha's teachings found within the Lotus Sutra. This sutra is believed to have followed two earlier translations, including one by Kumarajiva, which are now lost; no original Sanskrit translation has been found.

== Samantabhadra Bodhisattva ==
According to the sutra itself, Samantabhadra Bodhisattva ("Universal Virtue") was born in the east Pure Wonder Land and whose form was already mentioned clearly by the Buddha in the Avatamsaka Sutra. In the Threefold Lotus Sutra, the chapter preceding the Samantabhadra Meditation Sūtra, chapter 28 of the Lotus Sutra, describes Samantabhadra as a perfect example of an adherent to the four practices:

- He practices the teachings of the Lotus Sutra.
- He protects the Dharma teachings from every kind of persecution.
- He witnesses the merits obtained by those who practice the teachings and the punishments of those who slander the Dharma or persecute the practitioners.
- He proves that those who violate the Dharma can be delivered from their transgressions if they are sincerely penitent.

In the Meditation Sutra, the Buddha describes Universal Virtue's body as unlimited in size, and the range of his voice and the forms of his image are also described as unlimited. He possesses divine powers that enable him to come into the world when he wishes and shrink down to a smaller size. Through his wisdom-power, he appears transformed as if mounted on a white elephant to the people of Jambudvīpa defiled by the three heavy hindrances: Arrogance, envy, and covetousness. The Buddha Shakyamuni describes in detail the form of the elephant on which Universal Virtue is mounted.

Universal Virtue rides the white elephant for the sole purpose of guiding the people of Jambudvīpa, or the sahā-world, through practices that are associated with their environment. The bodhisattva riding on his white elephant is a symbolic image of Buddhist practice, as well as a representation of purity. The purity of the six sense organs is represented by the six tusks of Universal Virtue's white elephant.

It is undeniable that the Meditation Sutra is a continuation of the Lotus Sutra, because the sutra itself testifies to the "Dharma Flower Sutra" three times.

== Meaning of Repentance ==
The denotational meaning of the word "repentance" in a general sense, is the confession or remorse of one's own past physical and mental misdeeds, or transgressions. When we repent, we purify our minds and we free ourselves from a sense of sin, and we feel greatly refreshed. Psychoanalysts have applied this principle in helping many people who are mentally afflicted.

=== Contemplation of Reality ===
In Japan, the text is also called the Repentance Sutra (Japanese: 懺悔經; Rōmaji: Sange-kyō). The second chapter of the Lotus Sutra explains in detail the concept of Tathātā, or "Suchness". The sutra emphasizes repentance by means of meditating on "the true aspect of reality" and the "Vaipulya sutras."

The essence of Buddhist repentance is summed up in the following lines from the verse spoken by the Buddha concerning the purification of the six sense organs:

The ocean of impediment of all karma
Is produced from one's false imagination.
Should one wish to repent of it
Let him sit upright and meditate on the true aspect of reality.
All sins are just as frost and dew,
So wisdom's sun can disperse them.

== See also ==
- Innumerable Meanings Sutra
- Lotus Sutra
- Mahayana sutras
- Nichiren Buddhism

== Sources ==
- Kato, Bunno (1993). The Threefold Lotus Sutra (PDF). Tokyo: Kosei Publishing Company. p. 348. ISBN 4333002087. Archived from the original (PDF) on 2013-10-19.
- Niwano, Nikkyo (1976), Buddhism For Today: A Modern Interpretation of the Threefold Lotus Sutra (PDF), Tōkyō: Kōsei Publishing Co., ISBN 4-333-00270-2, archived from the original (PDF) on July 22, 2013
- Reeves, Gene (2008). The Lotus Sutra: A Contemporary Translation of a Buddhist Classic. Somerville: Wisdom Publications. ISBN 978-0861715718.

== Bibliography ==
- Shinjo Suguro, Nichiren Buddhist International Center, trans. (1998): Introduction to the Lotus Sutra, Fremont, Calif.: Jain Publishing Company. ISBN 0875730787; pp. 203-218
