= Hanshan and Shide =

Popular figures in Zen painting

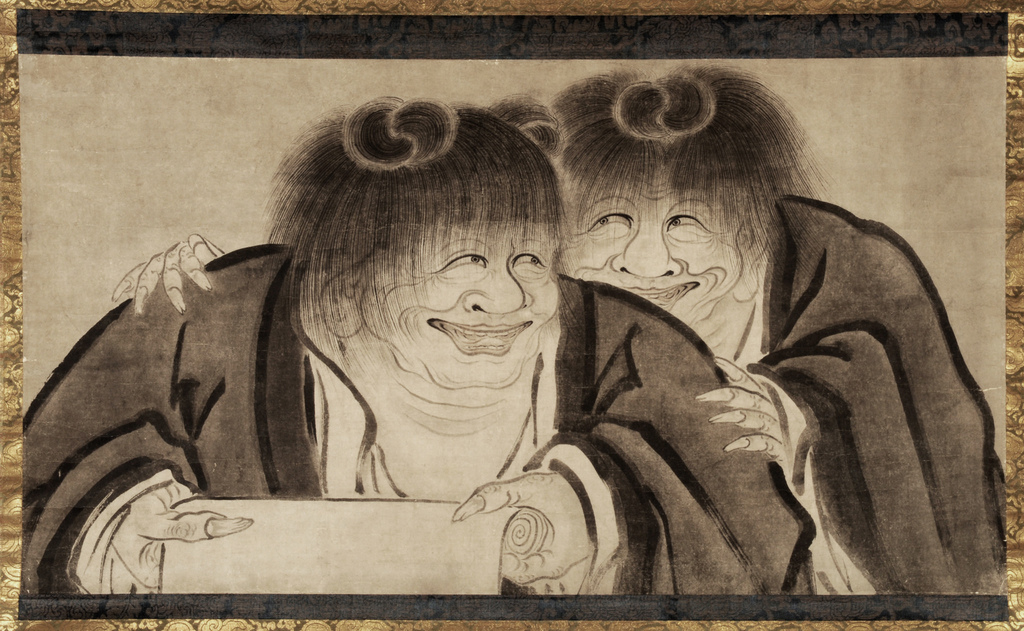
Kanzan and Jittoku by Sesshū Tōyō. Japan, Muromachi period, 15th century

Hanshan and Shide (Japanese: Kanzan and Jittoku) are popular figures in Zen painting who have been depicted many times as a pair, and the duo is a motif in Zen painting and representative of deeper meanings in Zen Buddhism as a whole. Hanshan, whose name means "Cold Mountain," is believed to be an eccentric Zen poet from the Tang Dynasty (618–907) who lived on the Tiantang Mountain in Zhejiang Province. Shide, whose name means "foundling" or "pickup," was a kitchen worker at the nearby Guoqing Temple. He is said to have been abandoned by his family, and then found and raised by Fenggan, another Zen eccentric. As legend goes, the two formed a close friendship, with Shide stealing scraps from the kitchen to bring to Hanshan, and the pair spending time in nature, away from societal structure and institutions. Little is verified about the lives of these two figures, and they "have come to exist only in the works they have left behind."

Hanshan and Shide are easily recognizable in Zen painting. They are almost always depicted wearing scrappy and ratty clothing, appearing disheveled, wandering in nature, laughing, or with mischievous looks on their faces. Hanshan is identified by the scroll he holds in his hand, alluding to his work as a poet. Shide is identified by the broom he holds, which references his work as a kitchen cleaner at the monastery.

== Significance and Symbolism ==
The figures Hanshan and Shide, while often depicted simply and with humor, carry deep symbolism for the religion of Zen Buddhism as a whole. As seen in the attached images, Hanshan's scroll is often depicted blank. This indicates "that written or printed sutras are nothing compared to the book of nature." Shide's broom can be read as a tool to "sweep out of the cobwebs in our impure souls." Their carefree attitude symbolizes their knowledge that "the things which most men strive for are illusions, and that what really counts is not rank or riches but their own Buddha nature." Additionally, "in these lunatic figures the Zen artists portray something slightly more than a parody of their own wu-shin or mindless way of life, for as genius is to madness close allied there is a suggestive parallel between the meaningless babble of the happy lunatic and the purposeless life of the Zen sage." Hanshan and Shide serve the purpose of causing viewers to "confront the fundamental meaning of their own existence."

Many scholars during the Muromachi period regarded Hanshan and Shide to be incarnations of the bodhisattvas Mañjuśrī (Monju) and Samantabadhra (Fugen). These bodhisattvas represent wisdom and Buddhist practice respectively, perhaps creating a parallel between the wisdom and practice of Hanshan and Shide. Mañjuśrī is often connected to poetry, oratory, and writing, in the same way that Hanshan is connected to his own poems. This comparison suggests the hidden significance of these otherwise eccentric and simple characters.

== Visual Representations ==
=== Four Sleepers ===
Early representations of Hanshan and Shide in Zen painting can be found in images depicting the "Four Sleepers." The exact creation of this theme is unclear, though it is believed to have been established as a part of Zen painting in China by the early thirteenth century. "The earliest reference known to us concerning the artistic treatment of the subject is a poem in the Rujing Heshang yulu composed by the Chinese abbot Changweng Rujing (1163-1228) for a now lost painting of the 'Four Sleepers.'"

One example of early renderings of the "Four Sleepers" is by the Japanese artist Mokuan. In Mokuan's "Four Sleepers," Hanshan and Shide are seen sleeping soundly on the ground with Fenggan (the Zen master who found and raised Shide) and Fenggan's tiger. The inscription on this hanging scroll reads:

Old Old Feng-kan embraces his tiger and sleeps,
All huddled together with Shih-te and Han-shan
They dream their big dream, which lingers on,
While a frail old tree clings to the bottom of the cold precipice.

Shao-mu of the Hsiang-fu [temple] salutes with folded hands.

The imagery of the Four Sleepers was made popular in Japan through paintings imported from China. Japanese interpretations of the theme emerged as early as the fourteenth century.'"

Images of the Four Sleepers are meant to symbolize "peaceful coexistence with nature and the enlightened mind," as the three men sleep soundly among a tiger and outdoors, in nature. Additionally, the sleeping figures hint at a "dream world that cannot be represented on paper" or a "peacefulness of Enlightenment that cannot be attained in the waking world." Key themes of Zen Buddhism are given shape in images of the Four Sleepers, such as the non-duality of man and animal sleeping peacefully, the serenity of enlightenment, and expunging of opposite figures and forces.

=== Representations as a pair ===
Hanshan and Shide are most commonly depicted with just one another. In Zen painting, the two eccentrics are typically shown laughing uproariously, frequently at a Zen joke and at the expense of the "pompous monks" at their monastery. Hanshan and Shide wear shabby clothing and are easily identifiable by their scroll and broom, respectively. Over centuries, Zen painters have depicted these figures in different styles and manners, though keep to the main themes, motifs, and ideas that the pair represents.

==== Pre-modern Representations ====
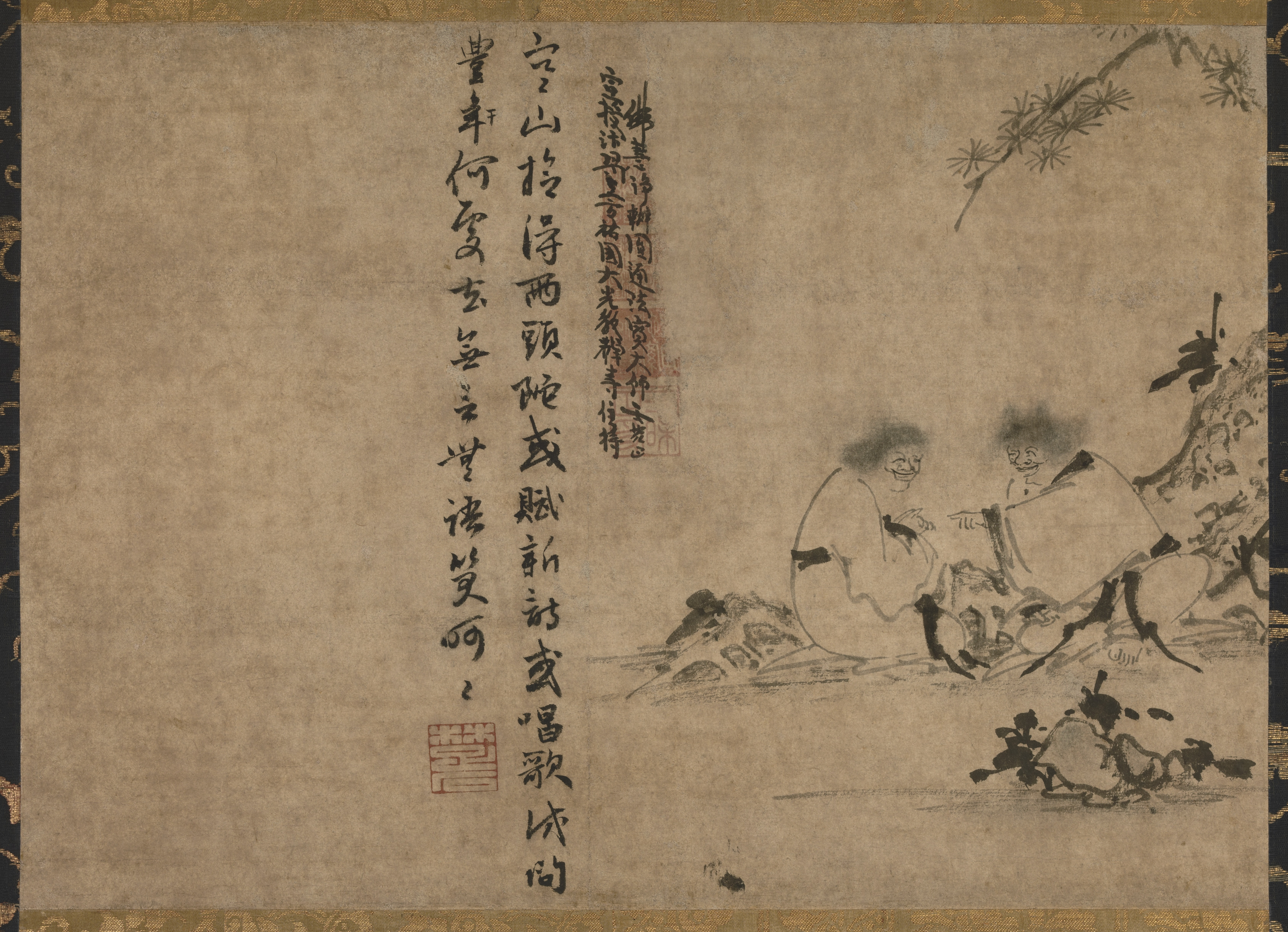
Hanshan and Shide (寒山拾得図, kanzan jittokuzu). Handscroll, 35.0 × 49.5 cm. Ink on paper. Located at Tokyo National Museum, Tokyo.

===== 14th century =====
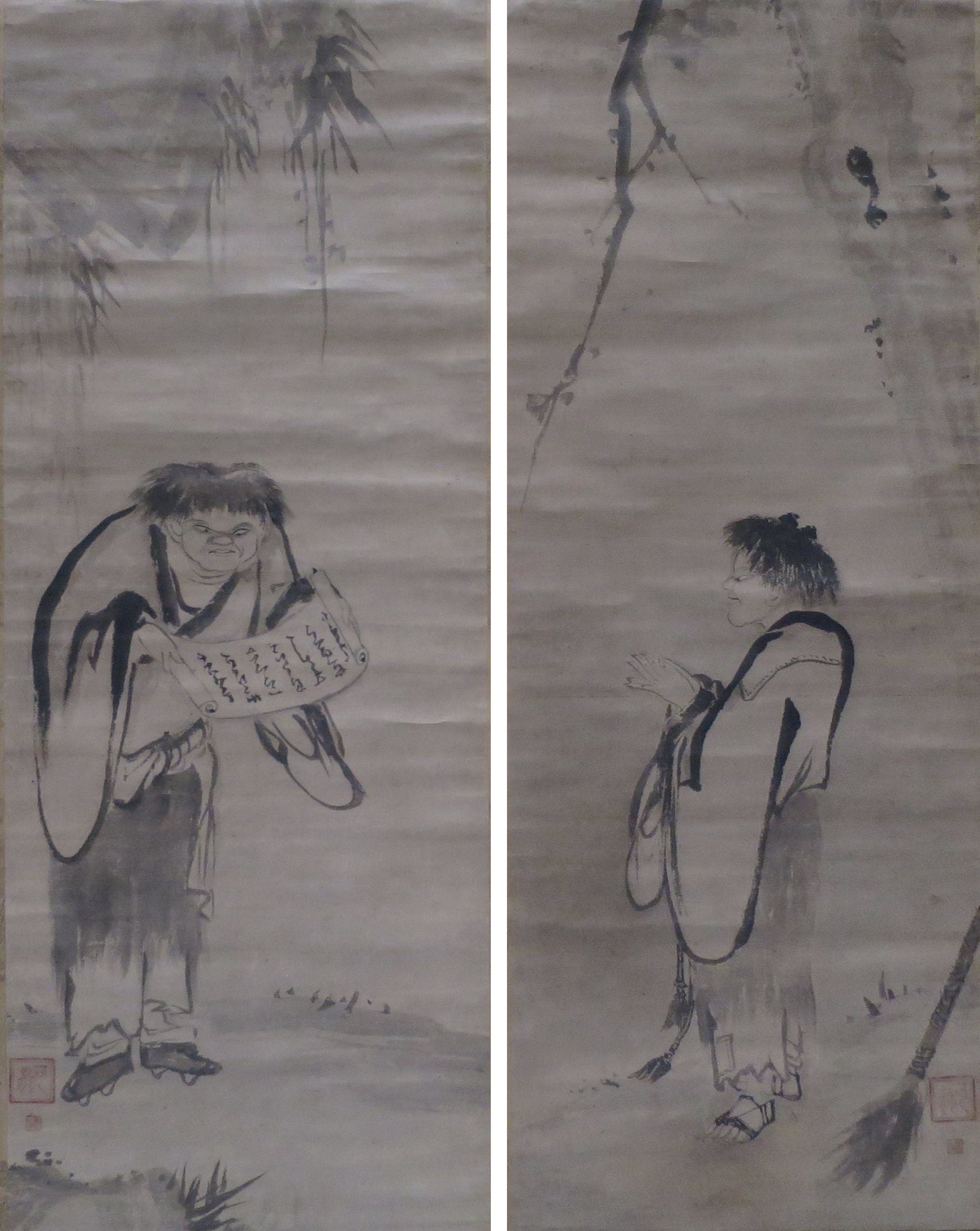
Zen Eccentrics Hanshan and Shide by Kaō Ninga, Nanbokuchō period, 14th century, ink on paper, Tokyo National Museum

Paintings of Hanshan and Shide were favored among Zen monks following the Chinese Song Dynasty (960-1279), and grew in popularity in the 13th and 14th centuries in China and Japan. During the 14th century, important Zen painters like Yintuoluo, a Chan monk born in India who lived in China during the Yuan Dynasty (1279-1368), created images of Hanshan and Shide that are now considered national treasures in Japan. During this period, painters followed traditional standards for figure painting, with a combination of thin and delicate lines to render their faces and thicker lines on their bodies. These images were almost always accompanied by an inscription, though not all have been translated or attributed to an author. This style of painting is also exemplified through Kao Ninga's Zen Eccentrics Hanshan and Shide, a pair of paintings depicting the figures.

===== 15th Century =====
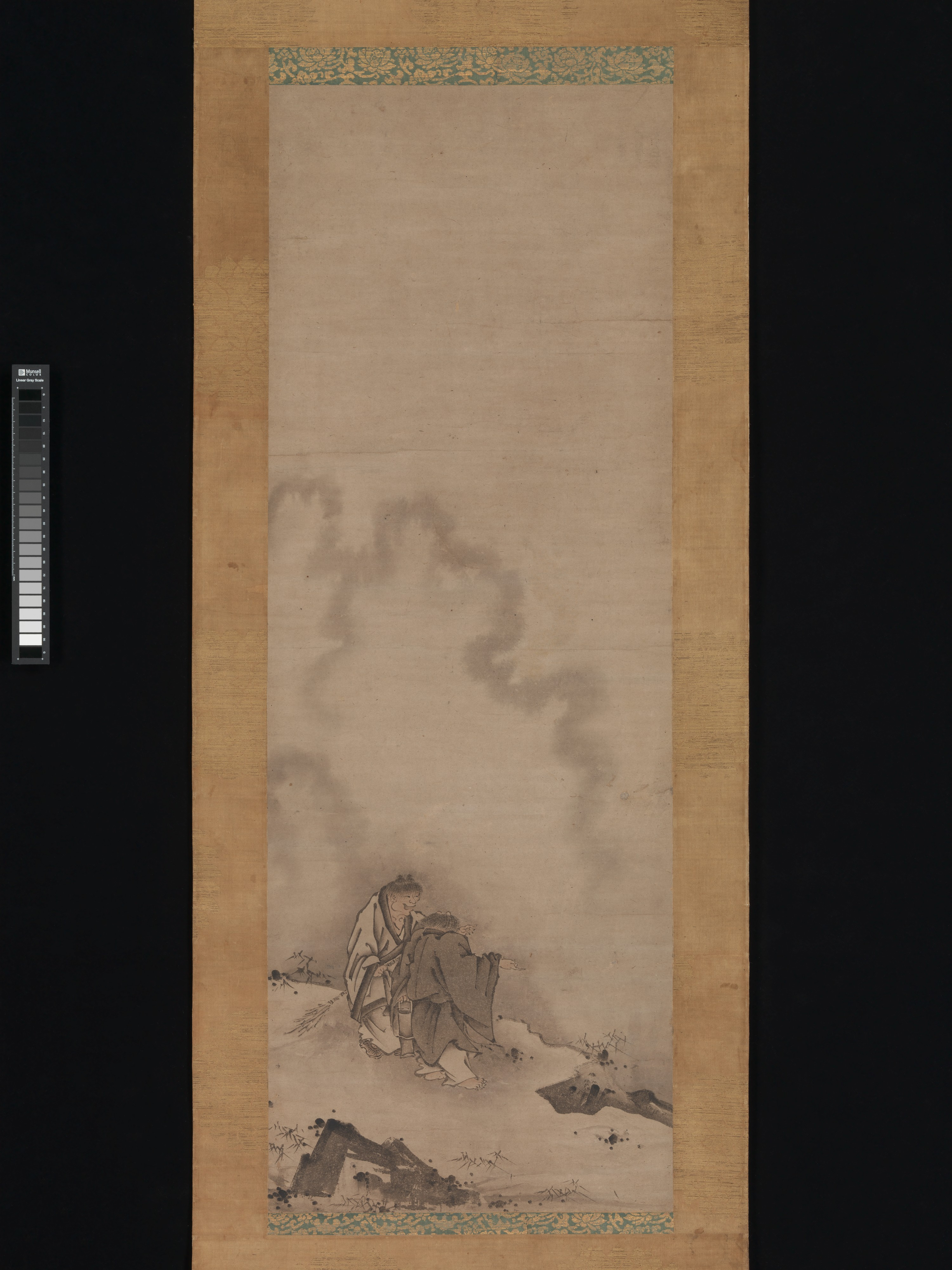
Fenggan, Hanshan, and Shide by Resai, Muromachi Period, 1st half of the 15th century, ink and color on paper, Metropolitan Museum of Art

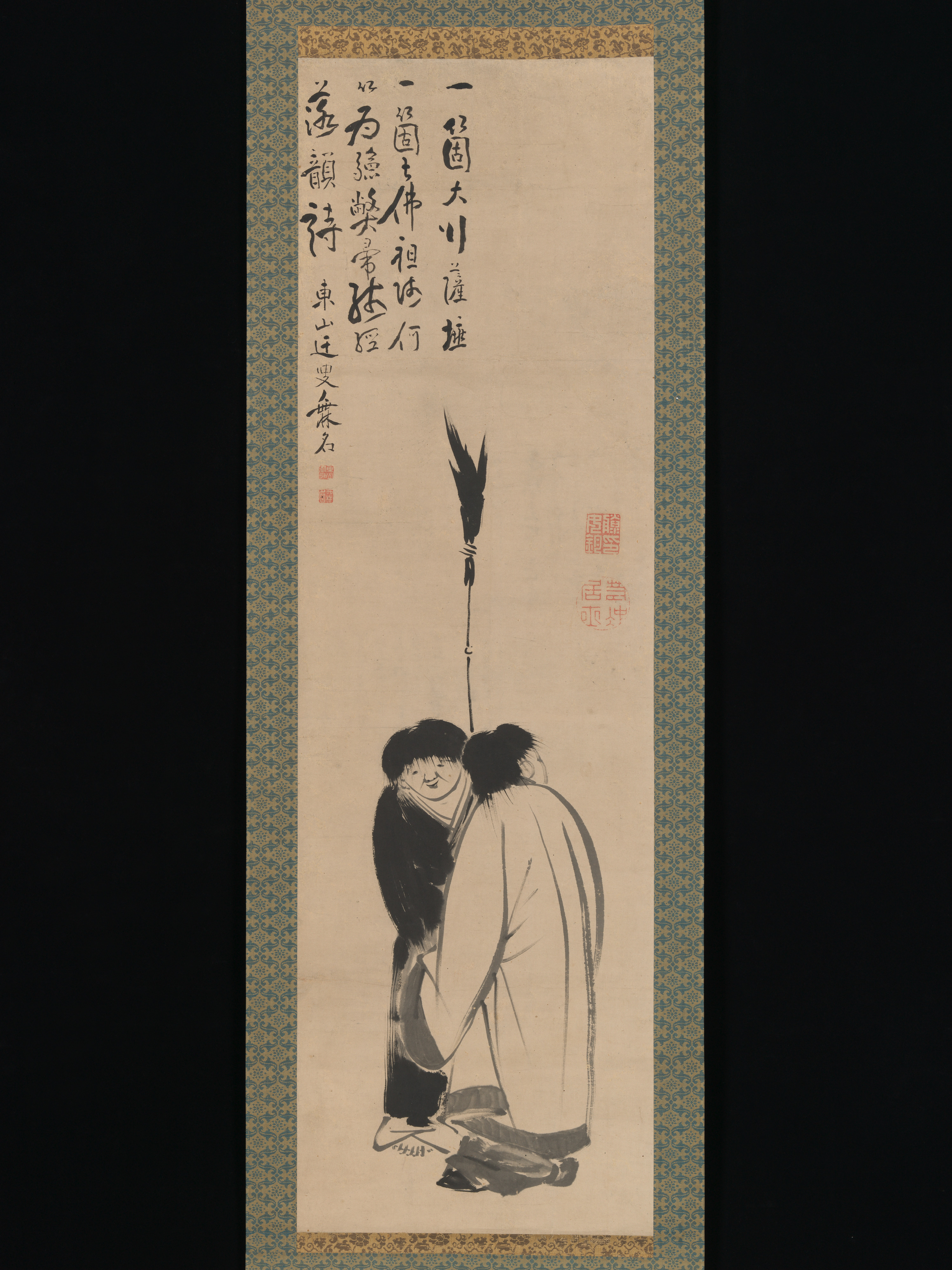
Hanshan and Shide by Ike Taiga, late 18th century, ink on paper, Metropolitan Museum of Art

The subject of Hanshan and Shide remained popular in Zen painting in the 15th century. During the Muromachi Period (1392-1573) in Japan, artists like Resai experimented with color and tonality more so than in previous centuries. Resai's depiction of Hanshan and Shide is complex and contemplative, as the pair is seen on the pair on a mountain's edge with a vast space of nothingness beyond where they stand. They are shown in discussion and pointing out to the nothingness, perhaps exploring different facets of enlightenment as they often did. There are varying tones of ink, and areas are shaded and filled in. Resai stays true to common themes with Hanshan and Shide, showing their scroll, broom, joyous faces, and depicting them in nature.

Also painting during the Muromachi period was Sesshū Tōyō, who is described as the most prominent master of ink painting from this time. Sesshu Toyo's painting of Kanzan and Jittoku differs from others seen, as it is a bust length image of the two figures' faces. Sesshu Toyo pays great attention to rendering their emotions and mischievous glances, as they laugh together while Kanzan holds a blank scroll. Through this, he captures the essence of the two figures. Sesshu Toyo employs variation in ink tonalities and in the thickness of his lines. There is three dimensional modeling to the faces and hands of the figures, demonstrating a more elevated and advanced style of painting.

==== Modern Representations ====
Representations of Hanshan and Shide remained very popular in Japan in the 16th, 17th, and 18th centuries, and well into the 19th century.

In the late 18th century, during the Edo Period (1615–1868), Ito Jakuchu painted Hanshan and Shide (Kanzan and Jittoku). His rendition is more abstract than any of the aforementioned paintings. The figures are depicted embracing and in opposites – one in a black robe and one in a white robe, with a scroll at their feet and a broom rising up. There is no background, placing the focus on the figures themselves. The inscription is attributed to Ike Taiga (Japanese, 1723–1776) and reads:

One is the Bodhisattva of the Great Path,
The other is the Patriarch of the Great Buddha.
What evidence is there? A broken broom, a tattered scripture, and unrhymed verse.

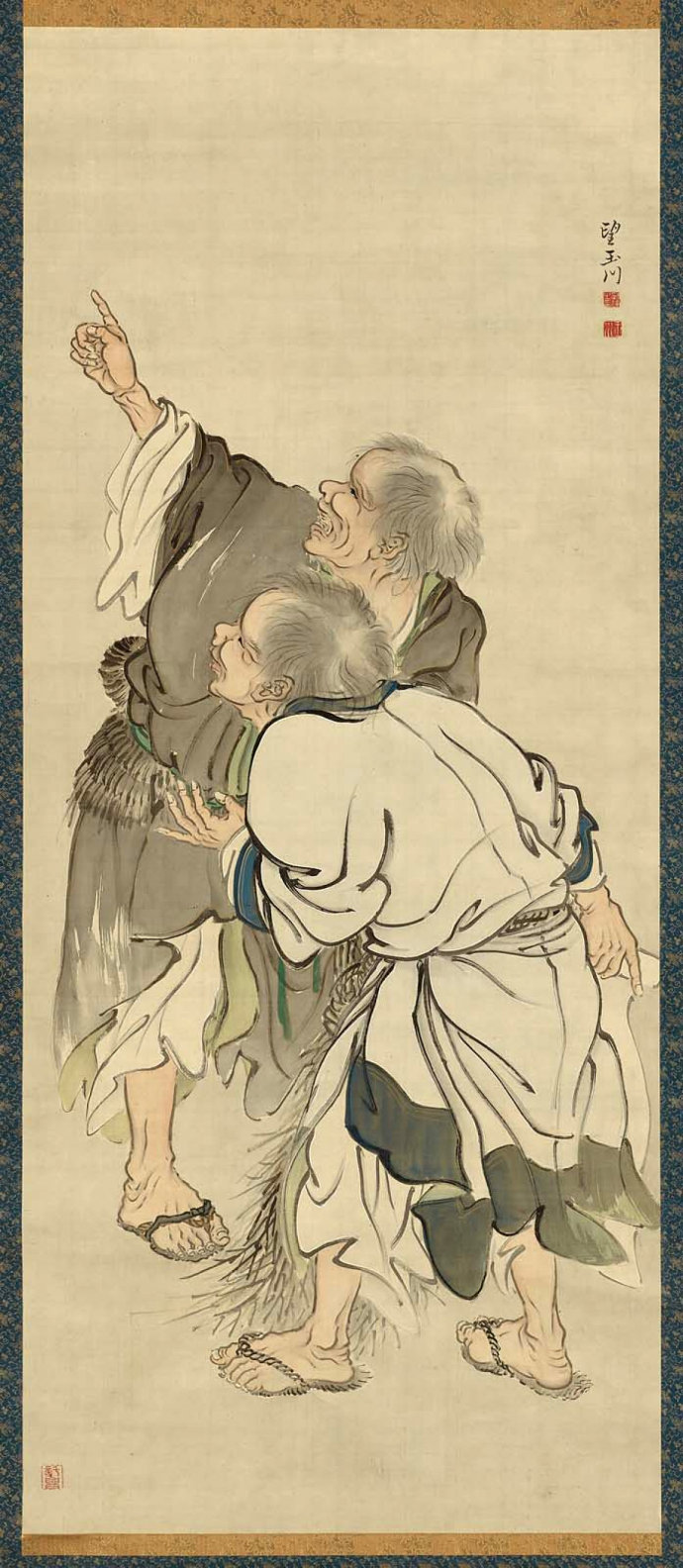
Hanshan and Shide by Mochizuki Gyokusen, 19th century, Museum of Fine Arts Boston

The inscription references their emanations of Mañjuśrī (Monju) and Samantabadhra (Fugen).

In the 19th century, Japanese Zen painter Mochizuki Gyokuzen created a hanging scroll depicting the pair. Here, we see a shift in style from previous centuries. This painting is done in a more graphic manner, and Mochizuki Gyokuzen employs different colors and sharper lines to create a more cartoon-looking image of the pair. The figures are emotive and looking upwards at something outside of the picture frame, rather than at a scroll. Still, we see the common motifs of the ragged clothing, the broom, and the blank scroll in Kanzan's hand.

Also in the 19th century, during the Meiji Period (1868–1912), was Hashimoto Gahō. His hanging scroll depicting the pair is done in ink and slight tint on paper, harkening back to the simple ink and wash paintings of previous centuries, though done in a far more modern manner. Hashimoto Gaho employs variations in ink tonalities and texture, as seen through the fuzzy hair, the different tones of the ground they stand on, and the fur on Kanzan's skirt. Jittoku is seen laughing and pointing to the blank scroll, while Kanzan looks on in amusement. The faces of the two figures are three dimensionally modeled, making them appear more realistic and modern than past renderings. The tree branches point downward to the characters to direct the attention of viewers. Nearly every common motif associated with the figures are employed in this painting, though it is done in a modern and expressive manner.
