= Hanshan =

Hanshan may refer to:

- Hanshan (poet) (寒山), a figure associated with a collection of poems from the Tang dynasty
- Hanshan Deqing (憨山德清), a Buddhist monk from the Chinese Ming dynasty
- Mountain Cry (Chinese: 喊山; pinyin: Hǎnshān), 2015 Chinese film

== PR China ==
- Hanshan County (含山县), of Chaohu City, Anhui
- Hanshan District (邯山区), Handan, Hebei
- Hanshan Temple (寒山寺), Buddhist temple and monastery in Suzhou
- Hanshan, Shuyang County (韩山镇), town in Shuyang County, Jiangsu
