= Tiantai (disambiguation) =

Tiantai (天台宗) is a sect of Buddhism, also called Tendai in Japanese.

It may also refer to the following locations:

== China ==
- Tiantai County, Zhejiang
  - Tiantai Mountain, mountain in Tiantai County
- Tiantai, Guizhou, town in Chishui City
- Tiantai, Jiangxi, town in Yuanzhou District, Yichun
- Tiantai, Jilin, town in Dehui
- Tiantai Township, Xuanhan County, Sichuan

== Taiwan ==
- Tiantai Hill, a hill in the Penghu National Scenic Area in Taiwan

== See also ==
- Tendai (disambiguation)
- Tiantai Temple (disambiguation)
