= Shide (monk) =

Chinese Buddhist poet and monk

Shide (Chinese: 拾得; pinyin: Shídé; Wade–Giles: Shih-Te; lit. 'Pick-up or Foundling', fl. 9th century) was a Tang dynasty Chinese Buddhist poet at the Guoqing Temple on Mount Tiantai on the East China Sea coast; roughly contemporary with Hanshan and Fenggan, but younger than both of them. As close friends, the three of them formed the "Tiantai Trio". Shide lived as a lay monk, and worked most of his life in the kitchen of Guoqing Temple.

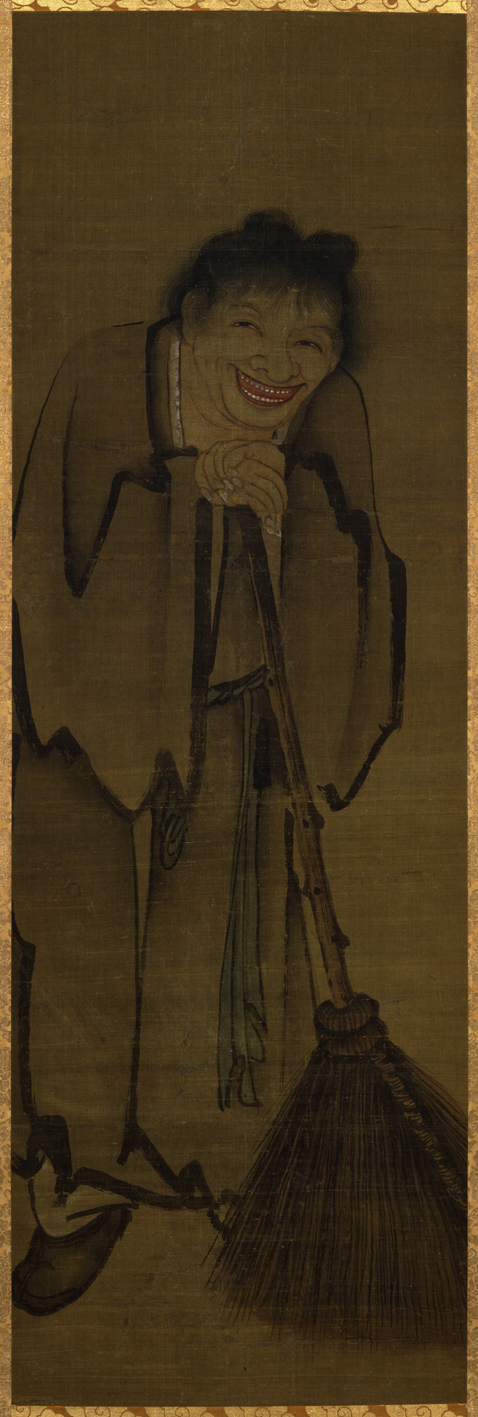
Painted by Yan Hui, Shi De 拾得. Color on silk. Tokyo National Museum. Depicting Shide with iconographic broom.

An apocryphal story relates how Shide received his name: Once, Fenggan was travelling between Guoqing Temple and the village of Tiantai, when at the redstone rock ridge called 'Red Wall' (赤城) he heard some crying. He investigated, and found a ten-year-old boy who had been abandoned by his parents; and picked him up and took him back to the temple, where the monks subsequently raised him.

Shide is referred to as Jittoku in Japanese.

Iconographically Shide is depicted with a broom, depicting insight and skillful means to remove the appearance of dust from the mundane world.

== Poetry ==
Shide wrote a number of poems, 49 of which have survived. According to Xiang Chu in his book Cold Mountain Poems and Notes, there are 57 poems attributed to Shide. Shide's poems are short, and rarely exceed 10 lines. They are typically on a Buddhist subject and executed in a style reminiscent of Hanshan's.

== See also ==
- Classical Chinese poetry
- Fenggan
- Hanshan (poet)
- Hanshan Temple
