= Shereni =

Shereni is a Zimbabwean surname. Notable people with the surname include:

- Harlington Shereni, a Zimbabwean footballer
- Tendai Shereni, a Zimbabwean cricketer
