= Tendai (disambiguation) =

Tendai (天台宗) is a Japanese school of Mahayana Buddhism.

Tendai may also refer to:

== Structures ==
- Tendai Station, a monorail station in Chiba, Japan

== People with the given name ==
- Tendai Biti (born 1966), Zimbabwean politician
- Tendai Chatara (born 1991), Zimbabwean cricketer
- Tendai Chisoro (born 1988), Zimbabwean cricketer
- Tendai Chimusasa (born 1971), Zimbabwean long-distance runner
- Tendai Chitiza (born 1995), Zimbabwean footballer
- Tendai Chitongo (born 1989), Zimbabwean cricketer
- Tendai Huchu, Zimbabwean author
- Tendai Jirira (born 1991), Zimbabwean footballer
- Tendai Machiri (born 1985), Zimbabwean cricketer
- Tendai Maruma (born 1992), Zimbabwean cricketer
- Tendai Mtawarira (born 1985), South African rugby union player
- Tendai Moyo, Zimbabwean-born founder
- Tendai Mukomberanwa (born 1974), Zimbabwean sculptor
- Tendai Musoni, Zimbabwean actress
- Tendai Mzungu (born 1986), Australian rules footballer
- Tendai Ndoro (1985–2025), Zimbabwean footballer
- Tendai Rinomhota, British actress
- Tendai M. Shaba, Malawian poet, author, and spoken word artist
- Tendai Shereni (born 1988), Zimbabwean cricketer

== See also ==
- Tendayi
- Tiantai (disambiguation), in Chinese
