= Fenggan =

Chinese Chan Buddhist monk and poet

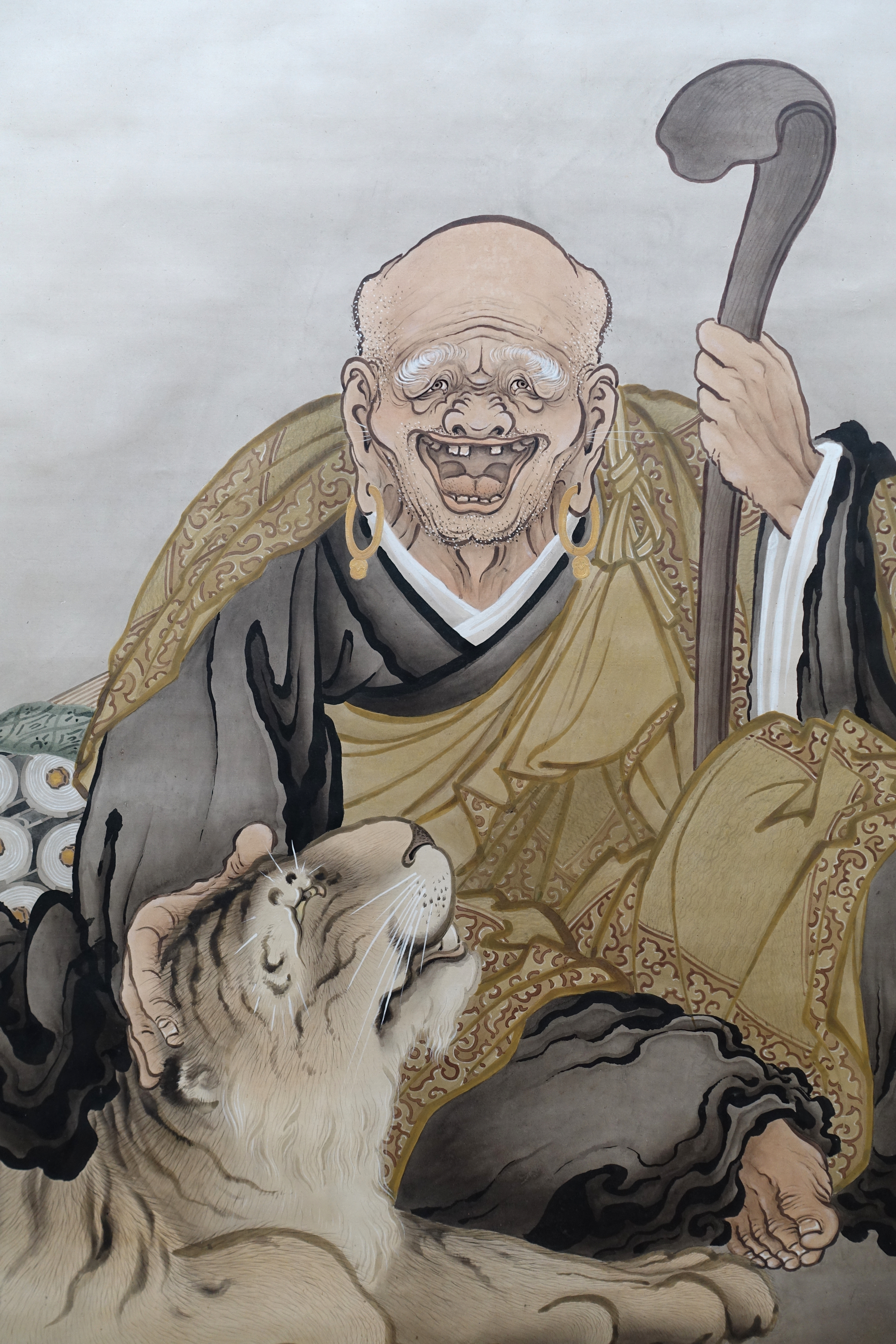
- Bukan by Hashimoto Gahō (detail)
- Title: monk poet

Personal life
- Born: China

Religious life
- Religion: Buddhism
- School: Ch'an

Fenggan (simplified Chinese: 丰干; traditional Chinese: 豐干; pinyin: Fēnggān; Wade–Giles: Fengkan; lit. 'Big Stick', Japanese Bukan, fl. 9th century) was a Chinese Chan monk-poet lived in the Tang dynasty, associated with Hanshan and Shide in the famed "Tiantai Trio" (天台三聖).

== Biography ==
Legendarily, Feng appeared one day at Guoqing Temple (located by the East China Sea, in the Tiantai mountain range), a 6-foot-tall (1.8 m) monk with an unshaven head, riding a tiger. From then on, he took up residence in the temple behind the library, where he would hull rice and chant sutras.

The few accounts of him record that he became close friends to Hanshan, and was the one who found the orphaned Shide, named him, and brought him to the temple. From these and other anecdotes, it appears that Feng was the oldest of the three.

The circumstances of his death are as murky as his life: the stories in which Feng is any more than a name or foil for Hanshan cease after he healed a local prefect. It has been conjectured that Hanshan's Poem 50 refers to his death:

Show me the person who doesn't die;
death remains impartial.
I recall a towering man
who is now a pile of dust-
the World Below knows no dawn
plants enjoy another spring
but those who visit this sorrowful place
the pine wind slays with grief.

== Poetry ==
Very few of Feng's poems survive, but the ones which do are very revealing; the third of the four confirms Feng's relationships with the other members of the Tientai Trio:

Whenever Cold Mountain stops to visit,
or Pick-Up pays his usual call,
we talk about the mind the moon
or wide open space-
reality has no limits
so anything real includes it all.

The first of the poems appears to confirm the stories of how he was an itinerant monk prior to stopping at Kuoching Temple (and even then he would depart at least once for a pilgrimage to Mount Wutai):

I have been to Tientai
maybe a million times
like a cloud or river
drifting back and forth.
Roaming free of trouble
trusting the Buddha's spacious path
while the world's forked mind
only brings men pain.

The fourth poem is especially important, since it unmistakably references the challenge the Fifth Patriarch of Zen set his would-be successors ~713 C. E. making it impossible for Feng (and by extension Hanshan and Shide) to predate the 720's, thereby eliminating many other dating possibilities:

Actually there isn't a thing
much less any dust to wipe away.
Who can master this
doesn't need to sit there stiff.

(The exchange referenced was between two potential successors Shenxiu and Huineng. Shenxiu to demonstrate his mastery of Zen wrote the following poem: The body is the Bodhi Tree \ the mind like a clear mirror. \ Always wipe it clean, \ don't let it gather dust. Huineng retorted with Bodhi isn't a tree, \ what's clear isn't a mirror. \ Actually, there isn't a thing- \ where do you get this dust?)

It is difficult to judge Feng's poetic oeuvre with only four works to judge by, and only one really poetic. But it appears that his poetry's formal structures were fairly conventional, and in ideas, from a strictly Buddhist perspective; Hanshan, in contrast, often played with rhymes and tones and structure, and very often dropped in Taoist references, to the point where his actual religious orientation is in some doubt. See for example Feng's second poem, which expresses strictly Buddhist ideas:

Sinking like a rock in the Sea,
drifting through the Three Worlds-
poor ethereal creature
forever immersed in scenes
until a flash of lightning shows
that life and death are dust in space.

(The 'Three Worlds' refer to either those of the past, present, and future; or alternatively, those of form, formlessness, and becoming.)

== See also ==
- Chinese Poetry
- Classical Chinese poetry
- Hanshan
- Hanshan Temple
- Shide
- Zen
