= Tiantai Temple =

Tiantai Temple (simplified Chinese: 天台寺; traditional Chinese: 天臺寺; pinyin: Tiāntaí Sì), may refer to:

- Tiantai Temple (Mount Jiuhua), on Mount Jiuhua, in Qingyang County, Anhui, China
- Tiantai Temple (Shijiazhuang), in Gaocheng District of Shijiazhuang, Hebei, China
- Tiantai Temple (Handan), in Feixiang District of Handan, Hebei, China
- Tiantai Temple (Chongqing), in Changshou District of Chongqing, China
- Tiantai Temple (Hong'an County), in Hong'an County, Hubei, China
- Tiantai Temple (Kazuo County), in Kazuo County, Liaoning, China
