= Hanshan (poet) =

Chinese monk and poet

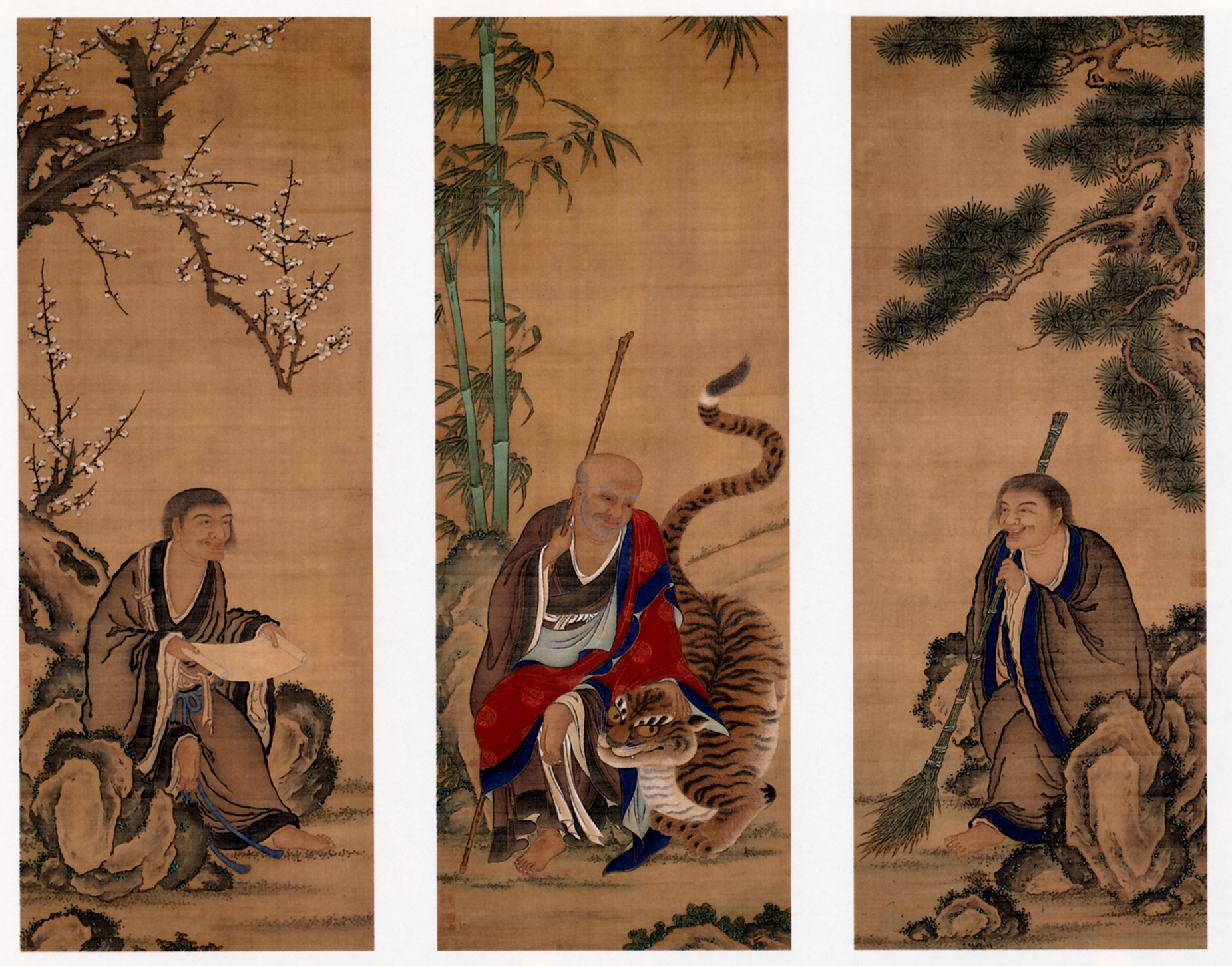
Hanshan (left), Fenggan (center), and Shide (right) by Ueno Jakugen, 18th century, Japan

Hanshan (Chinese: 寒山; pinyin: Hánshān; lit. 'Cold Mountain', fl. 9th century) was a Chinese Buddhist monk, poet, and spiritual writer during the Tang dynasty. He was a Chinese Buddhist and Taoist figure associated with a collection of poems from the Chinese Tang dynasty in the Taoist and Chan tradition. No one knows who he was, when he lived and died, or whether he actually existed. In the Chinese Buddhist tradition, Hanshan and his sidekick Shide are honored as emanations of the bodhisattvas Mañjuśrī and Samantabhadra, respectively. In Japanese and Chinese paintings, Hanshan is often depicted together with Shide or with Fenggan, another monk with legendary attributes.

Little is known of his work, since he was a recluse living in a remote region and his poems were written on rocks in the mountains he called home. Of the 600 poems he is thought to have written at some point before his death, 313 were collected and have survived. Among the 57 poems attributed to Hanshan's friend, Shide, seven appear to be authored by Hanshan, for a total of 320.

== Date ==
In Lüqiu Yin's (Chinese: 閭丘胤; pinyin: Lǘqiū yìn; Wade–Giles: Lu Ch'iu-Yin) preface to Hanshan's poems, he claims to have personally met both Hanshan and Shide at the kitchen of Guoqing Temple, but they responded to his salutations with laughter then fled. Afterwards, he attempted to give them clothing and provide them housing, but Lüqiu Yin writes that the pair fled into a cave which closed itself and Shide's tracks disappeared. This led Lüqiu Yin, governor of Tai Prefecture, to collect Hanshan's writings, "the poems written on bamboo, wood, stones, and cliffs — and also to collect those written on the walls of peoples' houses." However, Burton Watson is of the opinion that Lüqiu Yin did not exist in reality and that his preface to Hanshan's poems is nothing more than myth. In the introduction to his book, he says of Lüqiu Yin's preface to the poems:

[The preface], contrary to Chinese custom, is undated. Lu-chiu Yin represents himself as a high official and prefixes his name with a very imposing title. But there is only one mention of anyone by this name to be found in other works of the period, and it refers almost certainly to another person. This fact alone is peculiar enough, if Lu-chiu Yin was in fact as high up in the bureaucracy as his title indicates. Furthermore, the style of the preface, awkward and wordy, hardly suggests the writing of an eminent official. All other sources that tell us anything about Han-shan and Shih-te appear to be later than the preface and based upon it. For all we know, therefore, the whole picture of the two recluses built up in the preface may be nothing more than literary fiction. The poems, however, remain — over three hundred of them....If the reader wishes to know the biography of Han-shan, he must deduce it from the poems themselves.

If we follow Watson and discount the preface of Lüqiu Yin, accepting only the words of the poet himself, we see that Hanshan says only that he wrote his poems on the rocks. Nowhere in the poetry does he say that he wrote them on trees or bamboo or wood or the walls of people's houses.

The collection of poems attributed to Hanshan may span the entire Tang dynasty as Edwin G. Pulleyblank asserts in his study Linguistic Evidence for the Date of Hanshan. Wu Chi-yu in A study of Han-shan identifies him as the monk Zhiyan (智岩, 577–654), but that has been disputed by Paul Demiéville among others. The Encyclopedia of China gives his date as around 712 and after 793. Jia Jinhua came to the conclusion, after a study of Chan phrases in some 50 of the poems, that this particular group of poems may be attributable to the Chan monk Caoshan Benji (840–901). However, the dates for both Zhiyan and Caoshan Benji contradict Hanshan, who says that he was much older than either.

== Translations ==
Early translations include those by Arthur Waley 27 poems by Han-shan, Gary Snyder Cold Mountain Poems, and Burton Watson Cold Mountain: 100 Poems.

The first complete translation to a western language was into French by Patrick Carré (Le Mangeur de brumes : l'œuvre de Han-shan poète et vagabond). Stephan Schumacher translated 150 poems into German in 1980.

There are four full English translations, by Robert G. Henricks, Red Pine, Paul Rouzer and Peter Levitt

Other translations: Encounters With Cold Mountain, by Peter Stambler (130 poems). Cold Mountain Transcendental Poetry (96 poems) by Wandering Poet (2005, 2012).

== Biography ==
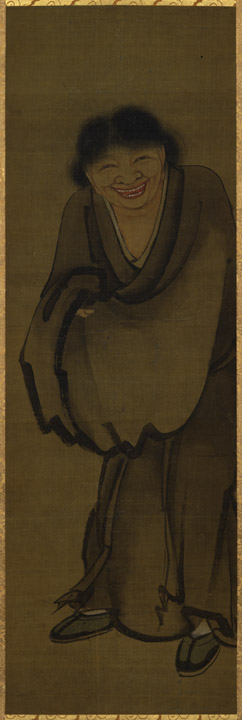
Yan Hui, Han Shan 寒山. Color on silk. Tokyo National Museum

In the introduction to his translation of Han-shan's poems, Burton Watson writes, “If the reader wishes to know the biography of Han-shan, he must deduce it from the poems themselves.” Watson goes further to describe Han-shan as "a gentleman farmer, troubled by poverty and family discord, who after extensive wandering and perhaps a career as a minor official" became a hermit. In Paul Rouzer's translation of poem 302, Han-shan appears to say that after leaving home and traveling he arrived at Tiantai Mountain at age 30, and that he was trained in the Confucian classics:

出生三十年， I’ve been in the world for thirty years,
當遊千萬里。 And I must have traveled a million miles.
行江青草合， Walked by rivers where the green grass grows thick,
入塞紅塵起。 And entered the frontier where the red dust rises.
鍊藥空求仙， Purified potions in vain search for immortality,
讀書兼詠史。 Read books and perused the histories.
今日歸寒山， Today I return to Cold Mountain,
枕流兼洗耳。 Pillow myself on the creek and wash out my ears.

A fanciful description of Han-shan is given by Lüqiu Yin in the introduction that is included in most editions of Han-shan's poems.

During his journey to his prefect appointment, Lüqiu Yin writes, he was visited by Fenggan, who said that he came from the Guoqing monastery. When Lüqiu Yin, who suffered from a headache, asked Fenggan to cure him, Fenggan laughed and said, "The human body consists of but four great elements, and illness is only illusion," then sprinkled water onto Lüqiu Yin, curing him instantly.

Lüqiu Yin then asked if there were any sages worthy of becoming of his tutor and Fenggan revealed that at Guoqing monastery were two Bodhisattva incarnations. The first, Han-shan, a man retired to the monastery, was, Fenggan said, an incarnation of Manjushri; the second, Shide, a man who "looked like a demented beggar coming and going, worked as an errand-boy at the stoves in the kitchen", was an incarnation of Samantabhadra.

Three days after arriving at his government appointment, Lüqiu Yin asked his chief administrator if there were any information about Han-shan and Shide. The administrator reported that "seventy li (approximately 35 km) to the west of the town of T'ang-hsing, there was a cliff where a poor scholar lived. This scholar was said to be seen going to the Kuo-ch'ing Monastery." Lüqiu Yin went to the monastery and asked where Fenggan, Han-shan, and Shide were living. The monks there told him that Fenggan lived behind the library, but now it was haunted by a tiger who often accompanied him. Lüqiu Yin visited Fenggan's room but all he found was a "house full of the tiger's footprints." When he asked what Fenggan was hired to do, the monks said that Fenggan was assigned to hull rice for the monks and would spend his nights singing to amuse himself.

Lüqiu Yin writes that no one knows where Han-shan came from. He relays descriptions of the poet given by elders from Guoqing Temple who said that Hanshan was "a poor and eccentric hermit" who "often went to the Kuo-ch'ing Monastery in order to take home the left-overs of the meal, which he carried in a bamboo tube given to him by Shih-te, a monk working in the dining-hall."

"Sometimes Han-shan would stroll for hours in a long corridor of the monastery, cry cheerfully, laugh or speak to himself. When he was taken to task or driven away by some of the monks armed with sticks, he would afterwards stand still and laugh, clapping his hands, and then disappear." Lüqiu Yin says that his appearance was that of "an emaciated beggar, but every word he uttered was pithy, meaningful and inspiring. He wore a cap make of birch bark, a simple fur garment, torn and threadbare, and wooden sandals for shoes."

Lüqiu Yin found Han-shan and Shide in the monastery kitchen, where he respectfully made obeisance to them. At sight of this, the two laughed and said, "Feng-kan has a long tongue. You did not recognize Maitreya at sight, why are you making obeisance to us now?" As Han-shan and Shide left hand in hand, the monks were stunned to see such a high official make obeisance to two poor scholars. Lüqiu Yin had two sets of clean clothing prepared and asked the monks to give them to Han-shan and Shide should they ever return. Lüqiu Yin later learned that the two hadn't reappeared at the monastery and had the presents delivered to their dwellings on Tiantai Mountain. When Hanshan saw these delivery men, it is said, he cried "Thieves! Thieves!" and retreated to a cave entrance, exclaiming, "Each of you should exert himself to the utmost," and withdrew into the cave, which closed itself behind him. Han-shan and Shide were never seen again at Guoqing temple.

Lüqiu Yin had all the writings left behind by Han-shan and Shide collected. Han-shan had written on rocks, bamboo bark, trees, and the walls of houses in neighboring villages, and Shide had written a 49-line poem on the wall of an Earth God temple.

== Poetry ==
Hanshan's poetry consists of Chinese verse, in 3, 5, or 7-character lines; never shorter than 4 lines, and never longer than 34 lines. The language is marked by the use of more colloquial Medieval Vernacular Sinitic than almost any other Tang poet. The poems can be seen to fall into three categories: the biographical poems about his life before he arrived at Cold Mountain; the religious and political poems, generally critical of conventional wisdom and those who embrace it; and the transcendental poems, about his sojourn at Cold Mountain. They are notable for their straightforwardness, which contrasts sharply with the cleverness and intricateness that marked typical Tang dynasty poetry.

Red Pine poem 283:

Mister Wang the Graduate
laughs at my poor prosody.
I don't know a wasp's waist
much less a crane's knee.
I can't keep my flat tones straight,
All my words come helter-skelter.
I laugh at the poems he writes-
a blind man's songs about the sun!

(All these terms refer to ways a poem could be defective according to the rigid poetic structures then prevalent.)

Thematically, Hanshan draws heavily on Buddhist and Taoist themes, often remarking on life's short and transient nature, and the necessity of escape through some sort of transcendence. He varies and expands on this theme, sometimes speaking of Mahayana Buddhism's 'Great Vehicle', and other times of Taoist ways and symbols like cranes.

The following poem begins with the imagery of the burning house and the three carts from the Parable of the Burning House found in The Lotus Sutra, then ends with typical Zen and Taoist imagery of freedom from conceptualizations.

Red Pine poem 253:

Children, I implore you
Get out of the burning house now.
Three carts await outside
to save you from a homeless life.
Relax in the village square
Before the sky, everything's empty.
No direction is better or worse,
East just as good as West.
Those who know the meaning of this
are free to go where they want.

This mixed influence is probably due to the high preponderance of Taoists and Buddhists in the same area. The eminent Taoist Ge Hong acclaimed Mount Tiantai as 'the perfect place for practicing the arts of immortality,' which is probably also why so many Buddhist temples were established in the vicinity as well.

Red Pine poem 13:

"Brothers share five districts;
father and sons three states."
To learn where the wild ducks fly
follow the white-hare banner!
Find a magic melon in your dream!
Steal a sacred orange from the palace!
Far away from your native land
swim with fish in a stream!

Many poems display a deep concern for humanity, which in his view stubbornly refuses to look ahead, and short-sightedly indulges in all manner of vice, like eating animal flesh, piling up sins 'high as Mount Sumeru'. But he holds out hope that people may yet be saved; 'Just the other day/ a demon became a Bodhisattva.'

Red Pine poem 18:

I spur my horse past ruins;
Ruins move a traveler's heart.
The old parapets high and low
The ancient graves great and small,
The shuddering shadow of a tumbleweed,
The steady sound of giant trees.
But what I lament are the common bones
unnamed in the records of immortals.

While Hanshan eschewed fancy techniques and obscure erudition, his poems are still highly evocative at times: Red Pine poem 106:

The layered bloom of hills and streams
Kingfisher shades beneath rose-colored clouds
mountain mists soak my cotton bandana,
Dew penetrates my palm-bark coat.
On my feet are traveling shoes,
My hand holds an old vine staff.
Again I gaze beyond the dusty world-
what more could I want in that land of dreams?

He is hard to pin down religiously. Chan concepts and terminology sometimes appear in his work. But he criticized the Buddhists at Tiantai, and he directed criticism at Taoists as well, having had no problem bringing Taoist scriptural quotations, and Taoist language when describing his mountains, into his poems. Yet, he does not mince words but tells us precisely where to find the path to Heaven.

Red Pine poem 117:

I deplore this vulgar place
where demons dwell with worthies.
They say they're the same,
but is the Tao impartial?
A fox might ape a lion's mien
and claim the disguise is real,
but once ore enters the furnace,
We soon see if it's gold or base.

Red Pine poem 246:

I recently hiked to a temple in the clouds
and met some Taoist priests.
Their star caps and moon caps askew
They explained they lived in the wild.
I asked them the art of transcendence;
they said it was beyond compare,
and called it the peerless power.
The elixir meanwhile was the secret of the gods
and that they were waiting for a crane at death,
or some said they'd ride off on a fish.
Afterwards, I thought this through
and concluded they were all fools.
Look at an arrow shot into the sky-
How quickly it falls back to earth.
Even if they could become immortals,
They would be like cemetery ghosts.
Meanwhile, the moon of our mind shines bright.
How can phenomena compare?
As for the key to immortality,
Within ourselves is the chief of spirits.
Don't follow Lords of the Yellow Turban
persisting in idiocy, holding onto doubts.

The following poem is attributed to Hanshan's friend, Shide.

The higher the trail the steeper it grows
Ten thousand tiers of dangerous cliffs
The stone bridge is slippery with green moss
Cloud after cloud keeps flying by
Waterfalls hang like ribbons of silk
The moon shines down on a bright pool
I climb the highest peak once more
To wait where the lone crane flies

Red Pine's poem 307:

Whoever has Cold Mountain's poems
is better off than those with sutras.
Write them up on your screen
and read them from time to time.

== Legacy ==
The poetry from Cold Mountain has influenced the poets of many generations and cultures. He is especially loved by the Japanese, who know him as Kanzan. Hanshan was a sympathetic and important figure for Beat Generation writers Gary Snyder and Jack Kerouac. In the introduction to his translation which appeared in the Evergreen Review, Snyder wrote of Hanshan, "He and his sidekick Shih-te (Jittoku in Japanese) became great favorites with Zen painters of later days — the scroll, the broom, the wild hair and laughter. They became Immortals and you sometimes run into them today in the skidrows, orchards, hobo jungles, and logging camps of America." Kerouac's The Dharma Bums closes with a vision of Hanshan and, at Snyder's suggestion, Kerouac dedicated the book to the fabled poet.

Paul Rouzer reads the poems as Buddhist teaching poems, referring to Hakuin Ekaku Kanzan shi sendai kimon 寒山詩闡提記聞 (1746) ("Notes on the Lectures on Cold Mountain's Poems at Icchantika Cave") that largely ignores the biographical reading most commonly found in other sources.

Translations by Snyder and by Red Pine were influential in the work of the artist Brice Marden, who executed a large series of paintings, drawings, and prints themed around the poems.

Poems by Hanshan influenced music by the Microphones and Mount Eerie, both fronted by Phil Elverum.

== See also ==
- Chinese poetry
  - Classical Chinese poetry
- Fenggan
- Shide (monk)
- Shiwu
