= Indra (painter) =

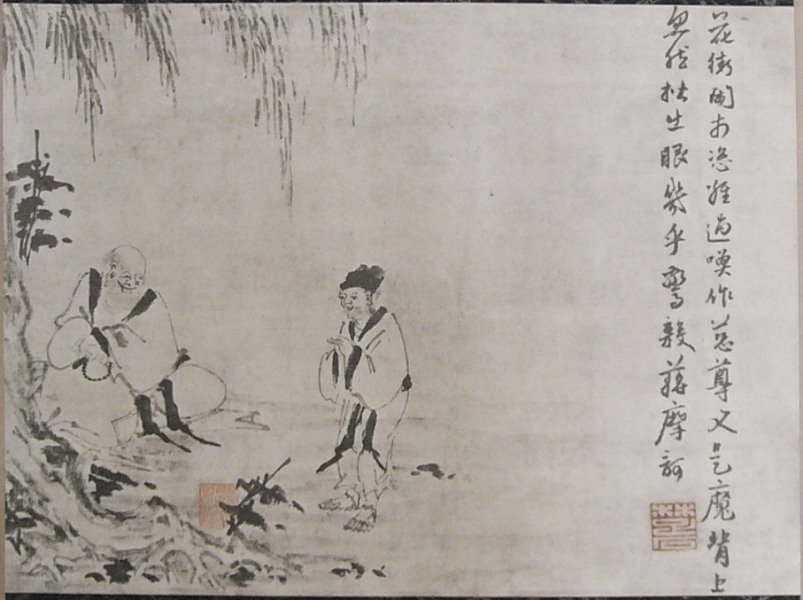
A painting depicting Budai with Jiang Mohe, now in the collection of Nezu Art Museum, Tokyo, Japan.

Indra (Sanskrit: इन्द्र, Chinese: 因陀羅, pinyin: Yīntuóluó, Wade–Giles: Yin-t'o-lo, Hepburn: Indara), courtesy name Renfan (壬梵), was a painter and Chan Buddhist monk of Indian descent who was active in Kaifeng, China during the Mongol Empire-Yuan dynasty period (latter half of the 13th and the first half of the 14th century). Somewhat unusually, none of his works survived in China or was mentioned in any of the numerous catalogues of Chinese paintings from the Ming and Qing periods; his entire oeuvre survived in Japan only. He was said to be a native of Rajagriha in Magadha, India (now Rajgir, Bihar, India).

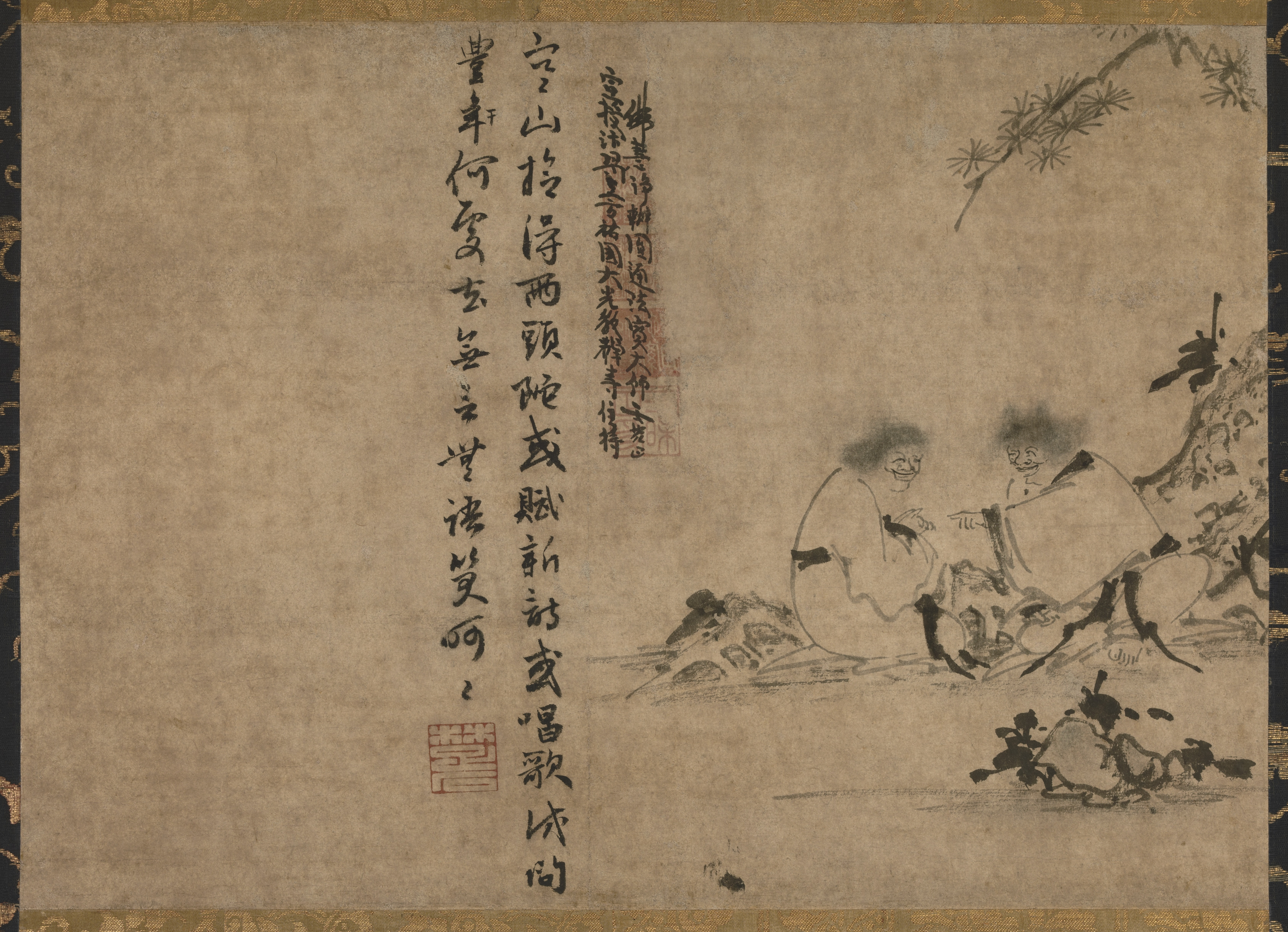
A painting depicting Hanshan and Shide, now in the collection of Tokyo National Museum, Tokyo.

Information about his life is scant. One of his paintings contains the signature of the Chan monk Shixi Xinyue (石溪心月, died 1274). Another handscroll contains five poems by the Chan monk Chushi Fanqi (楚石梵奇 1297–1371). There is, however, no real proof that Indra associated with any of them. He served as a priest in Da-Guang-Jiao Chan Temple (大光教禪寺, Da-Guang-Jiao Chan-si) in Kaifeng, and was also known as Master Fohui Jingbian Yuantong Fabao (佛慧浄辯圓通法寶大師, Fohui Jingbian Yuantong Fabao Dashi).
