= Yan Hui (painter) =

Chinese painter

Yan Hui (simplified Chinese: 颜辉; traditional Chinese: 顏輝; pinyin: Yán Huī; Wade–Giles: Yen Hui); was a late 13th-century Chinese painter who lived during the Southern Song and early Yuan dynasties. His specific dates of birth and death are not known. His exquisite brushstrokes were highly regarded.

== Biography ==
Yan Hui was born in Ji'an, Jiangxi province. His courtesy name was Qiuyue (秋月; lit. "autumn moon"). Yan primarily painted human, Buddhist, and ghost figures. His style incorporated profound brush strokes with special composition.

== Notable works of Yan Hui ==
- 中山出猎图 ("Zhongshan goes hunting")
- 李仙像 ("Li Xianxiang")
- 戏猿图 ("Plays the Ape")

== Gallery ==
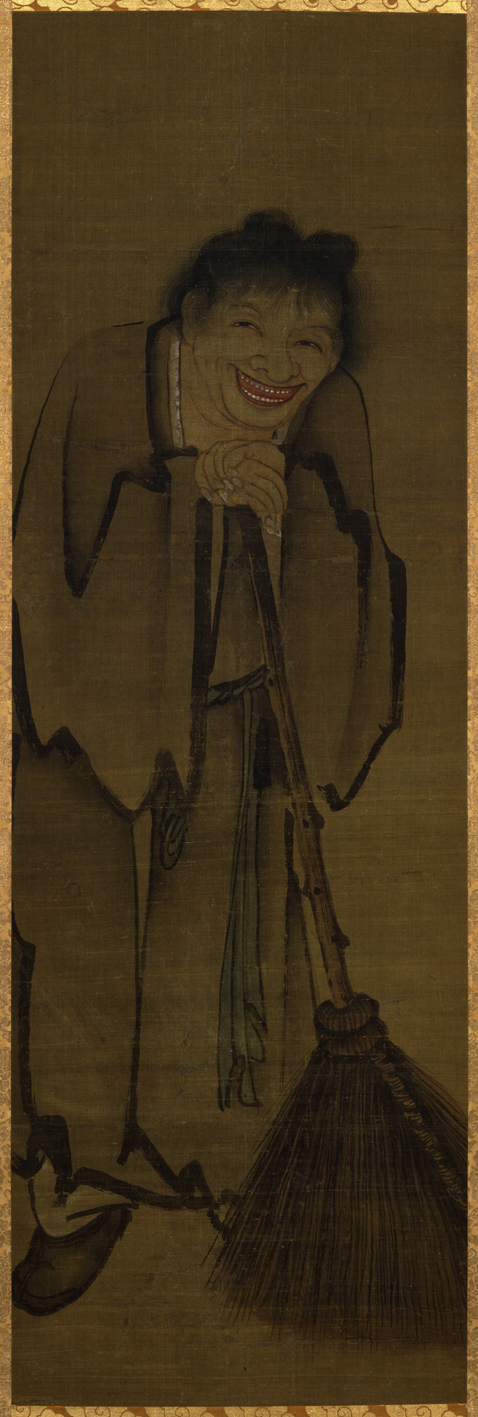
Yan Hui, Shi De 拾得. Color on silk. Tokyo National Museum

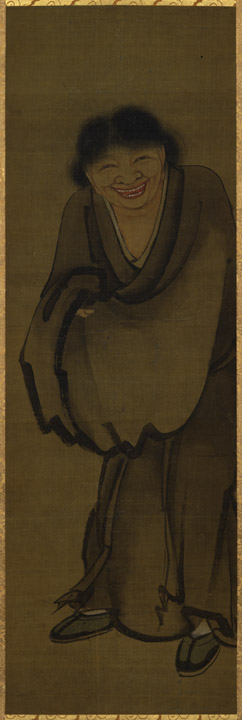
Yan Hui, Han Shan 寒山. Color on silk. Tokyo National Museum

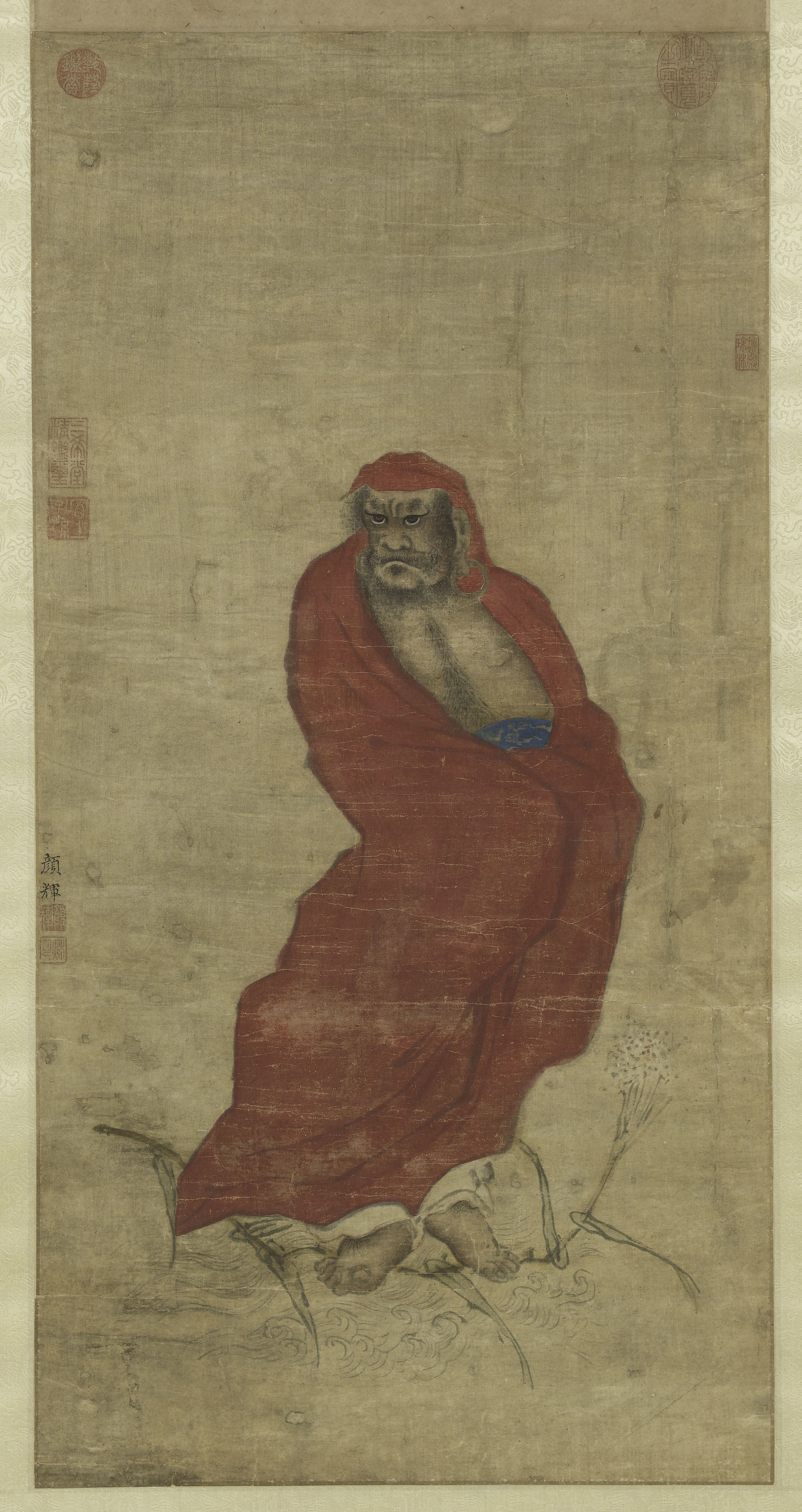
Bodhidarma crossing the Yangtze River. Musée Cernuschi
