= Tendayi =

Tendayi, also spelled Tendai, and its long form Tendayishe or Tendaishe, is a Shona given name from the phrase Kupa kutenda, meaning 'give thanks to God', that may refer to:

- Tendai Biti (born 1966), Zimbabwean politician
- Tendai Chatara (born 1991), Zimbabwean cricketer
- Tendai Chisoro (born 1988), Zimbabwean cricketer
- Tendai Chimusasa (born 1971), Zimbabwean long-distance runner
- Tendayi Darikwa (born 1991), English football player
- Tendayi Gahamadze (born 1959), Zimbabwean songwriter
- Tendayi Jembere, British actor
- Tendai Mtawarira (born 1985), South African rugby union player
- Tendai Mukomberanwa (born 1974), Zimbabwean sculptor
- Tendai Mzungu (born 1986), Australian rules footballer
- Zendaya (born 1996), American actress

== See also ==
- Jendayi Frazer
- Tendai (disambiguation)
