= Tiantai Temple (Shijiazhuang) =

Buddhist temple in Shijiazhuang, Hebei, China

- 天台寺
- Location within Hebei

Religion
- Affiliation: Buddhism
- Deity: Chan Buddhism

Location
- Location: Gaocheng District, Shijiazhuang, Hebei
- Country: China
- Interactive map of Tiantai Temple
- Coordinates: 38°01′16″N 114°47′04″E

Architecture
- Style: Chinese architecture
- Established: 627–649
- Completed: 2012 (reconstruction)

Website
- www.tiantaisi.com

Tiantai Temple (simplified Chinese: 天台寺; traditional Chinese: 天臺寺; pinyin: Tiāntaí Sì) is a Buddhist temple located in Gaocheng District of Shijiazhuang, Hebei, China.

== History ==
The original temple dates back to the Zhenguan period of the Tang dynasty, while Tiantai master Zhang'an (章安) came here to disseminate the Lotus Sutra. The temple gradually fell into ruin during the Chinese Civil War and was completely destroyed in 1985. Tiantai Temple was rebuilt in 1990, with the support of local Buddhist believers. In 2013, Guotong (果通) was proposed as the abbot of Tiantai Temple. He supervised the reconstruction project. The reconstruction took 12 years, and lasted from 2000 to 2012.

== Architecture ==
The complex includes the following halls: Shanmen, Mahavira Hall, Hall of Four Heavenly Kings, Hall of Ksitigarbha, Bell Tower, Drum Tower, Hall of Guru, Dharma Hall, Dining Room, etc.
