= Hanshan Temple =

Buddhist temple in Suzhou, Jiangsu, China

- 寒山寺
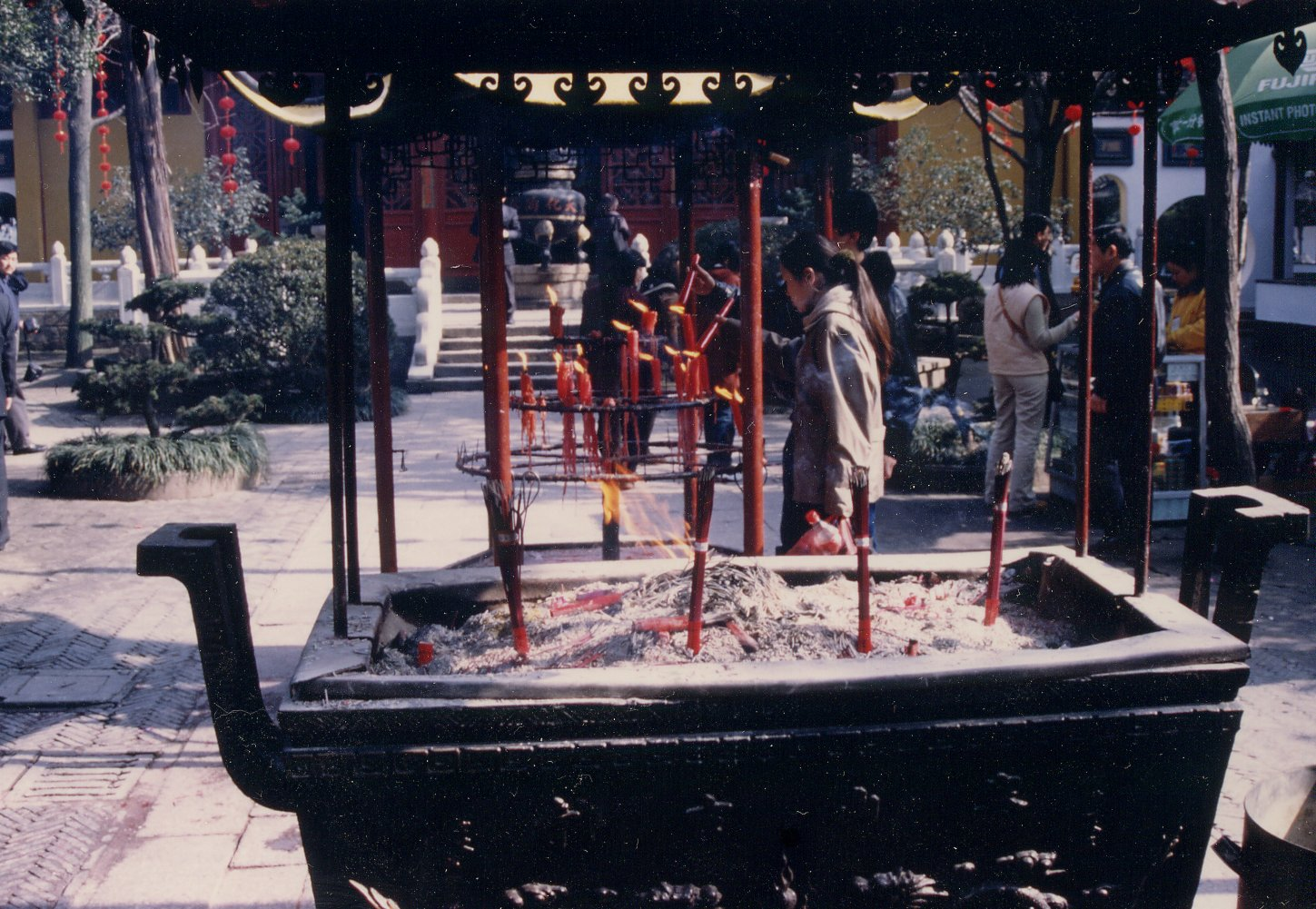
- Mahavira Hall

- Location within Jiangsu

Religion
- Affiliation: Buddhism
- Sect: Linji school

Location
- Location: Gusu District, Suzhou, Jiangsu, China
- Coordinates: 31°18′44.67″N 120°33′53.39″E

Architecture
- Style: Chinese architecture
- Established: 502–519
- Completed: 1906 (reconstruction)

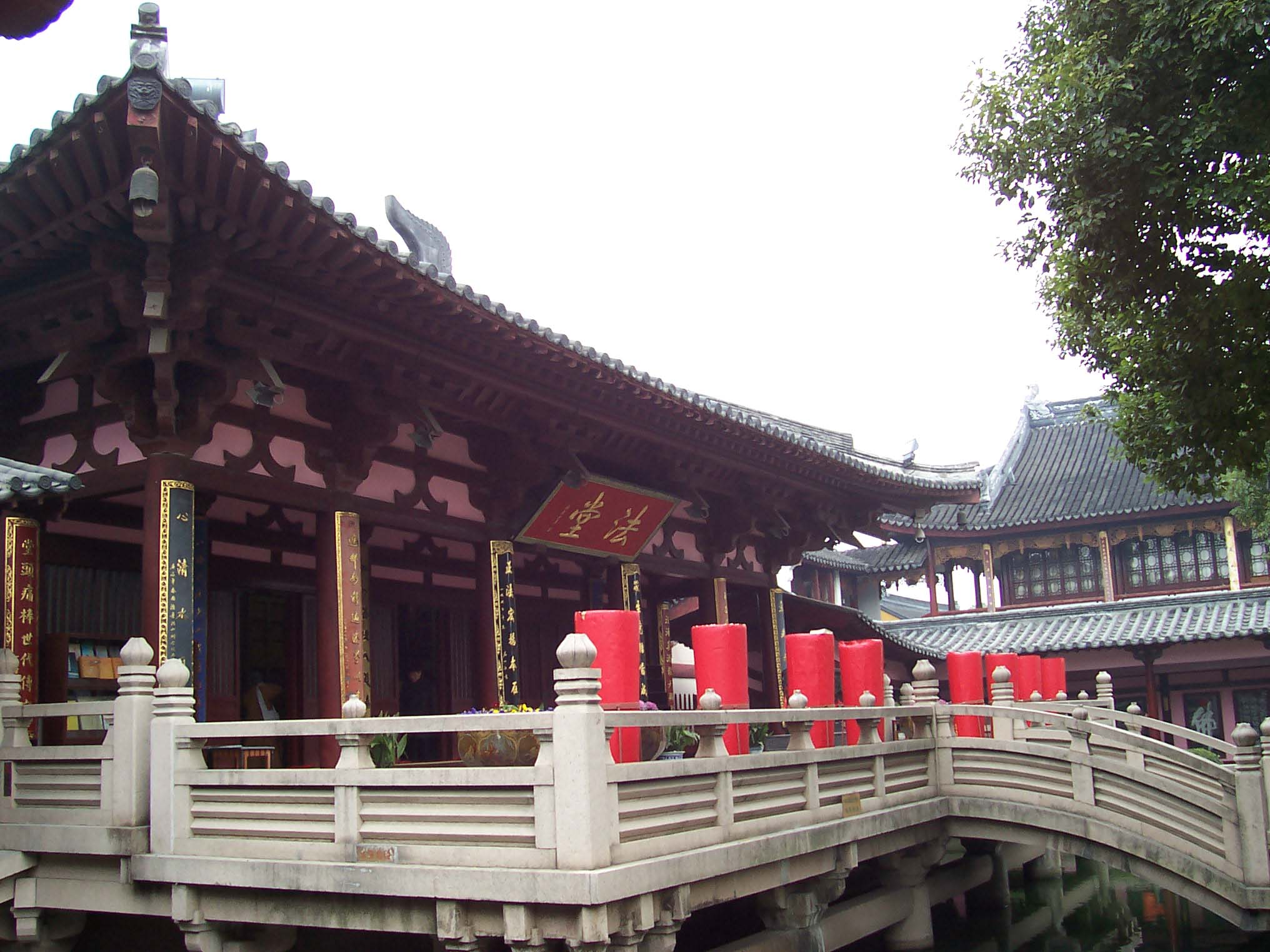
Family hall's Buddhist shrine

The Pagoda of Hanshan Temple (2024)

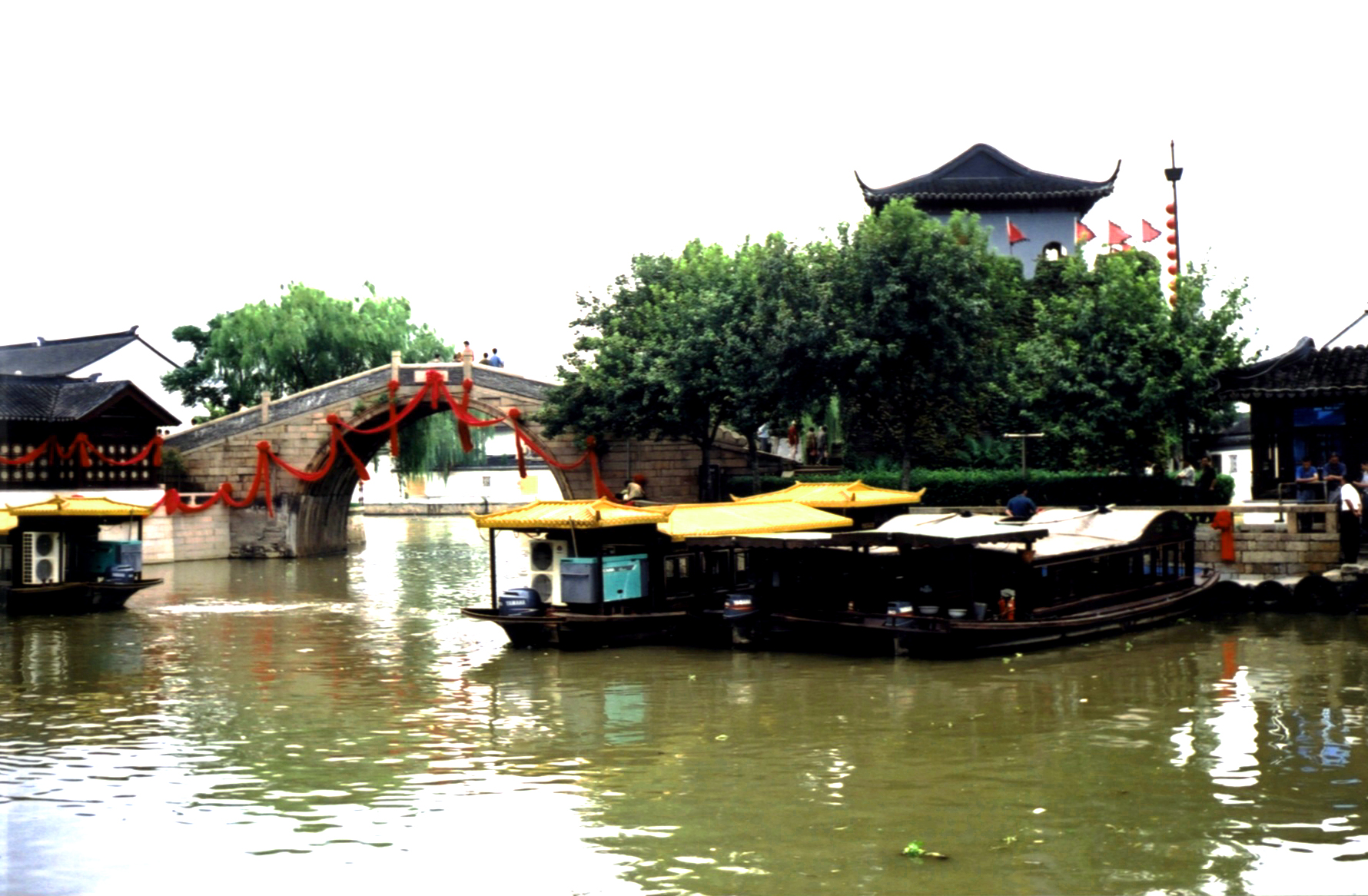
Boats at the Maple Bridge

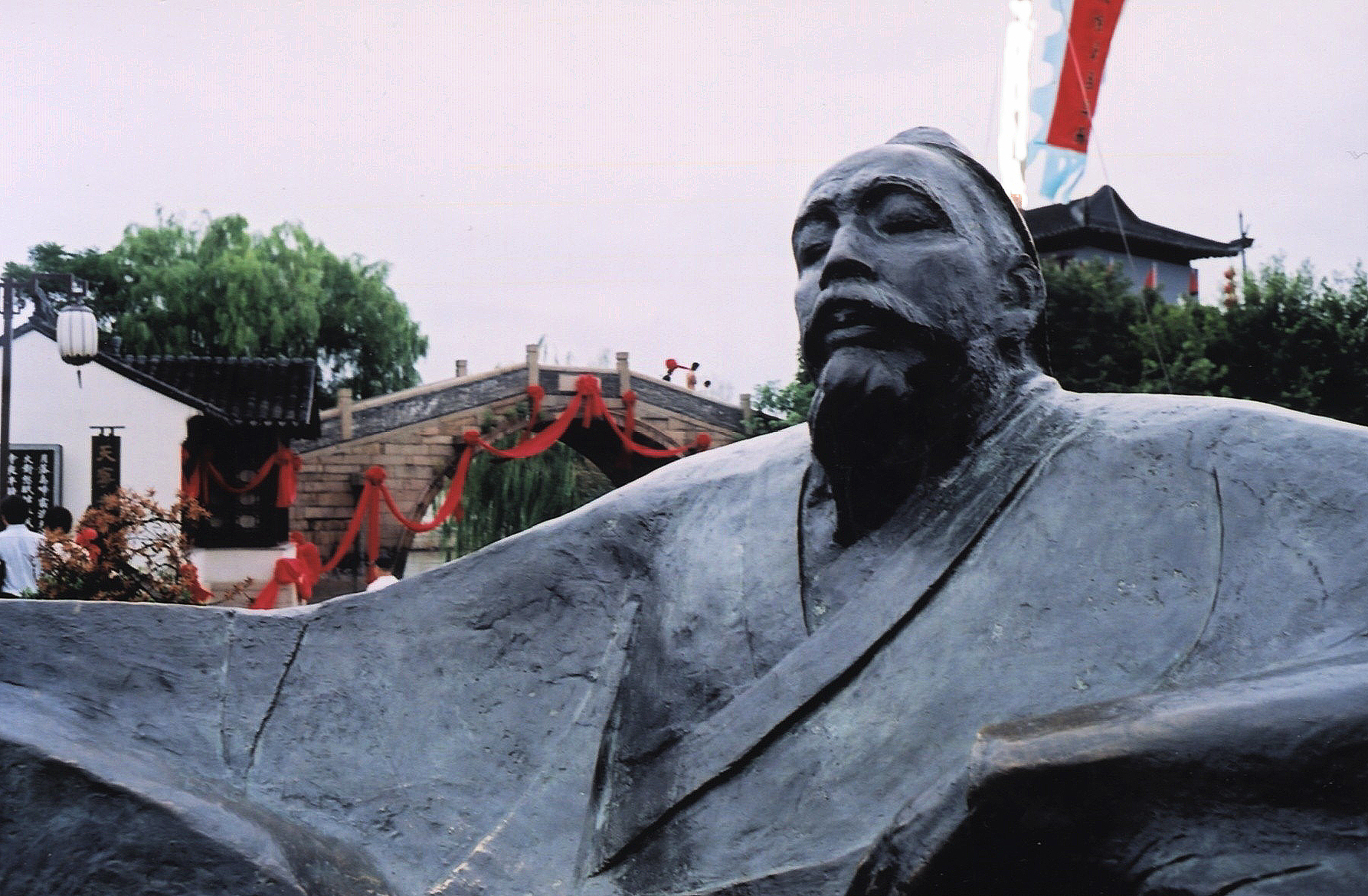
Statue of poet Zhang Ji at Maple Bridge

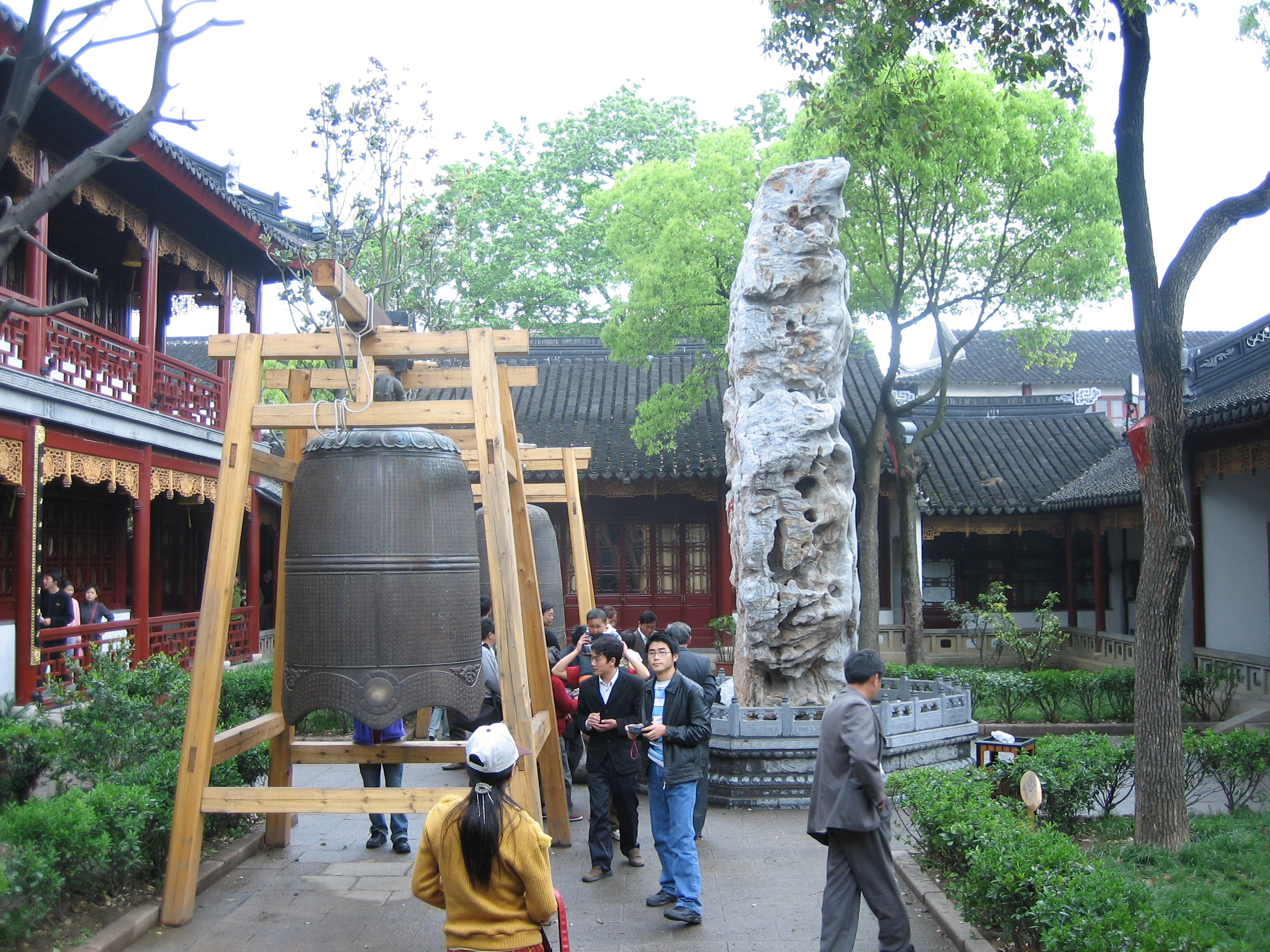
Bells

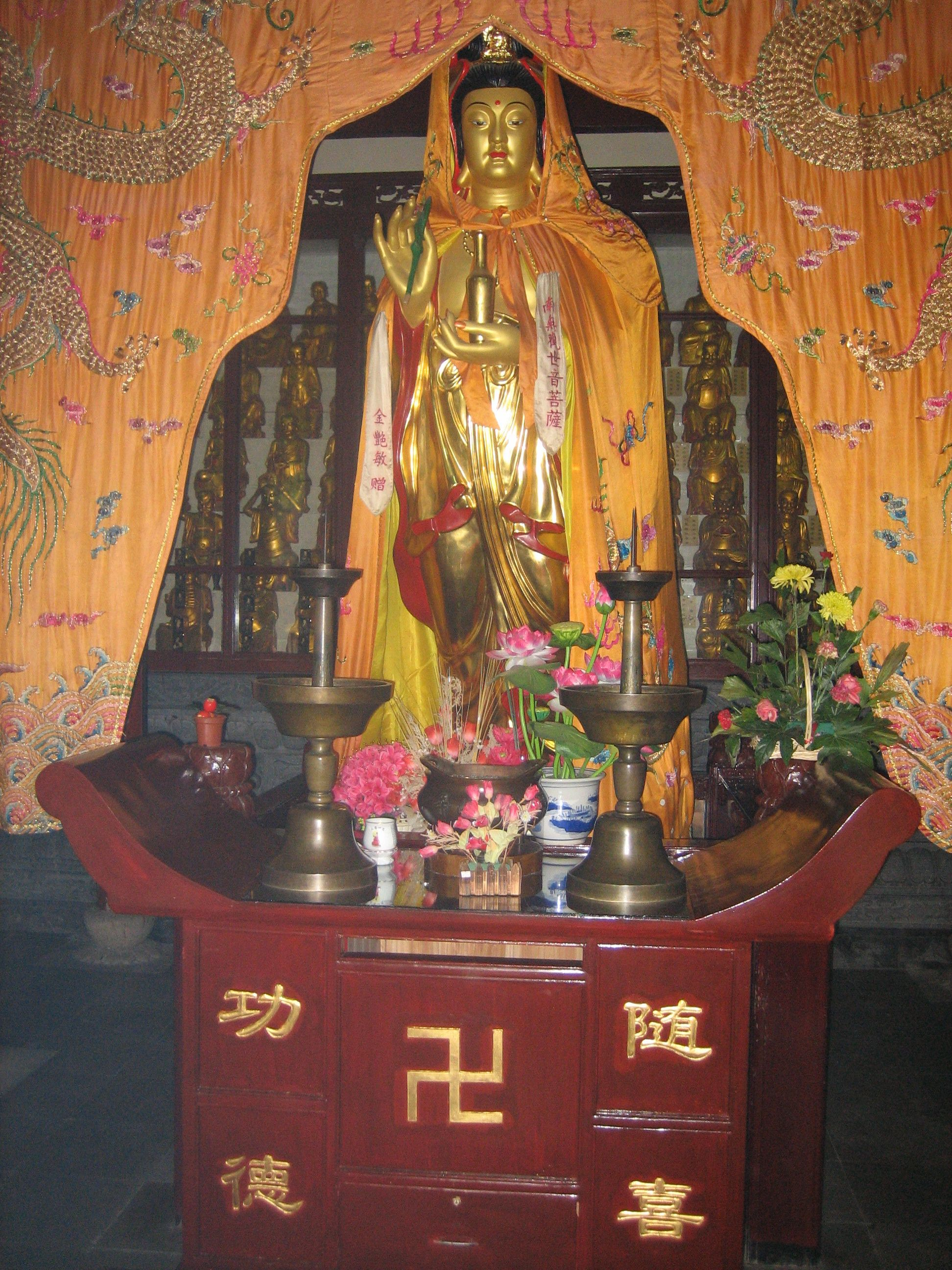
Statue in Hanshan Temple

Map

Hanshan Temple (Chinese: 寒山寺; pinyin: Hánshān Sì; lit. 'Cold Mountain Temple') is a Buddhist temple and monastery in Gusu District of Suzhou, Jiangsu, China. It is located at the town of Fengqiao (lit. Maple Bridge), about 5 kilometers (3.1 mi) west of Suzhou's old city. It was founded as Miaoli Puming Temple (Chinese: 妙利普明寺).

Traditionally, Hanshan Temple is believed to have been founded during the Tianjian era (502–519) of the reign of Emperor Wu of Liang, in the Southern and Northern dynasties period. The current name of the monastery derives from Hanshan, the legendary monk and poet. Hanshan and his disciple Shide are said to have come to the monastery during the reign of Emperor Taizong of Tang (627–649), where Hanshan became the abbot.

== The Bell of Hanshan ==
=== The poem ===
Hanshan Temple is famed in East Asia because of the poem "A Night Mooring by Maple Bridge" (楓橋夜泊), by Tang dynasty poet, Zhang Ji. The poem describes the melancholy scene of a dejected traveler, moored at night at Fengqiao, hearing the bells of Hanshan Temple:

月落烏啼霜滿天，
江楓漁火對愁眠。
姑蘇城外寒山寺，
夜半鐘聲到客船。
Yuè luò wū tí shuāng mǎn tiān,
Jiāng fēng yú huǒ duì chóu mián.
Gūsū chéngwài Hánshān Sì,
Yèbàn zhōngshēng dào kèchuán.

The moon descends, the crows scream, frost covers the sky.
The river maples and fishing boat lights fall to somber sleep.
Outside of old town Gusu sits the Hanshan Temple
The midnight bell rings to welcome pilgrimage boats.

To this day, the poem is still often read in China, Japan and Korea, and is part of the Chinese literature curriculum in both China and Japan. The ringing of the bell at Hanshan Temple on Chinese New Year's eve is a major pilgrimage and tourism event for visitors from these countries.

=== The bell ===
Two bells are currently used at Hanshan Temple, both dating from the late Qing dynasty when the temple was last rebuilt. One was forged in China in 1906, and the other was forged in Japan at around the same time. The dedication on the bell was written by Japanese Prime Minister Itō Hirobumi. The original Tang dynasty bell is believed by some (including Itō Hirobumi and modern Chinese statesman Kang Youwei) to have been taken to Japan in ancient times. These two factors have roused some nationalistic controversy among Chinese and Koreans (see, for example, this opinion).

A new 108 tonne bell commissioned by Hanshan Temple and produced by a foundry in Wuhan was completed in 2007 in order to replace the hundred-year-old Japanese bell. The new bell is 8.5 meters (28 ft) high and 5.2 meters (17 ft) in diameter at its widest. It is engraved with 70094 Chinese characters from Lotus Sutra.

== Hanshan Temple in Japan ==
A Hanshan Temple (pronounced kanzan-ji in Japanese) was established in Ōme, Tokyo, Japan in 1929.
