= Tendai Shereni =

Zimbabwean cricketer (born 1988)

Personal information
- Born: 5 September 1988 (age 38); Harare, Zimbabwe
- Source: ESPNcricinfo, 7 September 2016

Tendai Shereni (born 5 September 1988) is a Zimbabwean cricketer who played two List A matches for Mashonaland Eagles.
