= Tiantai Mountain =

Mountain in Zhejiang, China

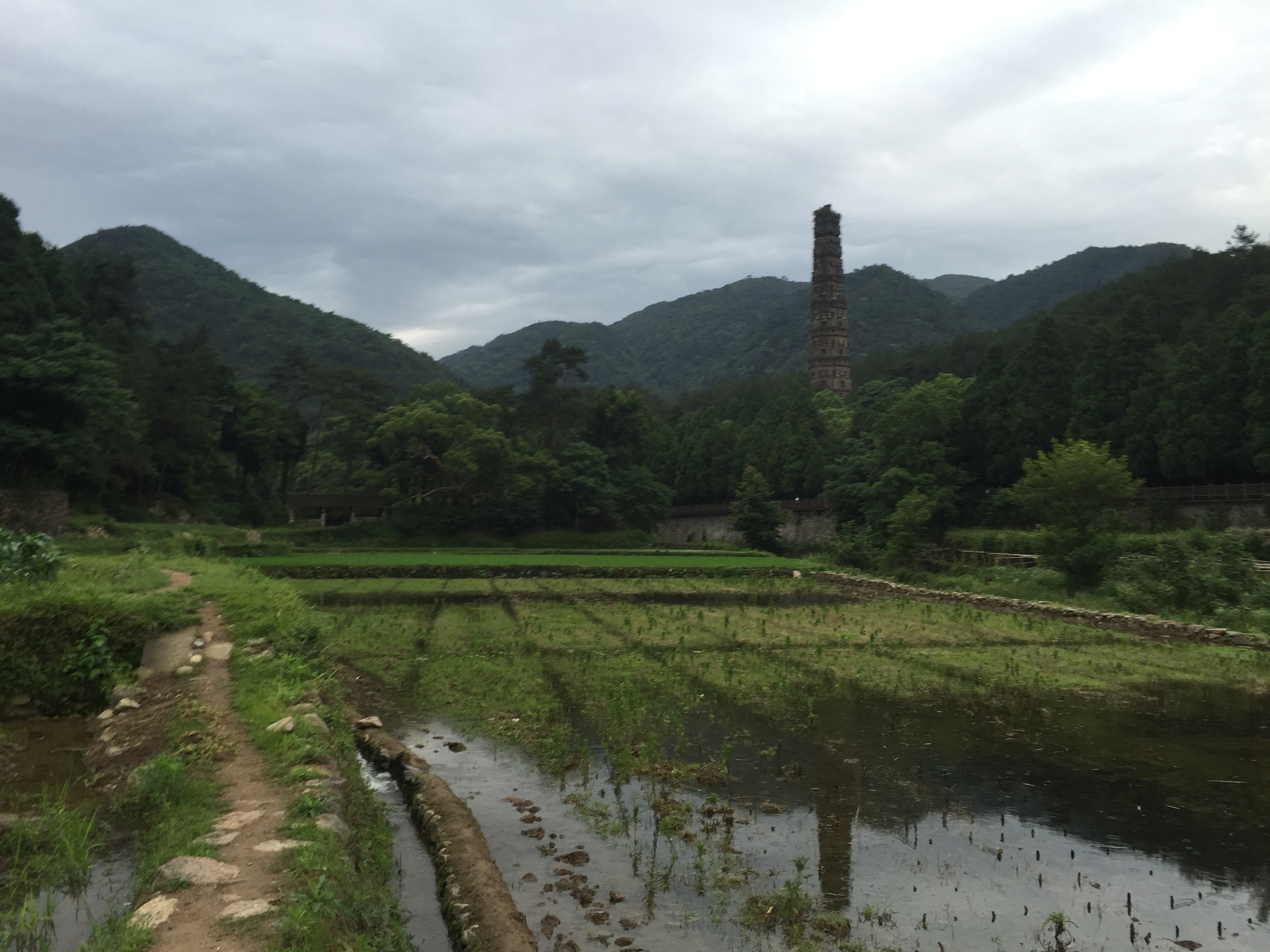
- Tiantai Mountain and the pagoda of Guoqing Temple, built in the 6th century CE.

Highest point
- Elevation: 1,138 m (3,734 ft)
- Coordinates: 29.178843°N 121.042213°E

Geography
- Location within Zhejiang
- Location: Tiantai County, Taizhou, Zhejiang Province, China
- Parent range: Zhejiang–Fujian Hills

Tiantai Shan
- Chinese: 天台山
- Hanyu Pinyin: PRC Standard Mandarin: Tiāntāi Shān; ROC Standard Mandarin: Tiāntái Shān
Transcriptions
Standard Mandarin
- Hanyu Pinyin: PRC Standard Mandarin: Tiāntāi Shān; ROC Standard Mandarin: Tiāntái Shān
- Bopomofo: PRC: ㄊㄧㄢ ㄊㄞ ㄕㄢ; ROC: ㄊㄧㄢ ㄊㄞˊ ㄕㄢ
- Gwoyeu Romatzyh: PRC: Tiantai Shan; ROC: Tiantair Shan
- Wade–Giles: PRC: T‘ien^{1}-t‘ai^{1} Shan^{1} ROC: T‘ien^{1}-t‘ai^{2} Shan^{1}
- Tongyong Pinyin: PRC: Tiantai Shan; ROC: Tiantái Shan
- Yale Romanization: PRC: Tyāntāi Shān; ROC: Tyāntái Shān
- MPS2: PRC: Tiāntāi Shān; ROC: Tiāntái Shān
- IPA: PRC: [tʰjɛ́n.tʰáɪ ʂán] ROC: [tʰjɛ́n.tʰǎɪ ʂán]

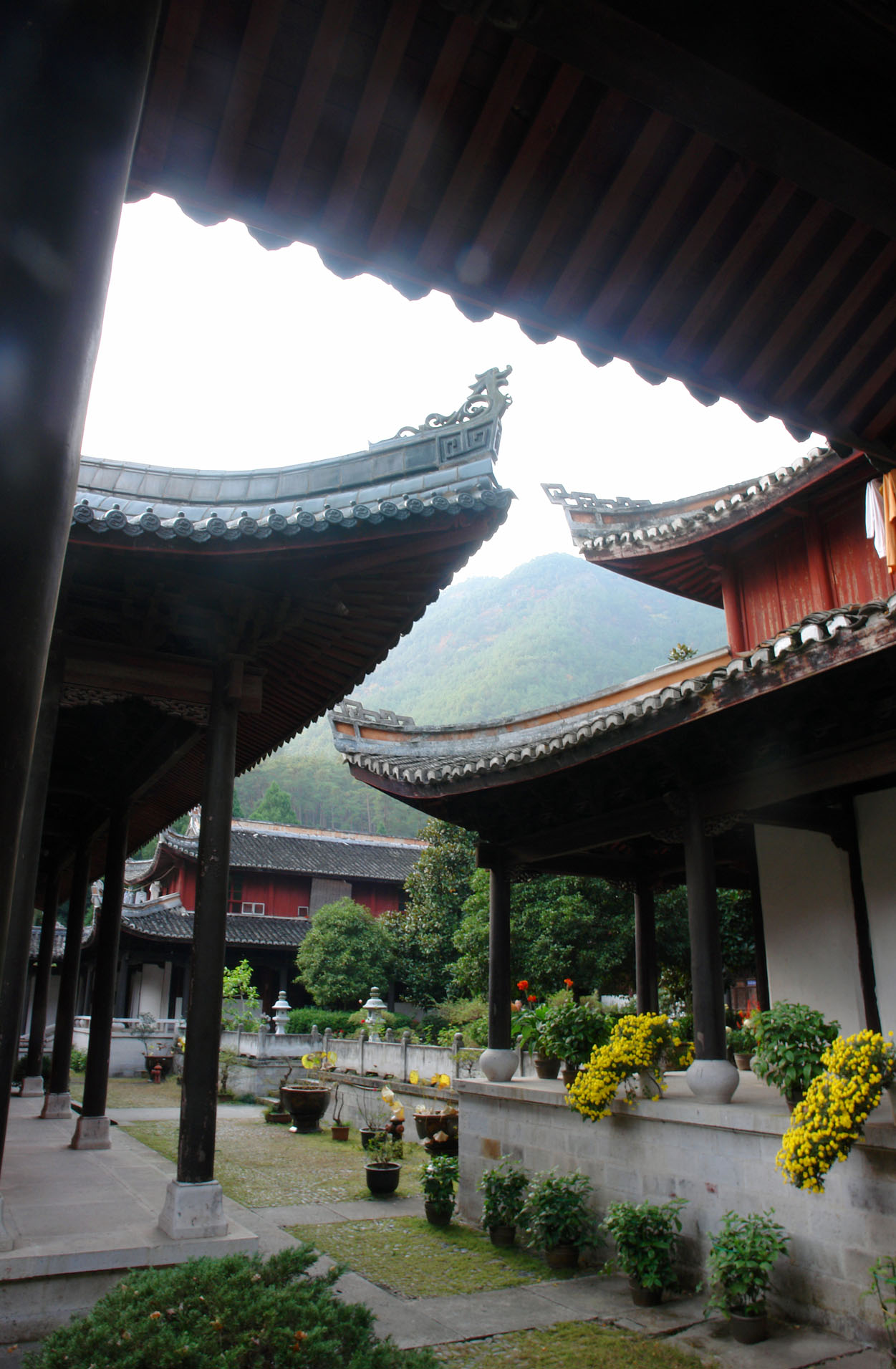
Guoqing Temple, built on Tiantai Mountain in 598 CE, renovated in the 18th century

Tiantai Mountain (also Tí Taî in the local language) is a mountain in Tiantai County, Taizhou, Zhejiang Province, China. Its highest peak, Huading, reaches a height of 1,138 meters (3,734 ft).

It was designated a scenic area in 1985, with an area of 105 km^{2}.

One of nine remaining wild populations of Seven-Son Flower (Heptacodium miconioides) is located on mount Tiantai.

== Legends ==
In the mythology of Traditional Chinese religion, the creator goddess Nüwa cut the legs off a giant sea turtle (Chinese: 鳌; pinyin: áo) and used them to prop up the sky after Gong Gong damaged Mount Buzhou, which had previously supported the heavens.

== Guoqing Temple ==
Guoqing Temple on the mountain is the headquarters of Tiantai Buddhism, and also a tourist destination. Tiantai, named for the mountain, is an East Asian Buddhist school of Mahāyāna Buddhism that developed in 6th-century China and focuses on the Lotus Sutra. The most prominent teacher of that school, Zhiyi, was based at Guoqing Temple.

== Ji Gong Temple ==
The mountain has a temple to the Song-era Chinese Buddhist monk Ji Gong at the Cave of Auspicious Mists that was associated with early modern fuji or "spirit writing" movements.

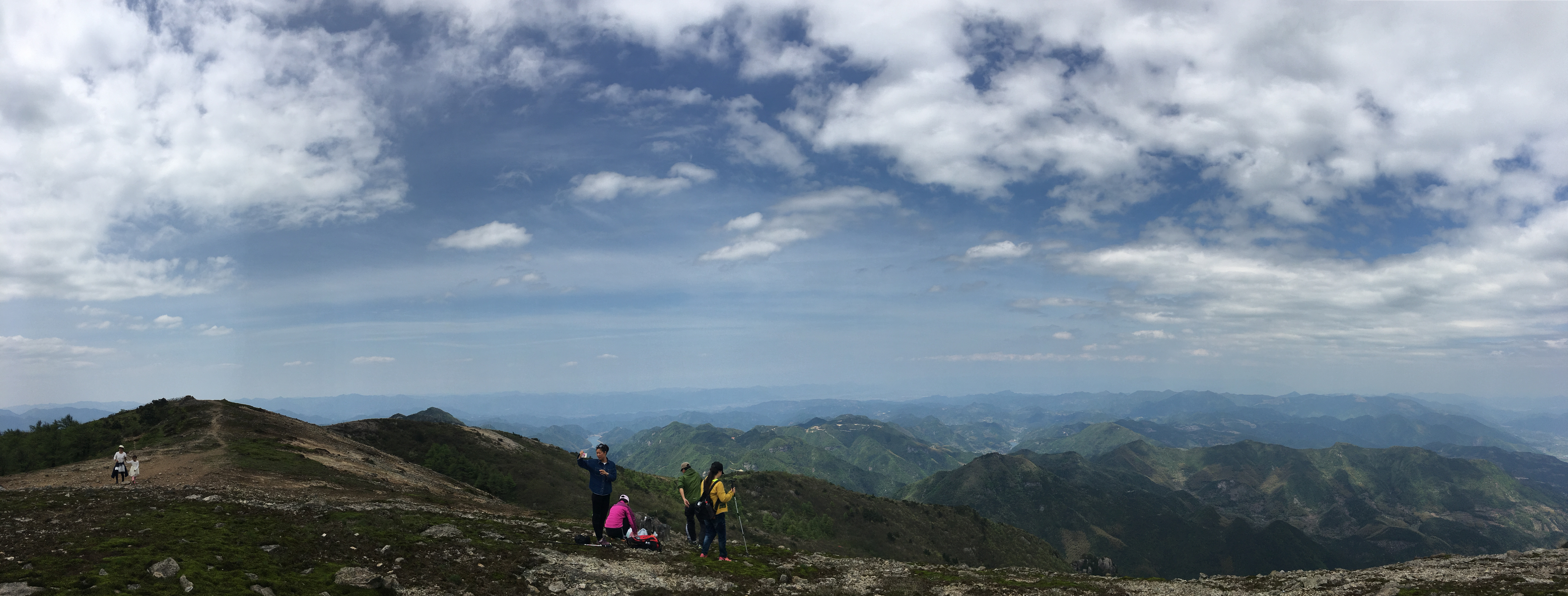
A panorama of Tiantai Mountain.

== Transport ==
- Tiantaishan railway station
