= Guoqing Temple =

Buddhist temple on Tiantai Mountain in Zhejiang, China

- 國清寺
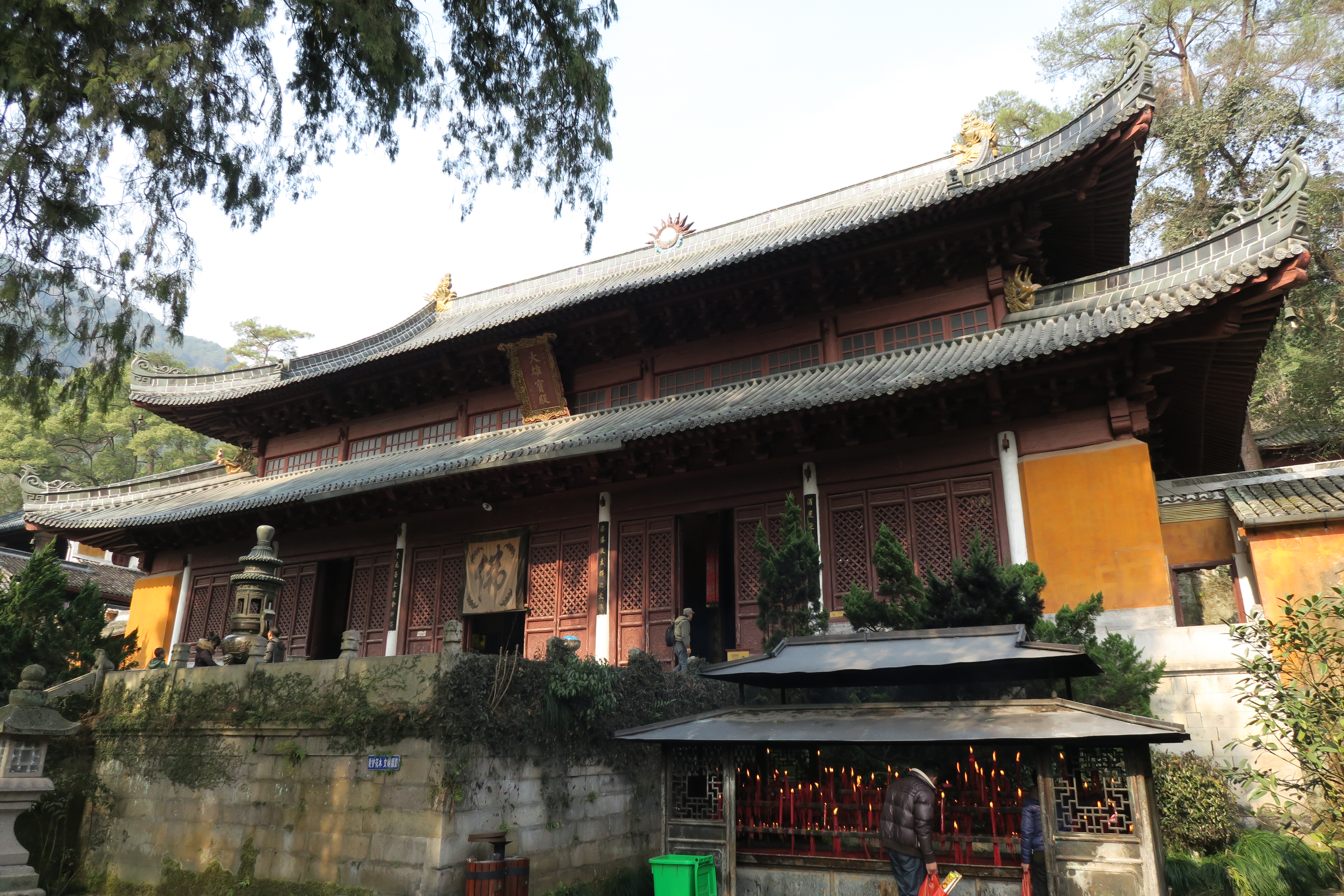
- The Guoqing Monastery on Tiantai Mountain.

- Location within Zhejiang Location within China

Religion
- Affiliation: Buddhism
- Sect: East Asian Buddhism–Tiantai
- Prefecture: Taizhou
- Province: Zhejiang
- Rite: Chinese
- Year consecrated: 598 CE

Location
- Country: China
- Prefecture: Taizhou
- Coordinates: 29.173141°N 121.042594°E

Architecture
- Style: Chinese architecture
- Founder: Emperor Yang of Sui
- Creator: Zhiyi
- Established: 598 CE
- Completed: 1734 (reconstruction)

The Guoqing Temple (simplified Chinese: 国清寺; traditional Chinese: 國清寺; pinyin: Guóqīng sì; Wade–Giles: Kuo-ch'ing Ssu, "Monastery of National Purity") is a Buddhist temple on Mount Tiantai, in Taizhou, Zhejiang Province, China. Originally built in 598 CE during the Sui dynasty, and renovated during the reign of the Qing Yongzheng Emperor (r. 1722–1735), the temple is located roughly 220 kilometres (140 mi) from the city of Hangzhou.

It was the initial site for the creation of the Tiantai school of Mahāyāna Buddhism, founded by the Chinese Buddhist teacher Zhiyi (538–597 CE). The temple covers an area of some 23,000 m^{2} (250,000 sq ft) and features 600 rooms in a total of 14 different halls, including the Mahavira Hall of Sakyamuni, the Hall of Five Hundred Arhats and the Hall of Monk Jigong. The exterior of the building features Chinese pagodas such as the Sui Pagoda, the Seven Buddha Pagoda, and the Memorial Pagoda of Monk Yi Xing (683–727 CE).

== History ==
In 598 CE, according to Master Zhiyi's last wish, the ruler of Sui dynasty (581–618 CE) built Guoqing Temple on Mount Tiantai. The Tiantai school was one of the first Chinese Buddhist schools to evolve from East Asian Buddhism after it was spread to China. Its founder, the Chinese Buddhist teacher Zhiyi (538–597 CE), lived on Mount Tiantai in Zhejiang for a long time—hence the name of the Tiantai school.

Under the Tang dynasty (618–907 CE), a large number of Japanese diplomats came to China. In the second year of the Zhenyuan Period (804 CE), the eminent Japanese Buddhist monk Saichō came with the diplomats. He studied the Tiantai doctrines in Guoqing Temple on Mount Tiantai introduced by Lu Chun, prefectural governor of Ningbo, Zhejiang. One year later, Saichō returned to Japan where he founded the Tendai school, based on the Tiantai teachings. Since then, the Guoqing Temple has been regarded as the cradle of the Tendai school in Japan.

=== Renovation of Guoqing Temple in the PRC era ===
In 1972, in order to restore diplomatic relations between China and Japan, the Japanese Prime Minister Kakuei Tanaka paid a visit to the People's Republic of China to which the Chinese government attached great importance and made proper arrangements.

During Tanaka's visit, he proposed a personal request to Prime Minister Zhou Enlai to worship at Guoqing Temple, as it was the ancestral temple of Tendai Buddhism in Japan. Tanaka's mother was a devout Buddhist from the Tendai school, who, before he visited China, had asked him to pay homage in the Guoqing Temple on her behalf.

After Tanaka's request, Zhou made inquiries to the relevant departments of Zhejiang province. However, he was told that the Guoqing Temple was unable to receive the Japanese guest at that time as it had not been repaired for many years. Tanaka was informed that Guoqing Temple was being renovated and that he would receive an invitation after it was completed.

Zhou Enlai ordered the renovation plan for Guoqing Temple almost immediately after the visit and stipulated that the temple was to be renovated by 1975. After receiving the notification document, the government of Tiantai County immediately established the Tiantai County Guoqing Temple Restoration Committee.

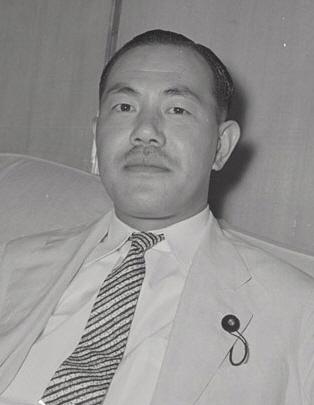
Japanese prime minister Kakuei Tanaka.

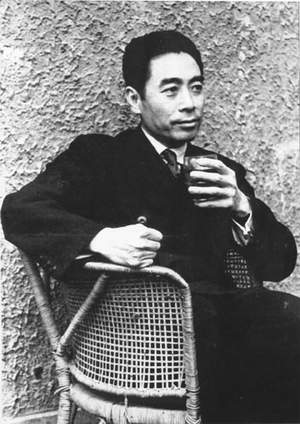
Chinese prime minister Zhou Enlai.

Because of the Cultural Revolution, some of the ancient buildings inside the temple had been either destroyed or damaged by the Red Guards for many years after the anti-religious campaign in Communist China. Many original statues of Buddha and musical instruments of the temple had been lost or vandalized. The Restoration Committee gave notice to all units and people from the entire county to find these cultural relics from the Guoqing Temple. A total of 323 out of 500 statues of the Five Hundred Arhats from the temple were found stored in a farm implements factory in Tiantai County, with a few having sustained some damage. A large bronze musical stone (铜磬) with inscriptions, which was cast during the Qing dynasty (1644–1911), was also found in another storehouse. In addition, horizontal inscribed boards (匾额) were also found in a cotton textile mill in the same county.

The State Council permitted the Restoration Committee to select and transport some Buddha statues and sacrificial vessels to Guoqing Temple. The committee went to the Palace Museum, Yonghe Lamasery, Beijing Cultural Relics Management Office, and other units of cultural relics to select Buddha statues and musical instruments as a replacement. A total of 109 cultural relics were selected and transported to Guoqing Temple, which were packed in 12 big cases.

As there were many cultural artifacts, some of them being huge Buddha statues, it was decided that they would be transported by train. The railway sector arranged two specialized train carriages to transport them. Among the relics, the largest was a statue of Sakyamuni Buddha dating to the Ming dynasty (1368–1644) which weighed 13 tonnes. After the renovation, the statue of Sakyamuni was placed in the middle of the Mahavira Hall, with statues of the Eighteen Arhats on both sides of the hall. A large bronze tripod from the Qianlong Period of the Qing dynasty (1644–1911) was placed in front of the Mahavira Hall. Two white marble lions were placed before the gate of the temple.

The original cultural relics from Guoqing Temple, some of which were damaged, were also restored. The Restoration Committee invited 78 surviving craftsmen to participate in the restoration of Guoqing Temple. During the restoration of the horizontal inscribed boards and couplets on the pillar of the temple, it was discovered that some characters on these horizontal inscribed boards and couplets had been lost or damaged.

To restore these incomplete cultural relics, the craftsmen used a unique skill, namely the "dried lacquer and ramie process" (干漆夹苎). The craftsmen used 13 raw materials, such as raw lacquer, ramie, colorful stone powder and tung oil to wrap and glue the linen and paint which they then polished repeatedly. Then, they painted auxiliary materials, such as cinnabar, and at last, they pasted gold foil. A total of 2.5 kilograms of gold was used in the restoration efforts.

In addition to renovating and repairing the original cultural relics, workers of the Restoration Committee elaborately designed some new sculptures and items inside the temple. Statues of two vajra warriors inside Guoqing Temple were also reshaped by the craftsmen. Besides, the altar (供桌) in the Mahavira Hall were also built by the craftsmen. They spent over 300 labor-hours on the carve patterns on the altar.

The temple's Free Life Pond is located at the southwest corner of the temple. Beside the pond are the Yuleguo ("fish's paradise") stele (鱼乐国) inscribed by Dong Qichang, a famous calligrapher from the Ming dynasty (1368–1644), as well as an imperial monument from the Qianlong Emperor. Ten black carp from Linghu Nuresery (菱湖渔场), Jiaxing, Zhejiang, was introduced into the pond.

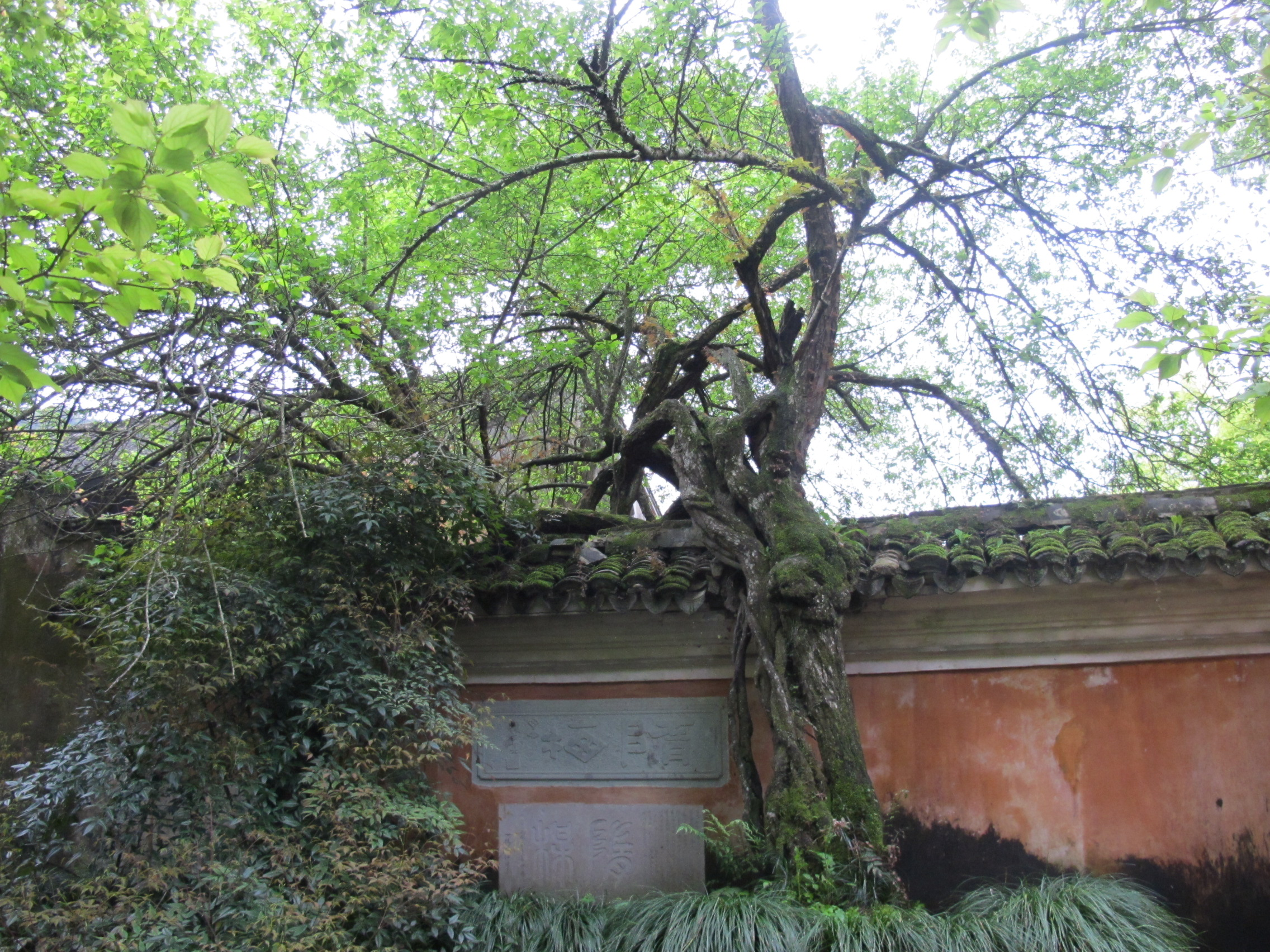
The ancient prune tree which was planted under the Sui dynasty (581–618 CE)

During the renovation, an ancient prune tree which was planted under the Sui dynasty (581–618 CE) over 1300 years ago in Guoqing Temple was revived. With unremitting efforts of the craftsmens, Guoqing Temple's renovation was completed as scheduled. On October 18, 1975, the first delegation of Japanese guests was received.

== National treasures ==
The large bronze tripod (青铜鼎) cast in Qianlong Period of the Qing dynasty (1644–1911) of China comes from the Palace Museum. Its shape is simple, unsophisticated and elegant. With two ears and three feet, it is 3.8 metres (12 ft) high overall, with the four big characters of "Sheng Shou Wu Jiang" (圣寿无疆). The tripod is decorated with three lions playing ball wheel of life, conch and other eight-treasure patterns. Exquisitely patterned it is of very high artistic vallce. Over 40 years ago, it was collected in the Palace Museum in Beijing. Now it belongs to Guoqing Temple more than a thousand miles away from Beijing.

The statue of Sakyamuni is a bronze statue made in the Ming dynasty (1368–1644). The 18 Arhat statues come from Yonghe Lamasery. They are high-quantity works carved with nanmu in the Yuan dynasty (1271–1368). The two white marble Chinese guardian lions come from Beijing and were carved in the Qing dynasty (1644–1911).

== Significance ==
From the Guoqing Temple, the Tiantai school of East Asian Buddhism originated and spread to both Korea and Japan during the Tang dynasty (618–907 CE). The tall brick Guoqing Pagoda built at the temple in the year 597 CE is still standing, making it one of the oldest surviving brick pagodas in China, after the 40 metres (130 ft) tall Chinese Songyue Pagoda built in 523 CE.

== Gallery ==
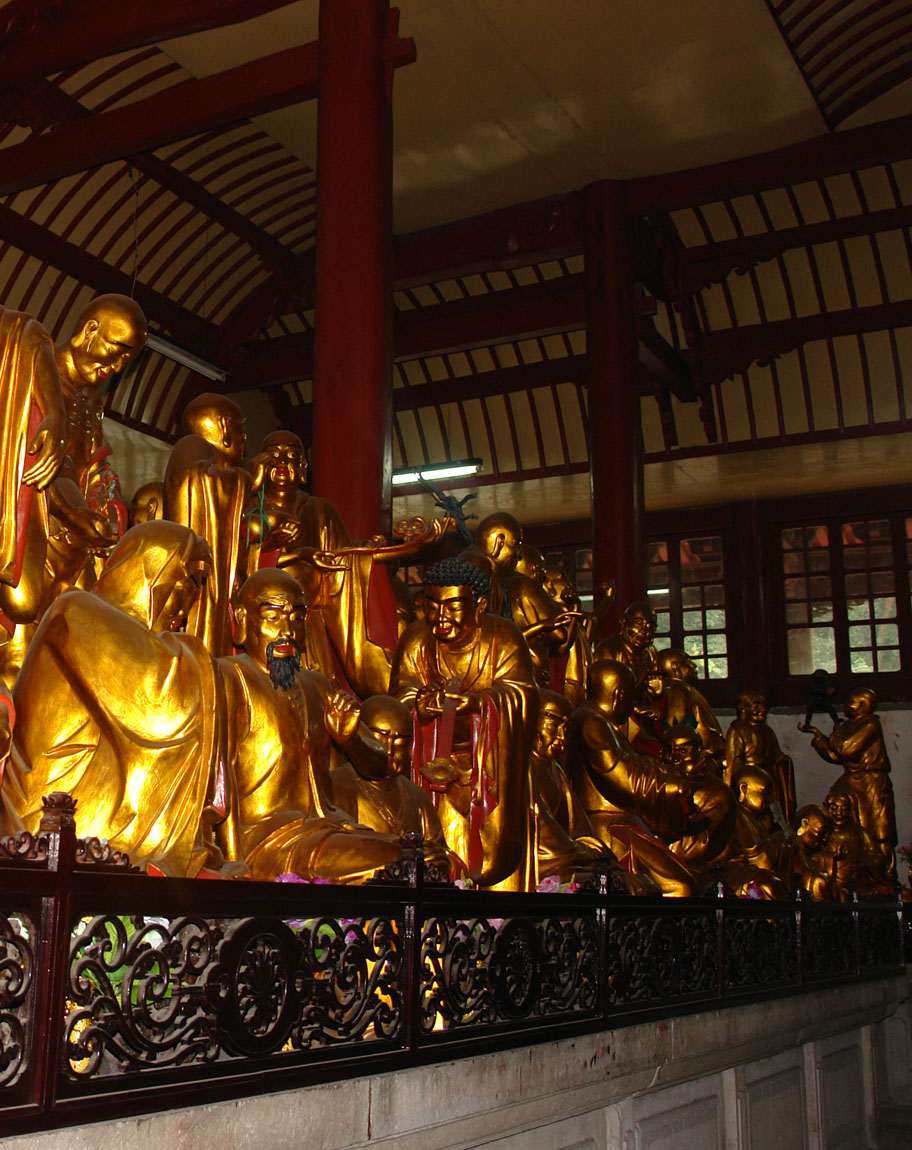
The Hall of Five Hundred Arhats

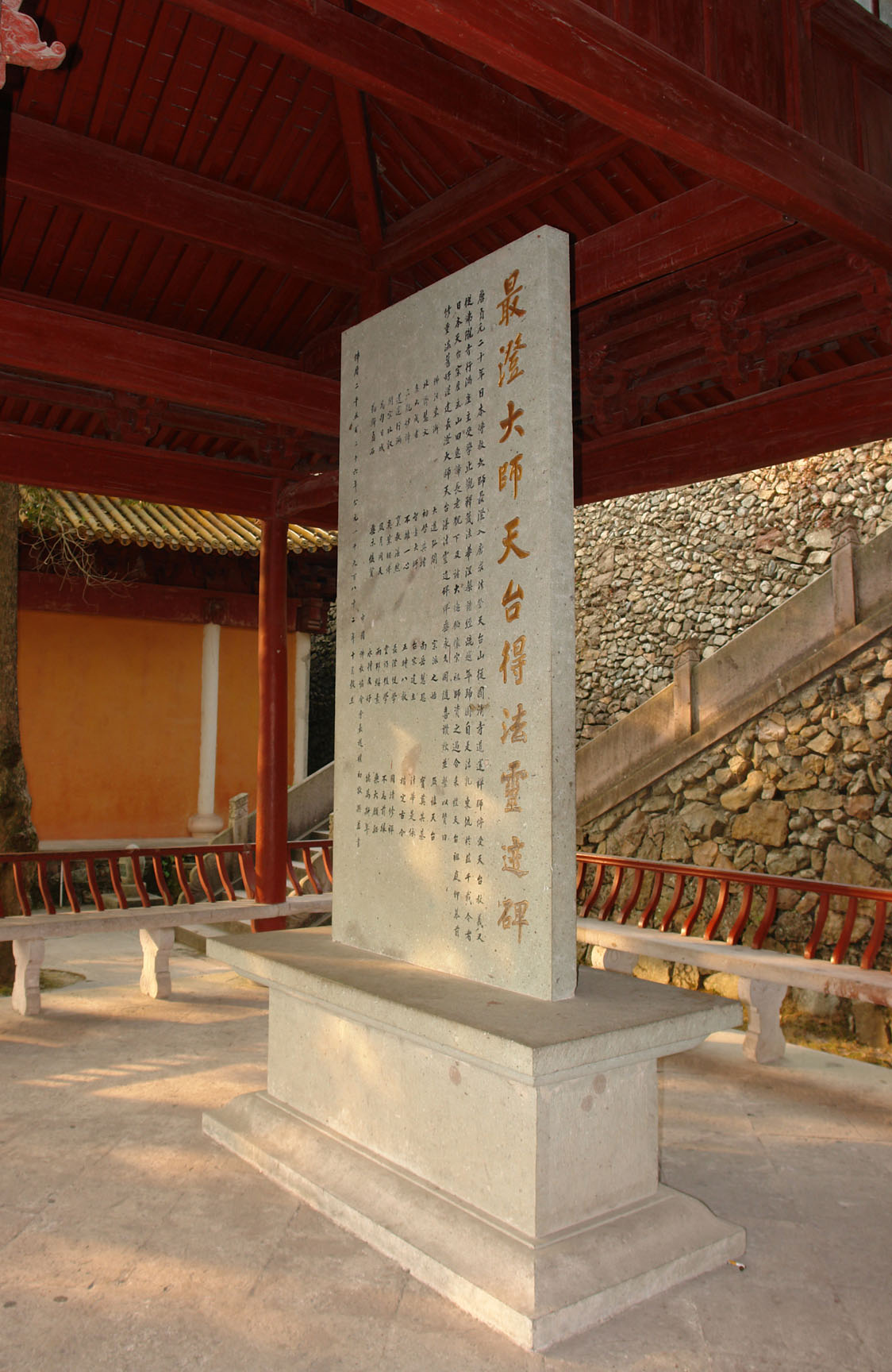
Guoqing Temple stele

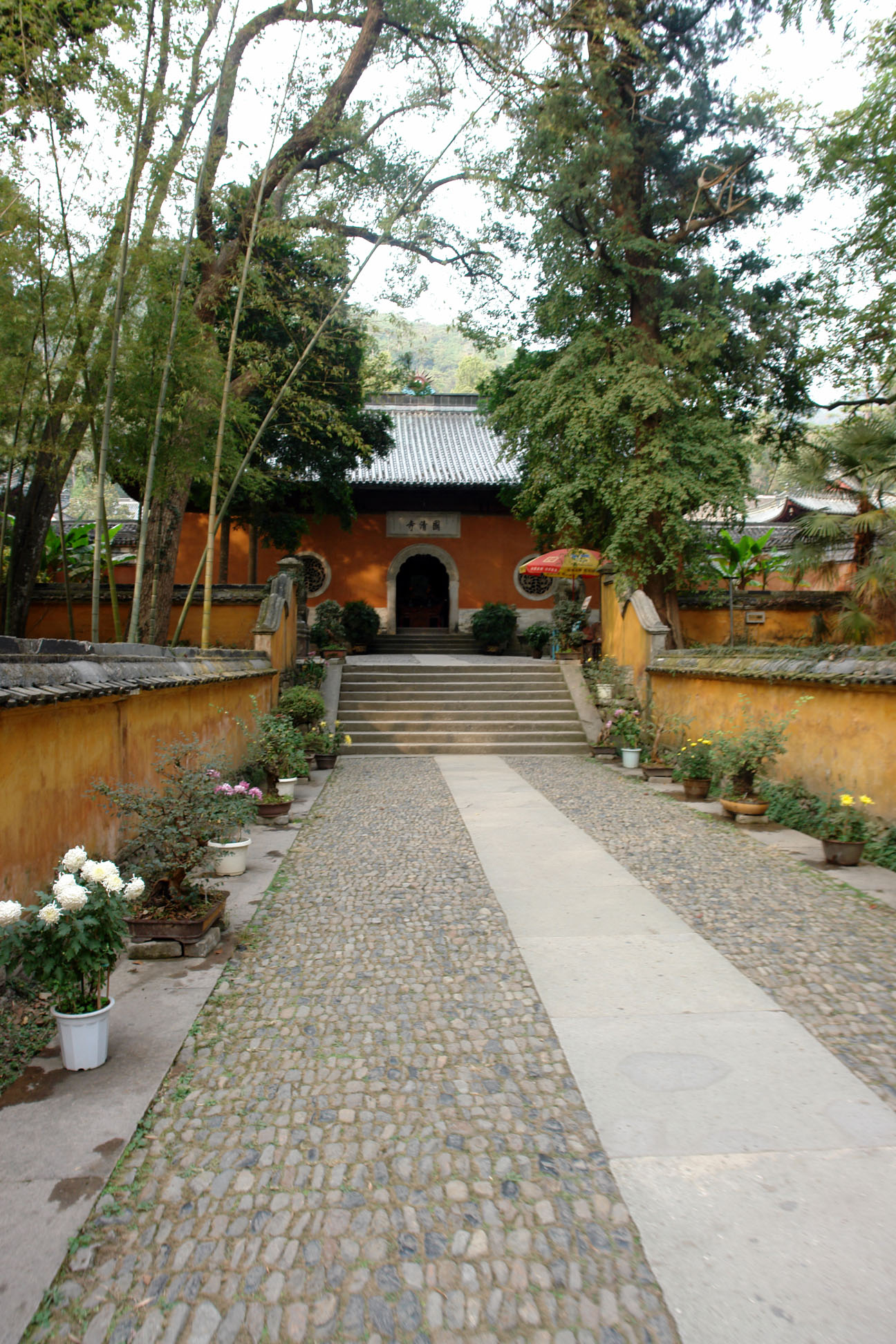

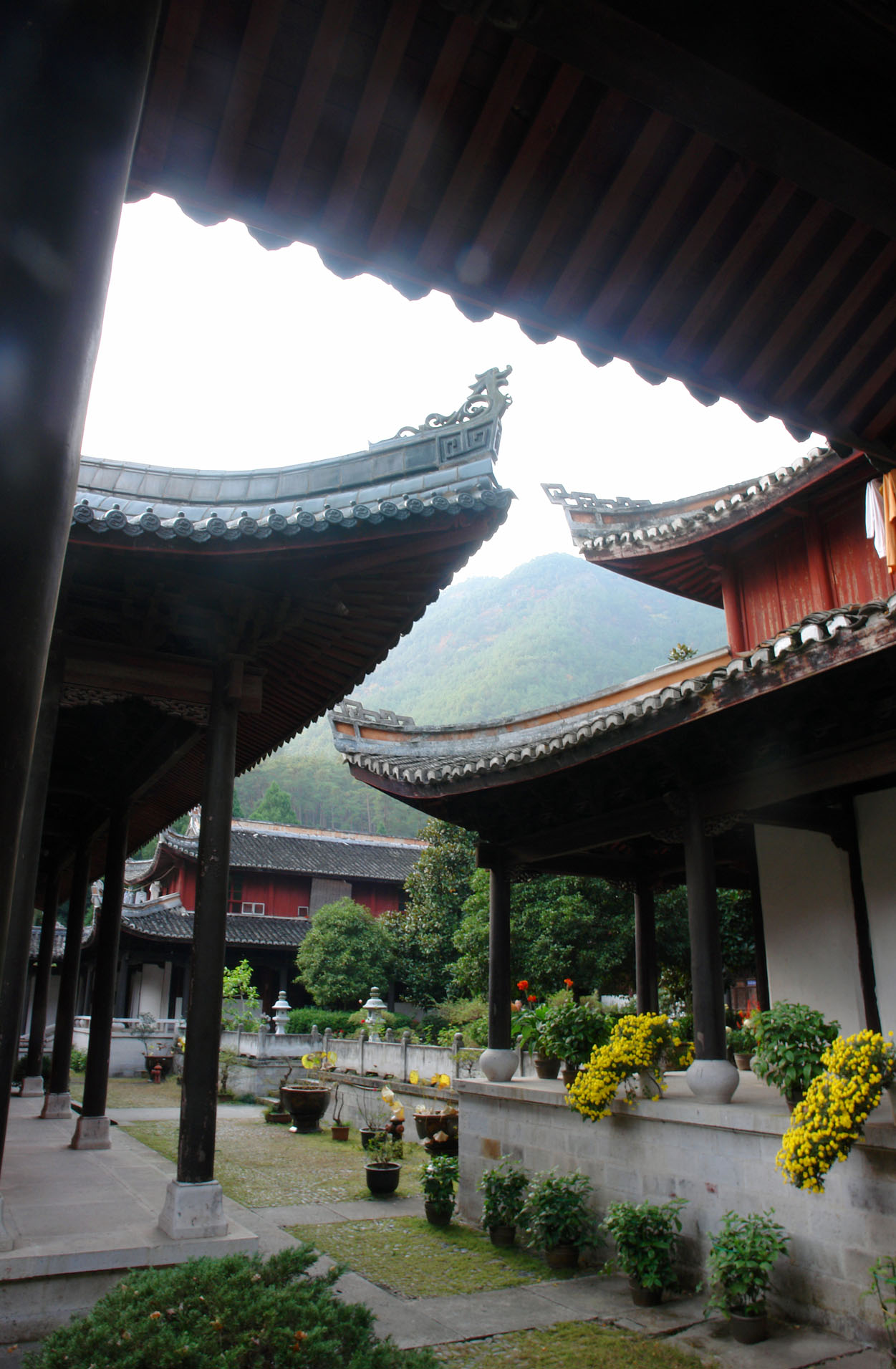

== See also ==
- The Taizhou Museum displays a three-dimensional model of the Guoqing Temple.
- Enryaku-ji
- Jiuhuashan
- List of Buddhist temples
- Tiantai Buddhism
  - Cheontae
  - Tendai
- Zhou Jichang
