= Guanding =

Chinese Buddhist monk

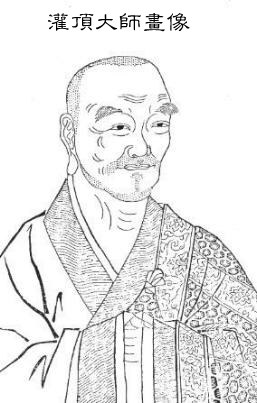
Traditional Chinese depiction of Guanding

Guanding (灌顶, 561–632 CE), also known as Shi Guanding (釋灌頂), was a Chinese Buddhist monk and exegete during the Sui dynasty (581–618). Guanding is traditionally recognized as the principal disciple and successor of Zhiyi (538–597), the eminent founder of the Tiantai school. He is also traditionally regarded as the fourth patriarch of the Tiantai tradition. Guanding played a decisive role in the preservation, organization, and transmission of Zhiyi's teachings, notably by ensuring that many of his master's oral discourses were systematically recorded and edited into written form. His efforts were instrumental in shaping the doctrinal and institutional legacy of Tiantai Buddhism.

Guanding was sometimes referred to by the name of his birthplace, Zhang'an (章安), and is thus often called the Master of Zhang'an (章安大師) or Zhang'an Guanding (章安灌顶) in historical records. Following Zhiyi's death, Guanding assumed responsibility for compiling his master's teachings, especially by writing down the "Three Great Works of Tiantai" (天台三大部), which is considered his major contribution to the establishment of Tiantai doctrine.

== Life ==
As a direct disciple of Zhiyi, the founder of the Tiantai tradition, Guanding played a critical role in systematizing and transmitting Tiantai doctrines after Zhiyi's death.

Guanding's (灌頂) secular surname was Wu, his courtesy name was Fǎyún (法雲). He was born in Zhang'an, Zhejiang (modern Linhai County, Zhejiang). His ancestral home was Yixing, Changzhou. Little is recorded about Guanding's early years, but he entered the Buddhist order at a young age after his father's death and quickly demonstrated exceptional devotion and intellectual capacity. He became one of Zhiyi's closest disciples, serving both as an attendant and a recorder of his teachings. He remained closely associated with Guoqing-si (National Purity Monastery) on Tiantai Mountain throughout his life.

In 583, he entered Guangzai Monastery (光宅寺) and became a disciple of Zhiyi. In 584, Zhiyi lectured on the Lotus Sūtra (法華經) at Guangzai Monastery. Guanding recorded and organized these lectures and wrote the Fahua Wenju (法華文句, Words and Phrases of the Lotus Sūtra). Later, when Zhiyi moved to Yiquan Monastery (玉泉寺) in Jingzhou, Guanding followed him there. In 591, he moved with Zhiyi to Chanzhong Monastery (禪眾寺) in Yangzhou. At that time, Zhiyi administered the bodhisattva precepts to Prince Jin, Yang Guang (who would later become Emperor Yang of the Sui), and was granted the title "Great Master Zhizhe" (智者大師). Afterward, Zhiyi returned to Mount Tiantai, and Guanding accompanied him.

In 597, Zhiyi died, and Guanding, along with his fellow disciple Zhi'yue (智越), continued to uphold the teachings and monastic order of the Tiantai lineage. Zhang'an Guanding continued to reside at Guoqing Monastery on Mount Tiantai, editing and organizing Zhiyi's lecture notes. The lecture notes from Zhiyi's teaching period at Yiquan-si (Jade Spring Monastery), after being recorded and compiled by Guanding, were transmitted to later generations as works such as the Fahua Xuanyi (法華玄義, The Profound Meaning of the Lotus Sūtra) and the Mohe Zhiguan (摩訶止觀, Great Calming and Contemplation).

In 602, he took up residence at the Huiri Practice Center (慧日道場). In 602–604 (仁壽二年至四年), Guanding traveled to the Sui court carrying annotated commentaries on the Lotus Sūtra authored by Zhiyi. His primary responsibility was to deliver and proofread these texts, rather than to lecture extensively. Nevertheless, while in the capital, Guanding engaged in doctrinal instruction and received favor and substantial rewards from Yang Guang, including gifts of luxury religious artifacts. In the early years of the Sui dynasty, Guanding continued his religious activities in the Jiangnan region. During the reign of Emperor Yang, around 607 (大業三年), he was summoned to Xianyang due to a controversy involving monks at Riyansi (日嚴寺), a major center of Buddhist debate founded by Yang Guang. On the journey, he encountered natural disasters and separation from companions. Subsequently, he was slandered and accused of practicing sorcery, resulting in his exile to the northern regions of Youji (幽蓟).

There are indications that Guanding engaged in doctrinal debate with Jizang (吉藏, 549–623), a leading figure of the Sanlun school (三論宗), who was renowned for his exceptional dialectical skills. Although Guanding's exact success in these debates is unclear, they demonstrate his active participation in the vibrant Buddhist scholastic culture of the Sui capital.

Later in life, Guanding returned to his monastic duties on Mount Tiantai, ordaining monks and continuing the propagation of Tiantai teachings. It was also during his last years that he wrote his two commentaries on the Great Nirvana sutra. His final years and death are not well documented, but he likely died around 632 the age of seventy-two. He was posthumously honored with the title "Venerable Master of Total Retention" (總持尊者).

Guanding's efforts in compiling, editing, and authoring of the main three Tiantai texts ensured that Zhiyi's complex system was transmitted to later generations in a coherent and structured form. Although Guanding himself did not significantly innovate upon Zhiyi's doctrines, his interpretive and organizational contributions subtly shaped how Tiantai thought was received and developed in subsequent centuries. Through his own commentarial writings, Guanding also participated in the development of Tiantai Buddhism, particularly in the integration of the Mahāparinirvāṇa Sūtra into the Tiantai framework

While he was not the actual head of the Tiantai community at the mountain during his life, Guanding later came to be seen as the true heir and successor to Zhiyi. He was later named the fourth patriarch of Tiantai. The historian Zhipan also compares his role to Ananda, Shakyamuni Buddha's attendant. Guanding's scholastic efforts thus solidified the foundational corpus of the Tiantai school. Today he is still revered as a transmitter and preserver of the Tiantai teaching.

== Works ==
=== Zhiyi's works ===
Guanding is most famous for being the actual author of three of Zhiyi's key works, known as the "Three Great Works of Tiantai" (天台三大部). Guanding compiled, wrote and edited these texts based on Zhiyi's lectures. The three great works are:

- Mohe zhiguan (摩訶止觀, The Great Calming and Contemplation)
- Fahua xuanyi (法華玄義, The Profound Meaning of the Lotus Sūtra)
- Fahua wenju (法華文句, The Words and Phrases of the Lotus Sūtra)

These compilations form the core canon of Tiantai scholasticism and meditation theory.

Guanding also composed an influential preface to the Mohe zhiguan, which contains the first outline of the lineage of the Tiantai school, connecting its Chinese line with the Indian tradition. This lineage is traced back to the Indian patriarch Nagarjuna, and begins in China with Huiwen, who is followed by Nanyue Huisi (Zhiyi's teacher). A unique feature of this lineage history is that there is no direct line of teacher-disciple transmission from Nagarjuna to Huiwen. Instead, Huiwen is said to have read the Dà zhì dù lùn (a work traditionally attributed to Nagarjuna in China) and then to have practiced meditation based on its teachings. In this way, he is said to have attained insight into the nature of things, as Nagarjuna had done.

Guanding also edited and in some cases completed other works by Zhiyi. For example, Guanding completed Zhiyi's commentary to the Vimalakīrti-sūtra (Weimojie suoshuo jing 維摩詰所説經), which was incomplete on Zhiyi's death, missing commentary on the six chapters after chapter nine. Guanding added three fascicles to this commentary, completing the work.

=== Original works ===
In addition to his editorial work, Guanding himself authored eight distinct compositions, totaling forty-nine fascicles. Among his own writings are:

- Dàbān Nièpán-jīng Xuányì (大般涅槃經玄義, "The Profound Meaning of the Mahāparinirvāṇa Sūtra" T.1765)
- Commentary on the Nirvāṇa Sūtra (Da Ban Niepan Jing Shu 大般涅槃經疏, T.1767)
- Guanxinlun shu (觀心論疏, "Commentary on the Treatise on Contemplating the Mind")
- The Essential Meaning of the Eight Teachings of Tiantai (Tiantai Bajiao Dayi)
- Guoqing bai lu (國清百錄, "One Hundred Records of Guoqing Monastery"), this work has been translated into English by BDK publications as The Hundred Records of the Temple of National Purity. It provides information on early Tiantai monastic practices and the development of Guoqing Monastery as the school's central site.
- Zhizhe dashi biechuan (智者大師別傳, "The Supplementary Biography of Great Master Zhizhe")

== Interpretation of the Great Nirvana Sutra ==
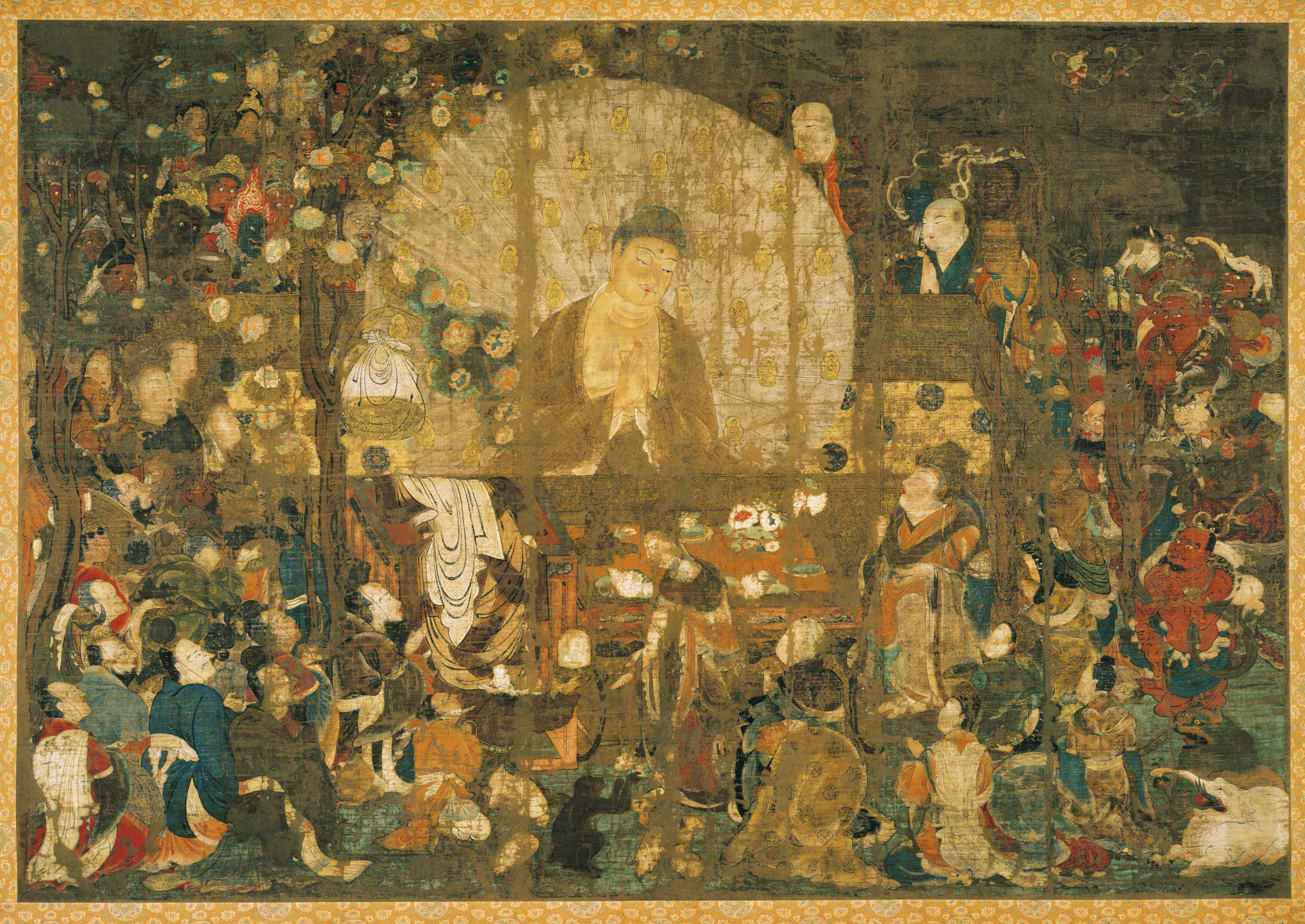
A scene from the Nirvana Sutra, Shakyamuni's vajra body arising from his golden tomb, 11th century Heian period Hanging scroll, Kyoto National Museum.

According to Guo Chaoshun, the commentaries on the Great Nirvāṇa Sūtra (Mahāyāna Mahāparinirvāṇa Sūtra), written towards the end of his life, are the "only works in which Guanding possibly expresses his independent Buddhist thinking", though he always presents his work as being "a narrow glimpse into the Master’s [Zhiyi's] intention".

=== The meaning of Great Nirvāṇa ===
Guanding sees the term Mahāparinirvāṇa (大般涅槃 Dàbōnièpán) as containing multiple layers of meaning which communicate the highest and ultimate state of the Buddha's Nirvāṇa. Glosses include “extinction,” “tranquility,” “cessation,” “release,” “liberation,” “no rebirth,” “nonexistence,” “non-self,” “elimination of suffering,” etc. Guanding also critiques the rendering of the term as “great extinction” indicating non-being or elimination, since it would entail a distortion of the intent of the Mahāparinirvāṇa Sūtra, which argues that the Buddha's Nirvana was not ultimately an actual moment of extinction (as the provisional teachings state). As a non-dual reality, Great Nirvana is also the Mahayana “Non-abiding Nirvana”, which includes the Trikāya (Triple Buddha Body): Dharmakāya (Dharma-body), Sambhogakāya (Reward-body), and Nirmāṇakāya (Transformation-body). As such, Guanding sees Mahāparinirvāṇa as indicating a truth which transcends all dualistic categories and which also embodies permanence, bliss, self and purity. Thus Guanding states:

The meaning of "extinction" is like this: Extinction means stillness; stillness ends birth and death; it is the movement of sentient beings toward Buddhahood... From stillness comes permanence, from permanence comes bliss, and thus extinction is also self and purity.

While including these positive qualities, Great Nirvana is also transcends all categories, thus Guanding glosses it as “non-existence yet not non-existence”. However, even this meaning is ultimately transcended, as Guanding then links Great Nirvana to Samsara itself and to the Threefold Truth of Tiantai. Thus, Guanding affirms the non-duality of Nirvāṇa and Samsāra, seeing Nirvana as an immanent and ever-present reality in all things:

Just as one sees a person and recognizes the shadow, so too is it with all conditioned things. Nirvāṇa is not separate from them; even amid impermanence and suffering, Nirvāṇa is always present.

Guanding analyzes the immanence of Great Nirvana by explaining how it extends into the non-obstruction and mutual interpenetration of the threefold Buddha body (Trikāya), with the threefold truth and threefold contemplation (and threefold wisdom) taught in Tiantai, all of which "are precisely Great Nirvana"... "they are not one and the same, yet neither are they different". He also explains how the three bodies (Dharmakāya, Sambhogakāya, and Nirmāṇakāya) and the three wisdoms, together forming a unity, correspond respectively to body, mind, and function. This is further mapped into further relationships with the three aspects of buddha-nature. Thus in this schema, Great Nirvana has the following threefold aspect:

- Body, which is linked with essential nature and the Dharmakāya
- Mind which corresponds to wisdom and Sambhogakāya
- Function which corresponds to practice, and the Nirmāṇakāya

Guanding also argues that nirvana pervades all realms of existence, and that each experience of peace and joy in all realms is a kind of nirvana. In spite of this, Nirvana is also described as "nameless" (wuming 無名) and beyond all conception. However, according to Guanding, this namelessness is not the same in all of the four teachings. In the first three teachings (Tripitaka, Shared, Distinct), namelessness is still relative and dualistic, based on different forms of negation and rejection of names and words. Meanwhile, the Complete or Well-rounded teaching of the Lotus Sutra presents the true namelessness which transcends all duality, as well as all affirmation and negation. As such, it does not negate name and form (nāmarūpa), but transcends them while also including them for the sake of convention.

Even this kind of namelessness must be transcended however, and the final realization of Nirvana is labeled as the “Transcendent Name” (絕名) by Guanding. This truly ineffable non-dual reality goes beyond all names and forms, even "nameless" and "non-nameless" or any views about relying on or letting go of name and form, "it means the mind is completely free, not dependent on or tied to anything whatsoever." This is the true Great Nirvāṇa, the Buddhahood that does not abandon the beings of the nine realms which is based on the principle of the Middle Way's Complete and Profound Interfusion (中道圓融義).

Guanding describes the different levels of understanding Great Nirvana as follows:

If one sees Nirvana as the supreme good, then one is still within the realm of the Provisional Teaching. If Nirvana is seen as separate from the worldly, that too belongs to the Shared Teaching. If Nirvana is viewed as both existent and empty, that is the Distinct Teaching. But if Nirvana is seen as neither empty nor existent, as both arising and ceasing, as both worldly and transcendental, then this is the Perfect Teaching. Thus, the Transcendent Name lies in the ability to affirm and deny without clinging to either.

=== The Essence and Function of Nirvāṇa ===
Guanding discusses the essence (ti 體) or true aspect of Great Nirvāṇa from five perspectives: “purity of nature”, “dharma-body”, “one truth”, “non-production and non-extinction”, and “correct nature”. Initially, he criticizes the traditional view of some early figures who claimed that the essence of Nirvāṇa is necessarily a single dharma (一法). In contrast, Guanding advocates that only through multiple modes of explanation can the true aspect of nirvāṇa be properly revealed.

The five perspectives can be summarized as follows:

- "Purity of nature" (xingjing 性淨) refers to the inherent existence of nirvāṇa which is “neither cultivated nor attained, neither produced nor the result of karma" and has [always] existed.
- "Dharma-body" (fashen 法身) is the inconceivable body of one who realizes nirvāṇa, “the indestructible, vajra essence; it is neither form nor non-form, yet is called truly good and wondrous.”
- "One truth" (yidi 一諦) is the non-dual perspective in which birth-and-death, non-arising, the infinite, and non-production are one. It means that “within the one, there are infinite [truths]; within the infinite, there is the one; it is inconceivable and indescribable, but to facilitate easier understanding one is forced to distinguish it.”
- “Non-production and non-extinction” (不生不滅), all phenomena are neither created nor destroyed, they do not arisen and do not cease.
- "Correct nature" (zhengxing 正性) is that it is “neither cause nor caused cause, neither effect nor effected effect; this is called correct nature.”

Regarding the Function (yong 用) of Nirvana, Guanding explains how it is “omniscient wisdom” (sarvākārājñāna, 一切種智), which can be understood in a fourfold way:

- As the function of non-duality and non-distinction, which Guanding describes as "by means of the principle of the Middle Way, all dualistic oppositions are negated, and within non-duality the Buddha’s omniscient wisdom is established."
- As the function of actuality within phenomena, which means that "the function of Nirvāṇa does not depart from worldly dharmas; precisely within the phenomenal appearances of the world, the true and non-dual principle is manifested."
- As the function of responding to conditions without obstruction which "arises responsively according to the conditions [of sentient beings], applying teachings appropriate to beings’ capacities, without any obstruction, exercising spontaneous freedom."
- As the function of expedient means and skillful means, which teaches the Dharma in many ways and establishes countless methods, "as medicine is administered appropriate to the illness".

Finally, when it comes to the teaching aspect of the Nirvana Sutra, Guanding analyzes the meaning of Nirvana according to all the four teachings, but ultimately he sees the Nirvana Sutra as being based on the Well-rounded or Complete Teaching of the Lotus Sutra which fully encompasses and also transcends the previous three teachings. He sees the Nirvana Sutra's core teaching as being the "eternity" and "abiding" (常住) nature of Buddhahood and buddha-nature, which is a teaching that, as in the Lotus Sutra, "abandons the partial and reveals complete reality" and "opens the partial to reveal complete reality".
