= David W. Chappell =

David Wellington Chappell (1940–2004) was a professor of Buddhist studies whose specialties were Chinese Buddhist traditions (esp. Tiantai) and interreligious dialogue. After receiving a B.A. from Mount Allison University and a B.D. from McGill University, he completed a Ph.D. in the history of religions at Yale University. His subsequent teaching career included three decades as a professor of religion at the University of Hawaii, where he founded the journal Buddhist-Christian Studies in 1981, edited it through 1985, then helped found the Society for Buddhist-Christian Studies in 1987. His publications include Buddhist and Taoist Practice in Medieval Chinese Society, T'ien-t'ai Buddhism: An Outline of the Fourfold Teachings, Buddhist Peace Work: Creating Cultures of Peace, and Unity in Diversity: Hawaii's Buddhist Communities.

After retiring from the University of Hawaii, he taught comparative studies at Soka University of America and was actively engaged in Buddhist-Muslim dialogue in Asia, Europe, and North America.

== Personal life ==
Originally from Canada, Chappell later lived in Laguna Hills, California, where he died in 2004. He had five children with his wife Stella.

== Published works ==
- Chappell, David W. (1987). 'Is Tendai Buddhism Relevant to the Modern World?' in Japanese Journal of Religious Studies 1987 14/2-3. Source: ; accessed: Saturday August 16, 2008
- Chappell, David W., Buddhist Peacework -- Creating Cultures of Peace, Wisdom Publications, 2000. ISBN 086171167X https://www.amazon.com/Buddhist-Peacework-Creating-Cultures-Peace/dp/086171167X/
