= Tiantai =

School of Mahayana Buddhism established and practiced in China

Chinese name
- Chinese: 天台
- Hanyu Pinyin: PRC Standard Mandarin: Tiāntāi; ROC Standard Mandarin: Tiāntái
- Literal meaning: from "Tiantai [Heavenly Terrace] Mountain"
Transcriptions
Standard Mandarin
- Hanyu Pinyin: PRC Standard Mandarin: Tiāntāi; ROC Standard Mandarin: Tiāntái
- Bopomofo: PRC: ㄊㄧㄢ ㄊㄞ; ROC: ㄊㄧㄢ ㄊㄞˊ
- Gwoyeu Romatzyh: PRC: Tiantai; ROC: Tiantair
- Wade–Giles: PRC: T‘ien^{1}-t‘ai^{1} ROC: T‘ien^{1}-t‘ai^{2}
- Tongyong Pinyin: PRC: Tiantai; ROC: Tiantái
- Yale Romanization: PRC: Tyāntāi; ROC: Tyāntái
- MPS2: PRC: Tiāntāi; ROC: Tiāntái
- IPA: PRC: [tʰjɛ́n.tʰáɪ] ROC: [tʰjɛ́n.tʰǎɪ]
Wu
- Romanization: Tí Tai
Yue: Cantonese
- Yale Romanization: Tīn-tòih

Vietnamese name
- Vietnamese alphabet: Thiên Thai
- Chữ Hán: 天台

Korean name
- Hangul: 천태
- Hanja: 天台
Transcriptions
- Revised Romanization: Cheontae

Japanese name
- Kanji: 天台
Transcriptions
- Romanization: Tendai

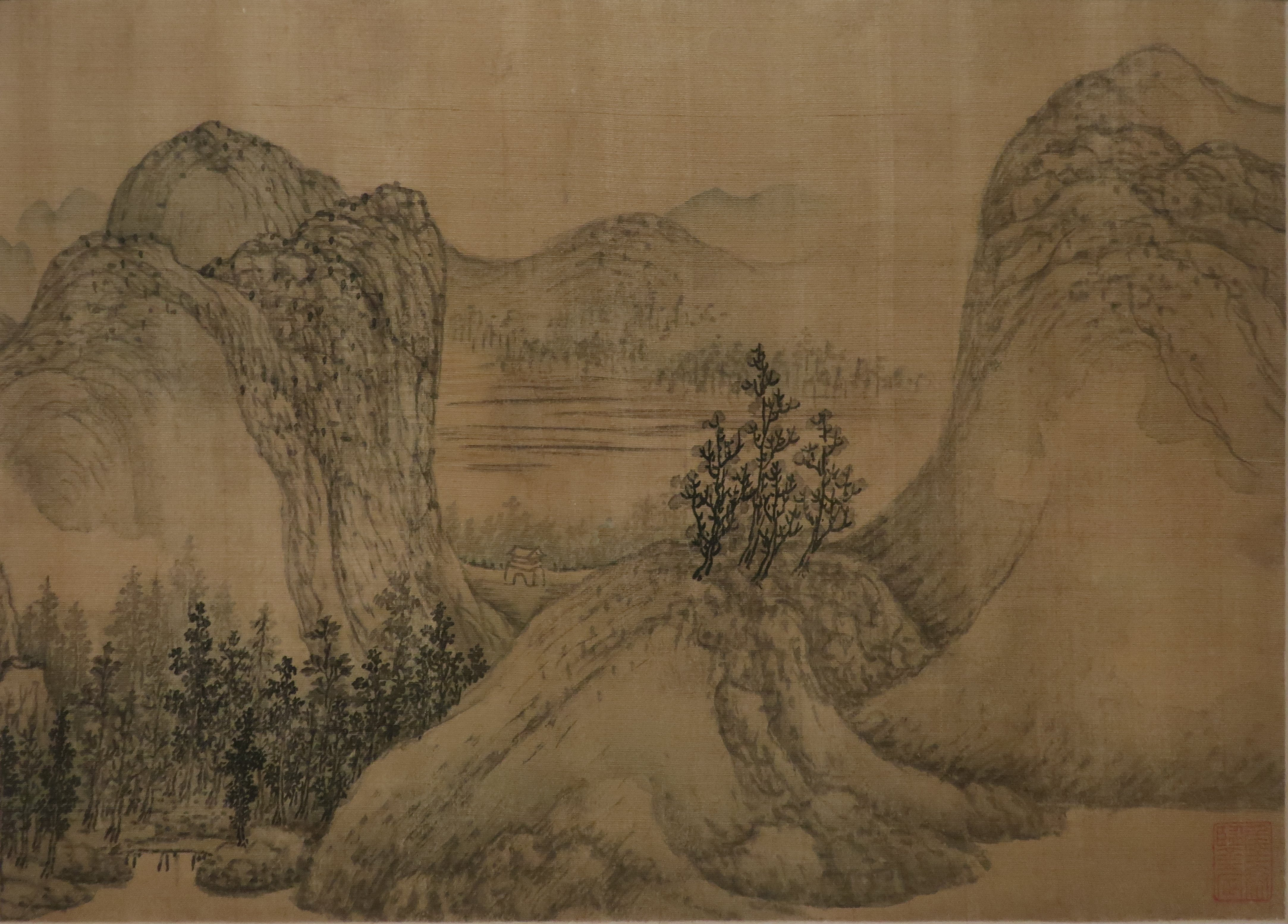
Mount Tiantai by Wu Bin, 1605, Honolulu Museum of Art

Tiantai or T'ien-t'ai (Chinese: 天台; pinyin: PRC Standard Mandarin:Tiāntāi) is an East Asian Buddhist school of Mahāyāna Buddhism that developed in 6th-century China. Drawing from earlier Mahāyāna sources such as Madhyamaka, founded by Nāgārjuna, who is traditionally regarded as the first patriarch of the school, Tiantai Buddhism emphasizes the "One Vehicle" (Ekayāna) doctrine derived from the influential Lotus Sūtra, as well as the philosophy of its fourth patriarch, Zhiyi (538–597 CE), the principal founder of the tradition. Brook Ziporyn, professor of ancient and medieval Chinese religion and philosophy, states that Tiantai Buddhism is "the earliest attempt at a thoroughgoing Sinitic reworking of the Indian Buddhist tradition." According to Paul Swanson, scholar of Buddhist studies, Tiantai Buddhism grew to become "one of the most influential Buddhist traditions in China and Japan."

Tiantai is sometimes also called "The Dharma Flower School" (天台法華宗), after its focus on the Lotus Sūtra, whose Chinese title translates to "Subtle Dharma Lotus Flower Sutra". During the Sui dynasty (581–618), the Tiantai school became one of the leading schools of Chinese Buddhism, with numerous large temples supported by emperors and wealthy patrons. The school's influence waned and was revived again in the Tang by figures like Zhanran, experiencing a second revival period during the Song dynasty. Chinese Tiantai remains a living tradition to this day, being particularly strong in Hong Kong and Zhejiang Province.

The Japanese Tendai school is also an influential tradition which branched off from Tiantai during the 9th century, and played a major role in the development of Japanese Buddhism. A Korean branch, the Cheontae school, was also established during the 12th century. Furthermore, Tiantai (and its offshoots) were very influential in the development of other forms of East Asian Buddhism, such as Chan and Pure Land.

== History ==
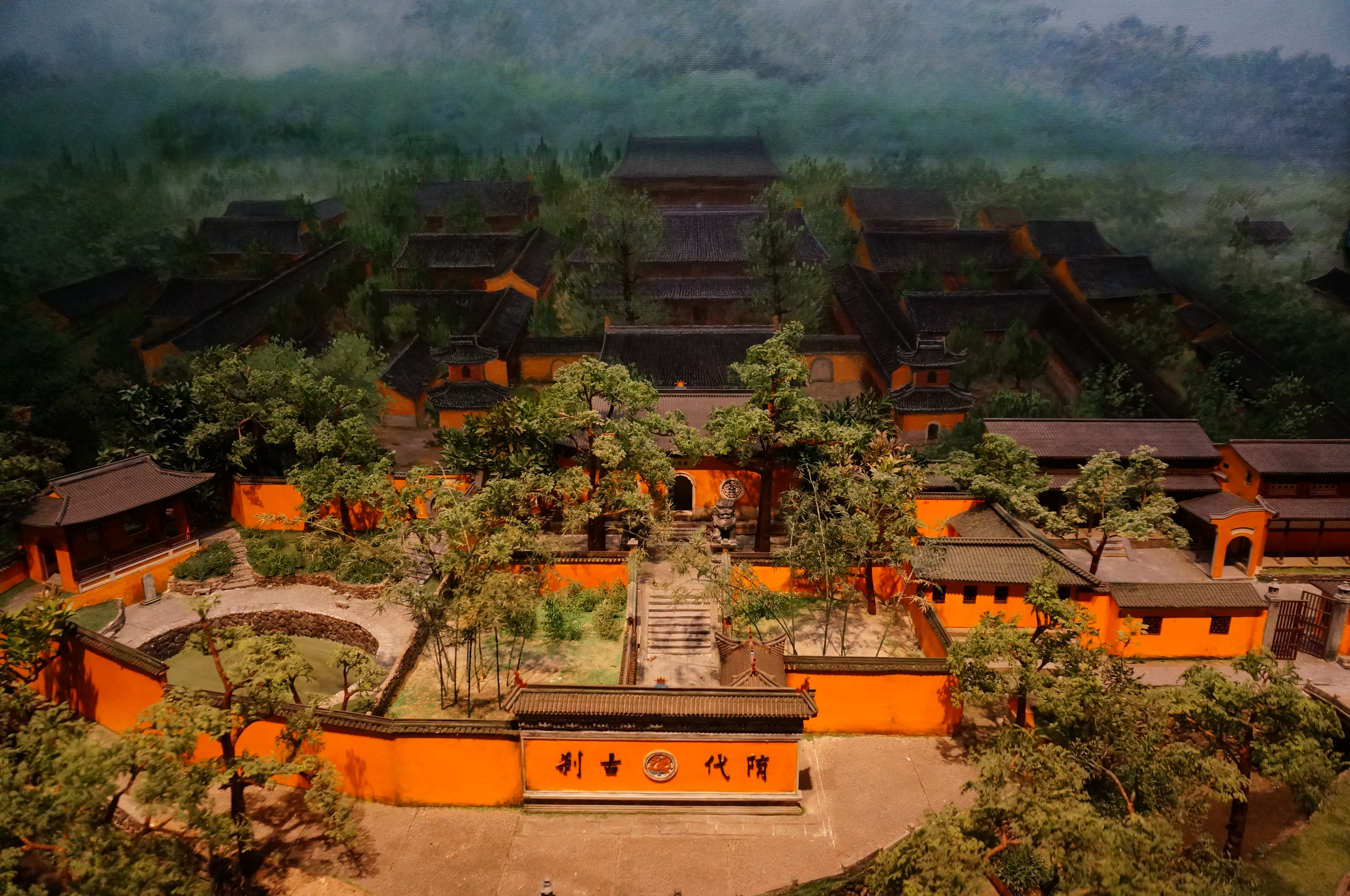
A model depicting Guoqing Temple, the home temple of Chinese Tiantai

The Indian Buddhist philosopher Nāgārjuna is traditionally taken to be the first patriarch of the Tiantai school. Madhyamaka works associated with Nāgārjuna like the Chung lun (Madhyamakaśāstra; Taishō 1564) and the Dà zhìdù lùn (T. no. 1509) are important sources for the Tiantai school.

The sixth century dhyāna master Huiwen (慧文) is traditionally considered to be the second patriarch of the Tiantai school. Through studying and meditating on the works of Nāgārjuna, Huiwen is considered by the Tiantai tradition to have awakened to the profound meaning of Nāgārjuna's teaching on the middle way.

Huiwen later transmitted his teachings to Chan master Nanyue Huisi (南嶽慧思, 515–577), who is traditionally figured as the third patriarch. During meditation, he is said to have realized the "Lotus Samādhi", indicating enlightenment and Buddhahood. He authored the Ta Ch'eng Chih Kuan (Mahāyāna-śamatha-vipaśyanā).

Huisi then transmitted his teachings to Zhiyi (智顗, 538–597), traditionally figured as the fourth patriarch of Tiantai, who is said to have practiced the Lotus Samādhi and to have become enlightened to the meaning of the "Lotus Sutra". The above lineage was proposed by Buddhists of later times and do not reflect the popularity of the monks at that time.

Zhiyi's Tiantai school grew into a broad tradition which was able to absorb new influences and develop new creative methods over time. The tradition emphasized both scriptural study and meditative practice, and taught an inclusive array of Buddhist practices, from samatha-vipasyana meditation, to repentance rites and Pure Land practice.

=== Zhiyi ===
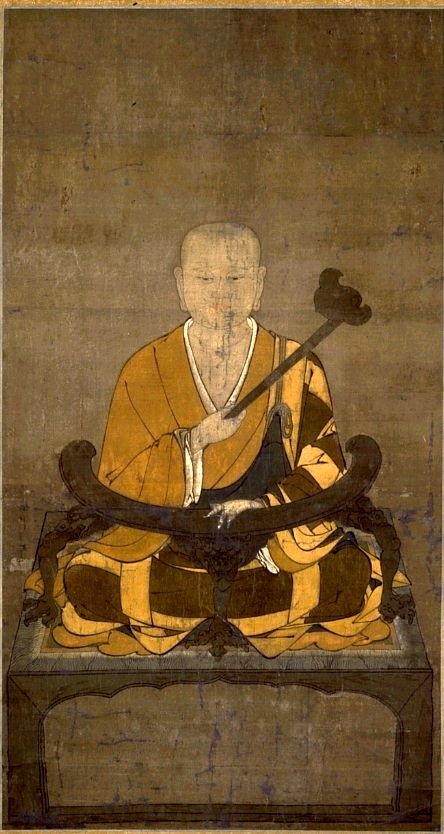
Painting of Śramaṇa Zhiyi

Scholars such as Paul L. Swanson consider Zhiyi (智顗, 538–597 CE) to have been the major founder of the Tiantai school as well as one of the greatest Chinese Buddhist philosophers. He was the first to systematize and popularize the complex synthesis of Tiantai doctrine as an original Chinese tradition. Zhiyi and his direct students authored numerous exegetical works, and treatises that explain the foundational cultivation methods of the Tiantai tradition (such as the Four Samadhis and the Lotus Repentance Rite).

Zhiyi analyzed and organized all Buddhist teachings into a comprehensive system of study and practice. He used the "Lotus Sutra" and its teaching on the One Vehicle and skillful means as the foundation for this system. Zhiyi's classification system culminates with the "Lotus Sutra" (and Nirvana Sutra), which he saw as the most complete teachings. His other innovations include a unique doctrine of a threefold truth (as opposed to the "two truths") along with a new system of Buddhist meditation and cultivation (found in his Mohe Zhiguan). Zhiyi's legacy also owes much to his disciple Guanding, who compiled the masters' "three main works" after Zhiyi's death.

Zhiyi spent much time on Tiantai Mountain (in Zhejiang province), which became a major center for the tradition. "Tiantai" in modern simplified Chinese means "celestial platform"; however, according to traditional Chinese sources such as Zhanran, the word tai refers to three stars in a constellation (called Santai, "Three Tiers") which is located just below the Big Dipper. Two other key centers of the early tradition were Yu-Ch'uan monastery in Hubei (founded by Zhiyi himself), which was the site where Zhiyi preached the Mohe Zhiguan and the Profound Meaning of the Lotus Sutra, and the Chang'an region, including Mount Wutai.

Zhiyi and the other Tiantai masters of the Sui dynasty era who succeeded him also wrote numerous works on other sutras such as the Nirvana, Vimalakirti, and the Pure Land sutras. Zhiyi's Tiantai doctrine provided a flexible system for the tradition which could be adapted to various Buddhist practices and teachings. Zhiyi's Tiantai school received much imperial support during the Sui dynasty, because of this, it was the largest Buddhist school at the beginning of the Tang and thus suffered because of its close relationship with the house of Sui.

Following Master Zhiyi, his disciple, Master Guanding played a crucial role in transmitting Tiantai doctrine by recording and organizing Master Zhiyi's works, ensuring they were heard in later times. Guanding also contributed to the protection and continuity of the school by communicating with the Sui government after Zhiyi's passing. He compiled Guoqing Bailu (国清百录), which collected early historical materials of Tiantai School.

=== Tang era and Zhanran ===
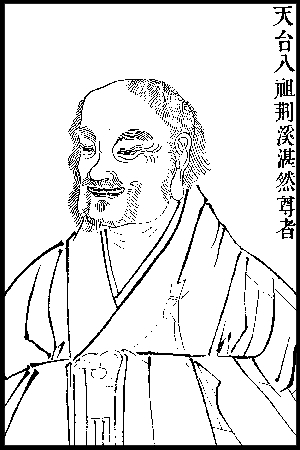
Illustration of Zhanran

After the generations of Zhiyi and his disciple Guanding, Tiantai was eclipsed for a time by newer schools such as the East Asian Yogācāra, and Huayan schools, until the 6th patriarch Jingxi Zhanran (711–782) revived the school and defended its doctrine against these rival schools.

During the Tang Dynasty (618–907), a key Tiantai figure was Jingxi Zhanran (711–782), a great teacher and exegete who wrote three important commentaries on Zhiyi's three major works and instructed many influential monks. His writings defended the Tiantai tradition's unity of study and practice against various rival factions. The Tang era debates between the Faxiang school and the Tiantai school concerning the notion of universal Buddhahood were particularly heated, with the Faxiang school asserting that different beings had different natures and therefore would reach different states of enlightenment, while the Tiantai school argued in favor of the Lotus Sutra teaching of Buddhahood for all beings.

Zhanran's view of Buddha nature was expanded in his Jingangpi (Diamond Scalpel), which is the key source for the doctrine of "the Buddha-nature of Insentient Beings." This influential doctrine held that since buddha-nature was all-pervasive, even insentient objects like mountains, sounds and smells have buddha-nature. Thus, according to Zhanran, "every blade of grass, tree, pebble, and particle of dust is perfectly endowed with buddha nature". Zhanran also emphasized the importance of scripture (especially the Mohe Zhiguan), seeing it as having the power to transmit the Tiantai lineage, in contrast to Chan influenced views which saw lineage as transmitted "mind to mind", outside the scriptures.

During the Tang dynasty, the revival of Tiantai School was also related to the involvement of several lay Buddhists scholars. Figures like Liang Su 梁肅 (753–793), a scholar specializing in Tiantai and Confucian doctrine and a disciple of Zhanran, contributed to the school's development and critiqued doctrines in other schools from a Tiantai perspective. Liangsu wrote numerous works drawing on Tiantai thought. Other important lay scholars included Li’ao (772–841) and Liu Zongyuan.

The Tang era was also a period of increasing syncretism within the Tiantai tradition. One example of this tendency is the synthesis of Tiantai teaching and Chinese esoteric Buddhism taught by Yi Xing (682–727) and his followers. Tiantai monks also became key figures in Chinese Pure Land Buddhism during the Tang. Some of these key Pure Land figures affiliated with Tiantai include Chengyuan (712–802) and Fazhao (fl. 766). Tiantai authors also wrote at least five different Pure Land works during the Tang which were attributed to Zhiyi, including the Guan-jing-shu (a commentary to the Contemplation Sutra) and the Jingtu shiyilun ("Discourse on Ten Doubts about Pure Land", T.1961).

Ziporyn writes that during the late Tang, Tiantai entered a time of crisis, "an age marked internally by the deterioration of distinctive Tiantai ideas and marked externally by the loss of crucial texts and monastic institutions, especially after the persecution of 845 (a period that saw the increased influence of Chan)."

During this latter Tang period, Huayan and Chan influences became increasingly prominent in some Tiantai lineages. Zhanran's disciple and seventh patriarch Daosui (796–805), and other figures such as Zhiyuan (768–844) and Daochang Ningfen are seen as exhibiting some of these influences. Daosui is important because he was the primary teacher of Saichō, the founder of the Japanese Tiantai tradition (known in Japanese as Tendai). Other Tiantai syncretists include Deshao (881–972) who was associated with the Fayan branch of Chan. His student Yongming Yanshou (954–974) attempted to unify Tiantai, Huayen and Yogacara teachings under a kind of idealism influenced by Zongmi, emphasizing what he called the "one pure formless mind".

Zhanran is a towering figure for the later Tiantai tradition. His commentaries were one of the few Tang sources that survive into the Song dynasty, where they would become the orthodox exegetical works for the Tiantai tradition as it attempted to rebuild after the chaos of the late Tang. However, Zhanran's influence during the Tang should not be overstated. Donner and Stevenson note that Tiantai was a diverse tradition from its very beginnings, with numerous traditions and lineages in different regions absorbing different influences (Chan, Huayan, the Pure Land of Shandao and the Tang esoterica of Amoghavajra). They write "such diversity suggests that we should speak in the plural when we speak of eighth-century Tiantai "tradition", with Zhanran's particular camp constituting but one among a number of semiautonomous lines."

=== Song dynasty revival ===
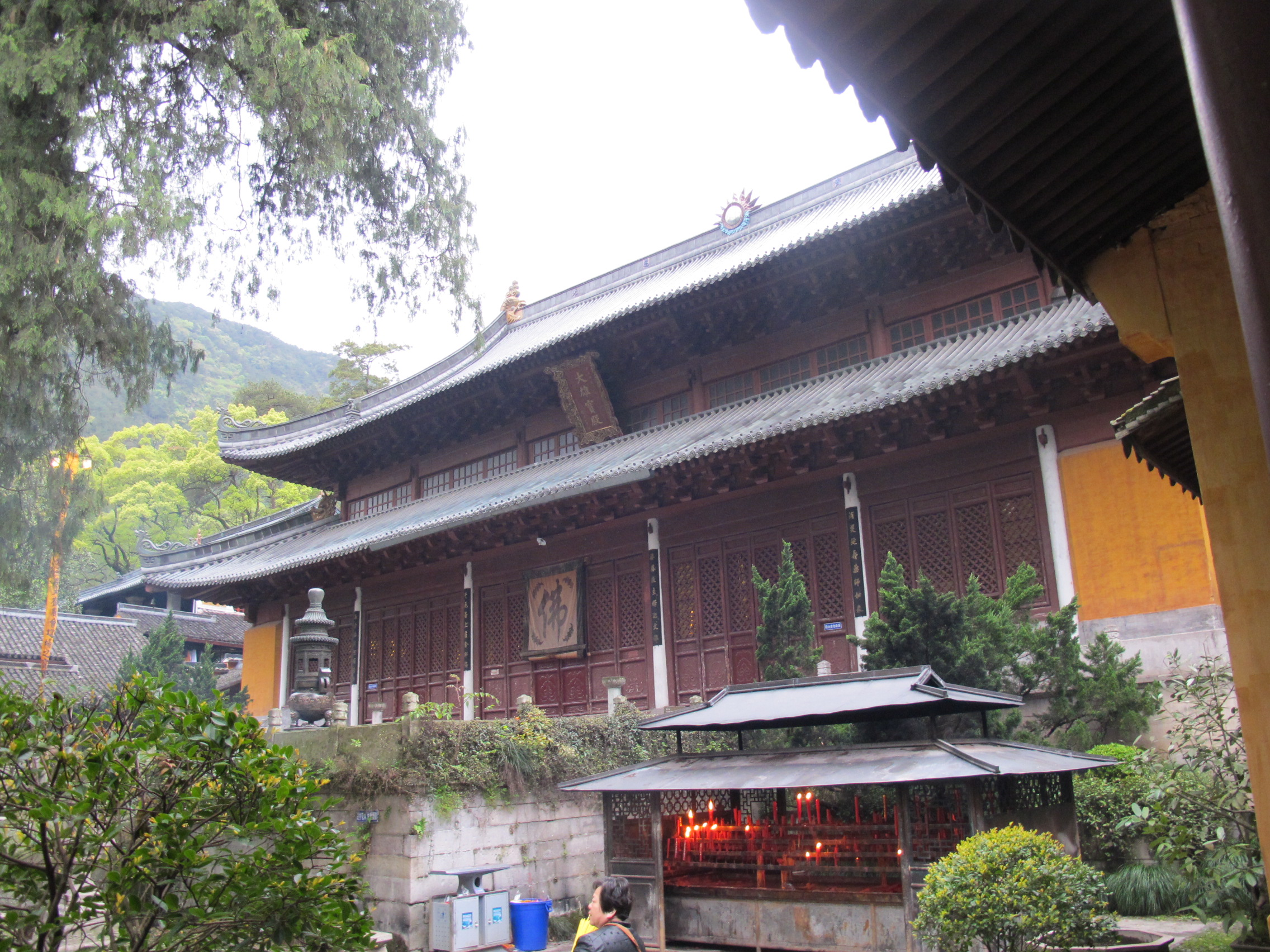
Guoqing Temple

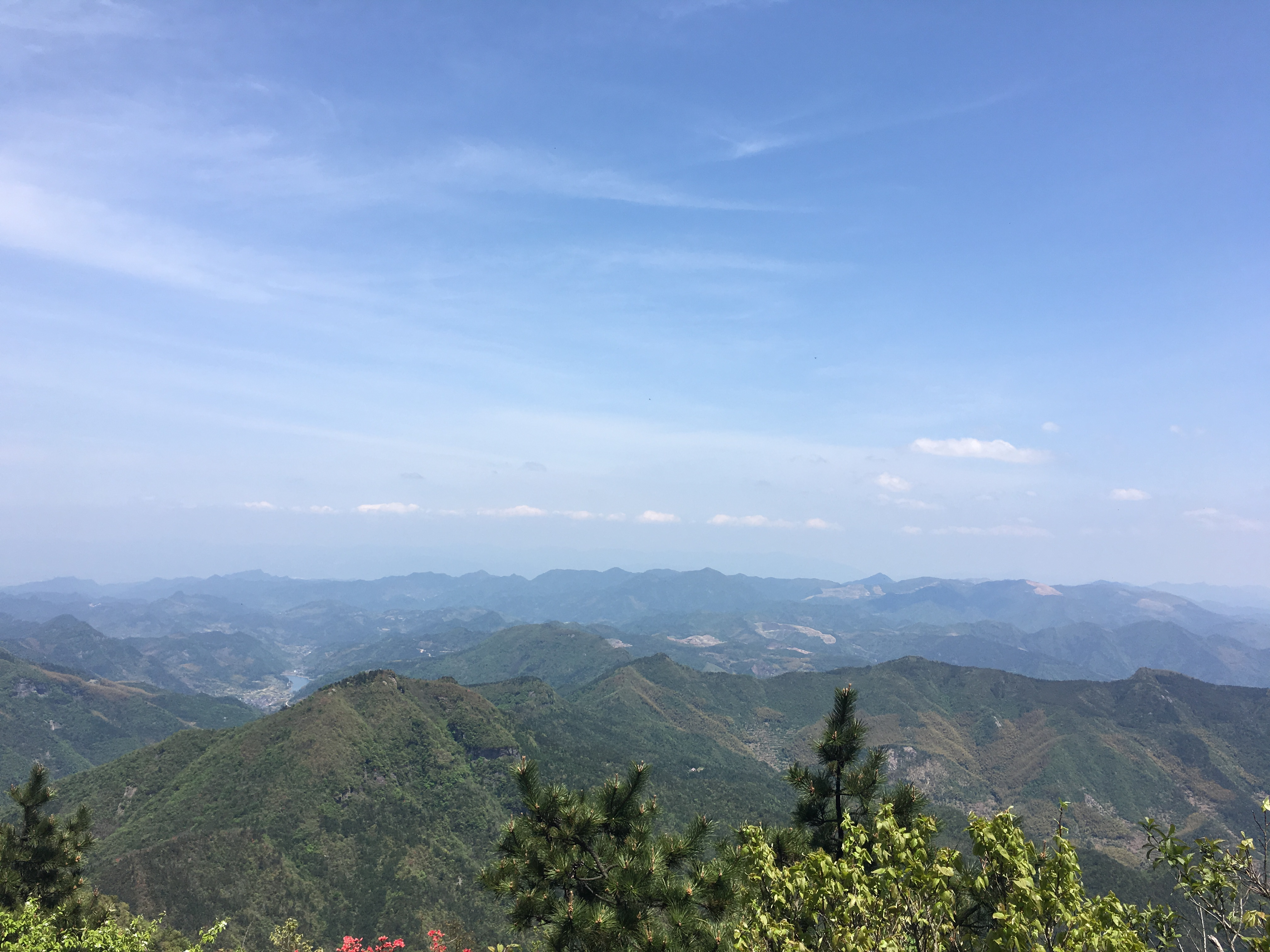
A panorama of Tiantai Mountain

The Song Dynasty (960-1279) saw efforts to revive the Tiantai school after the damages suffered during the Great Anti-Buddhist Persecution and the subsequent Huang Chao rebellion by importing many lost Tiantai works from abroad and reintegrating them into the weakened Chinese tradition.

A defining characteristic of the Song period was the emergence of various debates within Tiantai School among various factions. These debates arose due to factors like the influence of the Confucian revival movement, disagreements on Tiantai literature, variations in interpretative traditions, and geographical differences between areas like Tiantai mountain, Qiantang (Hangzhou), and Siming (Ningbo). The debates, sometimes tracing back to Master Yitong, involved issues such as the authenticity of the Commentary on the Contemplation Sutra attributed to Zhiyi and differing understandings of contemplation. Key figures of the Song included Master Yitong (a Korean disciple who transmitted dharma to Zhili and Zunshi), Master Zhiyin (who left Tiantai mountain and founded a new lineage), Master Wu’en (a patriarch of the tradition based in Qiantang), Master Zhili, and Master Zunshi.

The increasing tensions within the Tiantai tradition culminated in a famous debate known as the "home mountain" (shanjia) vs. "off mountain" (shanwai) debate. "Off mountain" supporters, as they were later polemically termed, supported the importation of Huayan-Chan doctrines (such as the "one pure mind") into Tiantai, claiming they were originally Tiantai doctrines which were fully compatible with Zhiyi's teaching. "Home mountain" supporters saw the original Tiantai view as different and superior to this new view influenced by Huayan and Chan, especially the works of Zongmi.

The Song era revival began in Zhejiang province, which became a major Tiantai center thanks to the Korean monk Yitong (Uitong, 佑忂, 927–988), who took up residence in Ningbo after having studied with master Xiji (919–987) at Mt. Tiantai. His two main disciples, Zhili and Zunshi, were responsible for the revival. The most eminent figure during this period was Patriarch Siming Zhili (960–1028), who wrote various commentaries on Zhiyi's works and defended the so-called "Home mountain" view. Zhili's major criticisms included attacking Chan's failure to understand the necessity of the use of words and scriptural study as part of practice as well as criticizing Zongmi's view of a pure mind as the buddha-nature, arguing instead that the "three truths" as taught by Zhiyi are the ultimate reality. For Zhili, mind or consciousness has no special status relative to other types of phenomena, such as physical matter, and thus, all dharmas are metaphysically equal.

Over time, Zhili's "Home mountain" view turned out to be the most influential, and his works became part of the orthodox Tiantai canon during the Song dynasty. Ciyun Zunshi (964–1032) was another important figure in this second Tiantai revival. His work focused on the promotion of rituals for lay Buddhists and worked on converting the populace away from using blood, meat and alcohol for funerary and ancestral rites. Ciyi also promoted the practice of adopting local Chinese deities and spirits into the Buddhist religion as "vassals" or "retainers" and strongly promoted repentance rituals. Another key Tiantai figure of the Song was Chegwan (?–971), a Korean monk who wrote an important introduction to Tiantai thought, "A Guide to the Tiantai Fourfold Teachings". Due to the efforts of these Song era Tiantai figures, the school became one of the dominant forms of Buddhism during the Song, alongside of Chan.

The Song dynasty also saw the emergence of significant Tiantai School histories. This historical tradition manifested in works like 释门正统 (Shimeng Zhengtong) and the major historical book, 佛祖统纪 (Fozu Tongji) by Master Zhipan. Zhipan's Fozu Tongji, completed in 1296, aimed to re-establish Tiantai School's status and lineage, especially in the context of the prevailing Chan School. Fozu Tongji also preserved valuable historical materials, including records of pure land dharma, other Buddhist schools, and secular events.

==== Song era Tiantai Pure Land ====
Zhili and Zunshi, along with Shengchang (959–1020), were also associated with the popularization of Pure Land practices, rituals and the foundation of lay Pure Land societies (called lotus societies, lianshe). Indeed, according to Getz, the Song era Tiantai revival was closely associated with the growth of Tiantai Lotus Societies focusing on Pure Land practice. Another important Tiantai Pure Land author was Zongxiao (1151–1214), author of the Lebang Wenlei, a Pure Land anthology. Many of these Tiantai figures also wrote Pure Land treatises and commentaries. The new Tiantai Pure Land societies influenced the creation of many similar societies by other later figures. They also became models for similar societies formed by monks of the Vinaya school, like Yuanzhao. The Tiantai monk Mao Ziyuan (1096?-1166) took the idea one step further by establishing what became known as the "White Lotus Society" which allowed both men and women to attend together and even to preach and be in charge of society repentance halls as married clergy.

Tiantai's relationship with the new Pure Land societies was marked by both influence and tension. The proliferation of independent Pure Land societies, particularly lay-led groups like the White Lotus, challenged the school's authority and prompted a reassessment of their relationship with Pure Land practice. Two significant factors contributed to this reassessment: the emergence of non-Tiantai Pure Land groups and internal debates about Pure Land doctrine and practice. This tension can be seen in Zongxiao's Lebang Wenlei, which outlines a Pure Land lineage outside of Tiantai Buddhism. This acknowledged the growing independence of Pure Land societies, which were increasingly seen as valid religious communities of their own. However, this monastic-led patriarchate was also a strategic effort to maintain monastic influence over lay-led movements that threatened the authority of the traditional establishment.

Doctrinal disagreements within Tiantai circles further complicated the relationship with Pure Land. Figures like Zhili sought to integrate Pure Land teachings with Tiantai meditation practices, emphasizing contemplation of the mind rather than invoking Amitabha or visualizing the Pure Land. While some, such as Tao-yin and Tao-ch'en, defended this approach, others like Yu-yen and Tse-ying rejected it, favoring traditional Pure Land practices centered on invocation and visualization. Zongxiao's Lebang Wenlei reflects the ongoing uncertainty and diversity of view regarding Pure Land's relationship to Tiantai. Rather than synthesizing these conflicting approaches, he presented diverse viewpoints side by side, acknowledging Pure Land's evolving distinct identity. Zhipan later reinforced this view in his "Comprehensive History of the Buddhas and Patriarchs", where he treated Pure Land as a separate tradition rather than fully integrating it into Tiantai orthodoxy.

=== Yuan, Ming and Qing ===
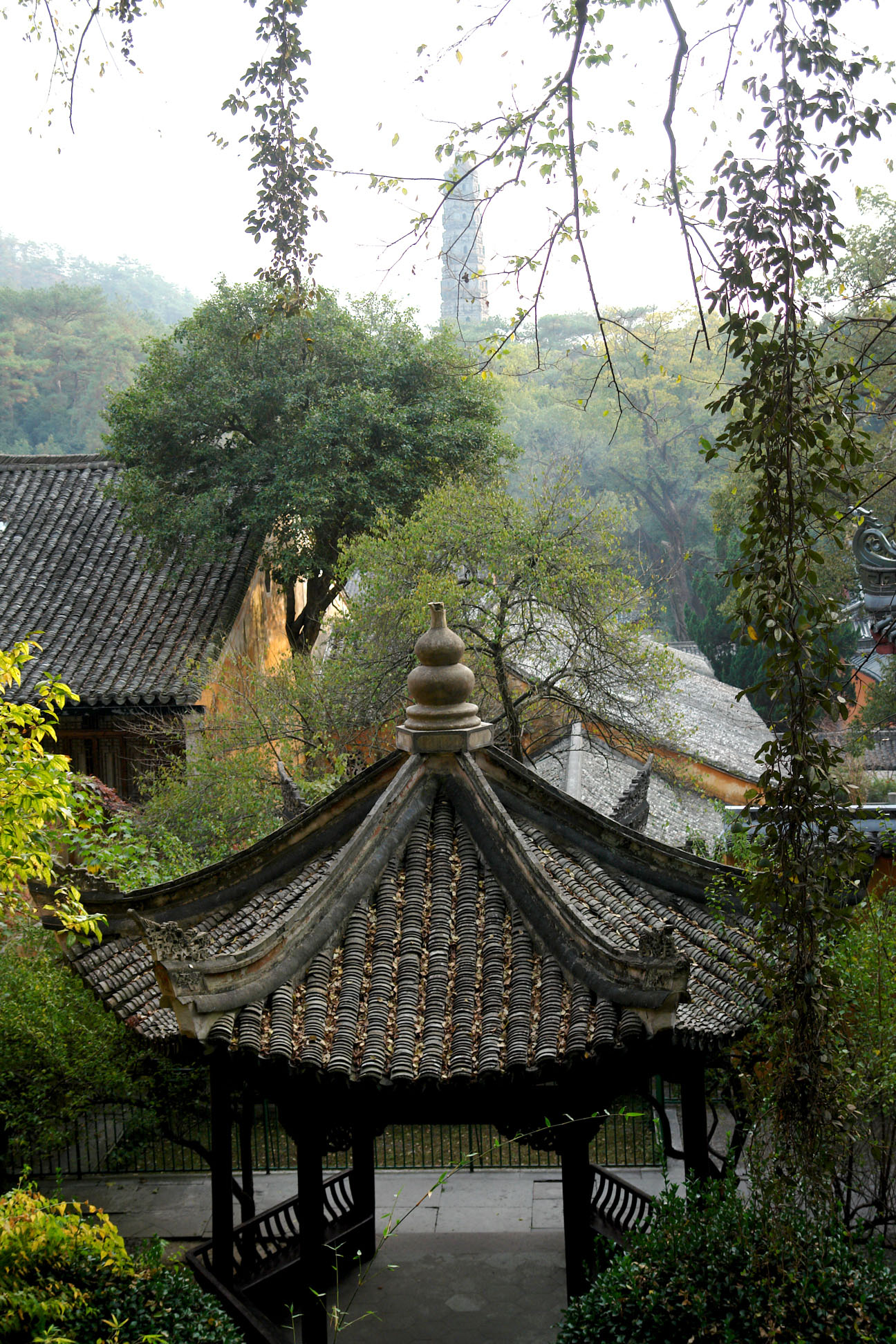
The Guoqing Temple on Tiantai Mountain, originally built in 598 during the Sui dynasty and renovated during the reign of the Qing Yongzheng Emperor (r. 1722–35).

The defeat of the Song dynasty was a serious blow to Tiantai which suffered another setback during the Yuan dynasty, which supported Tibetan Buddhism. Furthermore, during the Yuan, Chan Buddhism continued to grow in popularity, while attacking the legitimacy of other schools. This period saw the Tiantai figure Huxi Huaize (虎谿懷則, fl. 1310) write his polemical treatise "Record of Tiantai's Transmission of the Buddha's Mind-seal" as an effort to defend the Tiantai tradition against Chan critiques. During the Yuan, the Tiantai school was mainly concentrated in the Hangzhou area. Important traditional temples like Guoqing temple were taken over by the Chan school. The lineage during this time mainly developed from the Nanping tradition of the South, which gave rise to Master Huxi.

The Ming Dynasty (1368–1644) saw further religious revivals among the major Chinese Buddhist schools, including Tiantai, particularly under the reign of the Buddhist friendly Wanli Emperor. The key figures of the Ming Tiantai Buddhist revival were Baisong Zhenjue (百松真觉, 1538–1589) and Youxi Chuandeng (幽溪传灯, 1554–1628). Both were Chan monks who converted to Tiantai and attempted to revive the tradition. These figures wrote new works, lectured widely, and published gazetteers. They also commented on the Śūraṅgama Sūtra, the most popular sutra of the time, from a Tiantai perspective. They and their students revived ancestral Tiantai monasteries such as Gaoming and Ayuwang. Chuandeng wrote a work entitled "On Nature Including Good and Evil" which presents his ideas on doctrinal classification, the principle of nature-inclusion, and the practice of the Dharma-gate of inherent evil, attempting to harmonize these with Confucianism and the thought of the Śūraṃgama Sūtra.

Another important figure of the late Ming Dynasty was Ouyi Zhixu (1599–1655), one of the Four Eminent Monks of the Wanli Era. Ouyi wrote numerous works that draw heavily on Tiantai thought, and became known as the leading proponent of Tiantai and Pure Land Buddhism during this period.

Tianxi Shoudeng (1607–1675) was one of the most influential teachers and exegetes of Tiantai during the Qing Dynasty.

=== Modern era ===
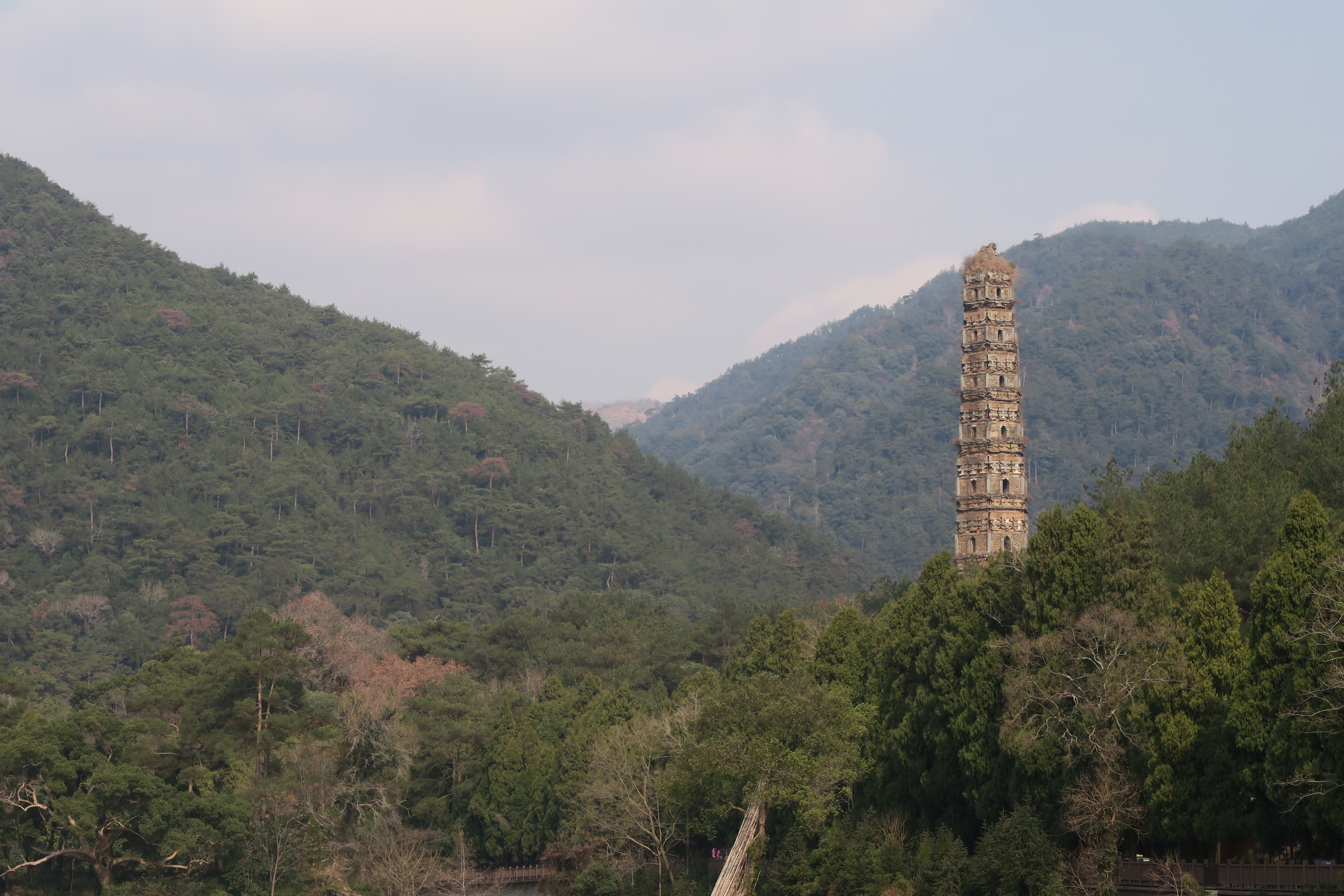
Guoqing Temple's old tower

Dixian was the most influential figure in modern Tiantai, who carried the Tiantai lineage (specifically the Lingfeng lineage) from the late Qing into the 20th century. Master Dixian is regarded as a reviver and the 43rd dharma ancestor of Chinese Tiantai. He was highly active in preaching and composing numerous works. Dixian played a significant role in establishing modern Chinese Buddhist education by founding institutions like the Contemplation Institute. Dixian's student, the monk Tanxu (1875 – 1963), is known for having rebuilt various Tiantai temples during the Republican era (such as Zhanshan temple in Qingdao) and for preserving the Tiantai lineage into the PRC era. The modern era also saw the rise important lay Buddhists active in studying Tiantai doctrine, such as Gong Zizhen. During the Chinese Civil War, various dharma heirs of Dixian moved to Hong Kong, including Tanxu and Baojing. They helped establish the Tiantai tradition in Hong Kong, where it remains a strong living tradition today, being preserved by their dharma heirs.

Baojing's dharma heir, Jueguang, helped establish the Guanzong Temple in Hong Kong and transmitted the lineage to numerous monks from Korea, Indonesia, Singapore, Taiwan and mainland China. Tanxuan's heir, Yongxing, founded Xifang Temple in Hong Kong, as well as various temples in Malaysia and the United States (as well as the Texas Buddhist association and its Jade Buddha Temple). Furthermore, other monks from this lineage have helped to reintroduce the Tiantai tradition from Hong Kong back to the rest of mainland China, aiding in the reconstruction of Chinese Buddhism after the reform and opening up period.

During the modern era, Tiantai thought was also influential on some modern Chinese philosophers, like Mou Zongsan (1909 –1995).

The ancient Guoqing Temple at mount Tiantai, which had suffered from neglect and destruction, was renovated at the behest of Zhou Enlai in 1973. Guoqing Temple is now a major center of Chinese Tiantai Buddhism and it also remains a place of pilgrimage for Japanese Tendai Buddhists.

== Texts ==
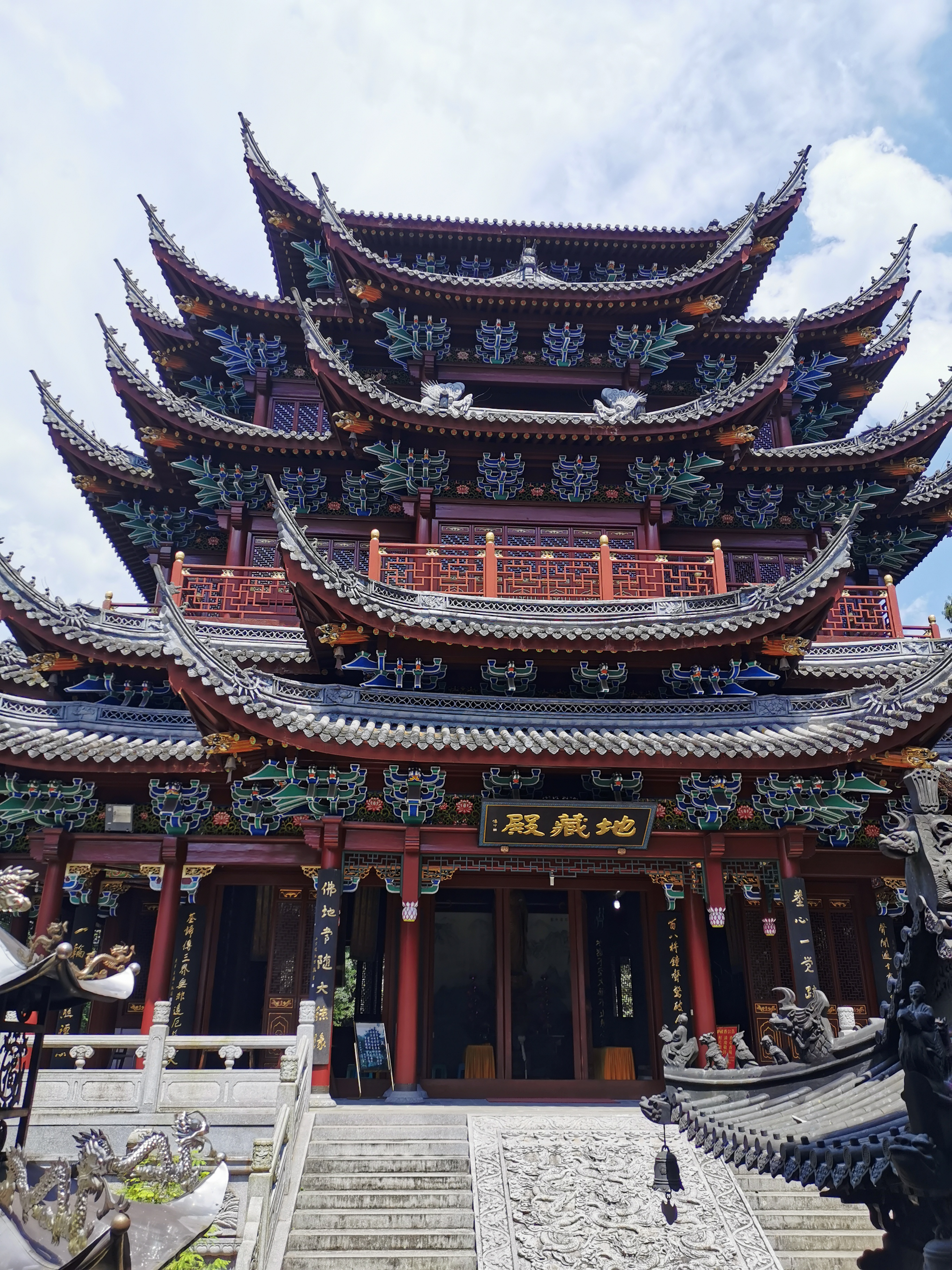
Hall of Ksitigarbha, Gaoming Temple, Tiantai County. It was restored in 1980 and is a National Key Buddhist Temple

The Tiantai school takes the Threefold Lotus Sūtra as the main scriptural authority (pratiśaraṇa). The supporting scriptures or retinue are considered to be the Da zhi du lun (the guide), the Mahāyāna Mahāparinirvāṇa Sūtra (the support), the Pañcaviṃśatisāhasrikā Prajñāpāramitā Sūtra (for methods of contemplation) and the Book of the Original Acts that Adorn the Bodhisattva (Pusa yingluo benye jing T. 24, No. 1485). Tiantai is often termed the "Four Sutras, One Treatise School" (四経一論) because of the strong influence of these texts on the tradition.

Apart from these, there other Mahayana sutras that are especially important in Tiantai. The Avataṃsaka Sūtra is also very highly regarded in Tiantai (and is widely quoted by Zhiyi) and it is seen as one of the subtlest sutras and to belong to the class of "complete" teachings. The Vimalakīrti Sūtra is also seen as an important sutra, and Zhiyi is known to have written two commentaries on this sutra. Other key sutras include the Golden Light Sutra (on which Zhiyi wrote commentaries), the three Pure Land sutras (central for Tiantai Pure Land), and the Brahma's Net Sutra (from which the tradition derives its bodhisattva precepts).

Indeed, the Tiantai school's study makes use of numerous sources. As noted by Donner and Stevenson: "when we examine the early [Tiantai] exegetical and textual record, we find that [Zhiyi] and his successors compiled treatises...for any number of sūtras other than the Lotus", noting that there was no real tendency to prefer any other single sutra.

=== Tiantai Treatises ===
In addition to its doctrinal basis in Indian Buddhist texts, the Tiantai school's doctrinal study relies on numerous Chinese treatises written by the ancestors of the school (especially important are those of Zhiyi, Zhanran and Zhili). The three major Tiantai treatises studied in the tradition are the following works of Zhiyi:

- The Mohe Zhiguan (摩訶止觀; "The Great Calming and Contemplation") (T1911), the main meditation guide of the tradition. There are also three other meditation works by Zhiyi as well, with the Smaller Calming and Contemplation often used for beginners.
  - Read with Zhanran's commentary: Zhiguan fuxing zhuan hongjue (止觀輔行傳弘決), (T1912)
- The Fahua Xuanyi (法華玄義; "The Profound Meaning of The Lotus Sutra"), (T1716)
  - Read with Zhanran's commentary: Fahua Xuanyi Shiqian (法華玄義釋籤), (T1717)
- The Fahua Wenju (法華文句; "The Words and Phrases of The Lotus Sutra"), (T1718)
  - Read with Zhanran's commentary: Fahua Wenju Ji (法華文句記), (T1719)

There is also another set known as the Five Lesser Tiantai Treatises:

- The Guanyin Pusa Pumenpin Xuanyi (觀音菩薩普門品玄義; "The Profound Meaning of the Universal Gate of Avalokitesvara Bodhisattva Chapter"), (T1726)
  - Read with the Zhili's commentary: Guanyin Xuanyi Ji (觀音玄義記), (T1727)
- The Guanyin Pusa Pumenpin Yishu (觀音菩薩普門品義疏; "The Commentary on the Universal Gate of Avalokitesvara Bodhisattva Chapter"), (T1728)
  - Read with Zhili's commentary: Guanyin Yishu Ji (觀音義疏記), (T1729)
- The Jinguangming Jing Xuanyi (金光明經玄義; "The Profound Meaning of the Golden Light Sutra"), (T1784)
  - Read with Zhili's Commentary: Jinguangming Jing Xuanyi Shiyi Ji (金光明經玄義拾遺記)
- The Jinguangming Jing Wenju (金光明經文句; "The Words and Phrases of the Golden Light Sutra"), (T1785).
  - Read with Zhili's commentary: Jinguangming Jing Wenju Ji (金光明經 文句記)
- The Guan Wuliangshoufo Jingshu (観無量寿佛經疏; "The Commentary on the Buddha of Immeasurable Life Sutra"), (T1750)
  - Read with Zhili's commentary: Miaozongchao (妙宗鈔), (T1751)

Two other important treatises are Zhanran's Adamantine Scalpel (a work on Buddha-nature) and the Contemplation of Mind Treatise (Guanxinlun) by Zhiyi.

== Philosophy ==
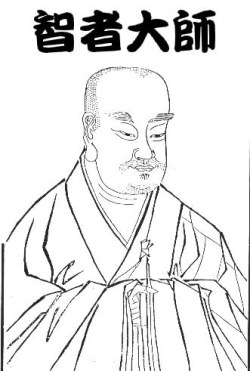
Zhiyi, the foundational philosopher of the Tiantai school

David Chappell lists the most important Tiantai teachings as being The Threefold Truth and the corresponding Threefold Contemplation, The Fourfold Teachings, The Subtle Dharma, and The Non-conceivable Discernment (or the "Inconceivable Mind"). Brook Ziporyn writes that Tiantai's "rigorous theoretical edifice" uses "modes of argumentation and praxis that are derived squarely from Indian Buddhism" but applies these "in the service of ideals and metaphysical conclusions that are rooted deeply in the indigenous philosophical traditions."

=== The Threefold Truth ===
==== "Emptiness, existence, and the middle" ====
The Tiantai school's main philosophical principle is The Threefold Truth (空假中; kōng, jiā, zhōng; "emptiness, existence, and the middle"). According to Paul Swanson, this is the "central insight" around which the Tiantai system revolves. This view was developed by Zhiyi's reading of Nāgārjuna's Madhyamaka philosophy, especially its doctrine of two truths. The Threefold Truth comprises the following:

1. All phenomena are empty (śūnya, 空; kōng) of any independent self-nature or essence (svabhava), this corresponds to the Mahayana concept of the "ultimate" or real (paramārtha) truth and emptiness (shunyata) which Zhiyi defines as "the sign of the true nature of reality".
2. Phenomena exist (假; jiǎ) in a provisional manner, they can be said to conventionally arise through causes and conditions (i.e. dependent origination). This corresponds to the conventional or mundane truth (saṁvṛti) of the classic Mahayana two truths, which Zhiyi glosses as "the twelvefold conditioned co-arising of ignorance" and as "illusory existence".
3. The middle truth (中; zhōng): phenomena are both empty of existence and exist provisionally. According to Dan Lusthaus: "it is 'middle' because neither the provisional nor the empty truth about the table fully captures its reality. It is both provisional and empty, and simultaneously neither provisional nor empty. As Zhiyi put it, 'wondrous being is identical to true emptiness'." Swanson writes that this is "a simultaneous affirmation of both emptiness and conventional existence as aspects of a single integrated reality". The middle truth for Zhiyi transcends all dualities and avoid all extremes, such as existence and non-existence, being and emptiness, mundane truth and real truth, or defilement and purity.

While the threefold truth can be explained conceptually in this way, for Zhiyi, the highest and most subtle meaning of the threefold truth is ultimately indescribably and beyond words. It is also fully integrated and inclusive of all the Buddhadharma and of all mundane and ultimate truths as well. According to Zhiyi, "the supreme truth of the middle path" is "the reality of non-duality", as well as "the enlightened perception of all Buddhas and bodhisattvas." Zhiyi also states that it is also called "the truth of one reality", as well as "emptiness" (空; kōng), "Buddha-nature" (佛性; fóxìng), Thusness (tathātā, 如如; ruru), tathāgatagarbha (如来藏; rúláizàng), and the Dharmadhatu (法界; fajie).

==== The Threefold Contemplation ====
The Threefold Truth may be contemplated independently as the "three contemplations", an important theme in Zhiyi's Mo ho chi kuan. The threefold contemplation, also described as the threefold cessation and insight, consists of what Zhiyi calls a "graded contemplation":{{sfn

1. Cessation as insight into the true essence of reality - This consists in contemplating the emptiness of all phenomena and their lack of own being (svabhava).
2. Cessation as insight into expedient conditions - This consists in contemplating the conventional existence of all things, i.e. dependent arising or as Zhiyi describes it "the non-emptiness of emptiness", which means that emptiness is not nothingness.
3. Cessation as an end to both discriminatory extremes - A contemplation which is the simultaneous unity of both 1 and 2 and which is totally beyond conceptualization and thought.

There are different levels of subtlety of this threefold contemplation, the deepest of which is when all three aspects are contemplated as a simultaneously non-dual unity which according to Zhiyi is when all three aspects are "present in one thought" (一心) which is "beyond conceptual understanding". According to Chappell:

The first contemplation involves moving from the world of provisionality to seeing its emptiness, which is a different process from the second contemplation in which we move beyond emptiness and back into an acceptance of the role of provisional existence. Only in the third contemplation do we find the balance involving the previous two insights based on the Middle Path of the One Mind.

=== Mutual inclusion ===
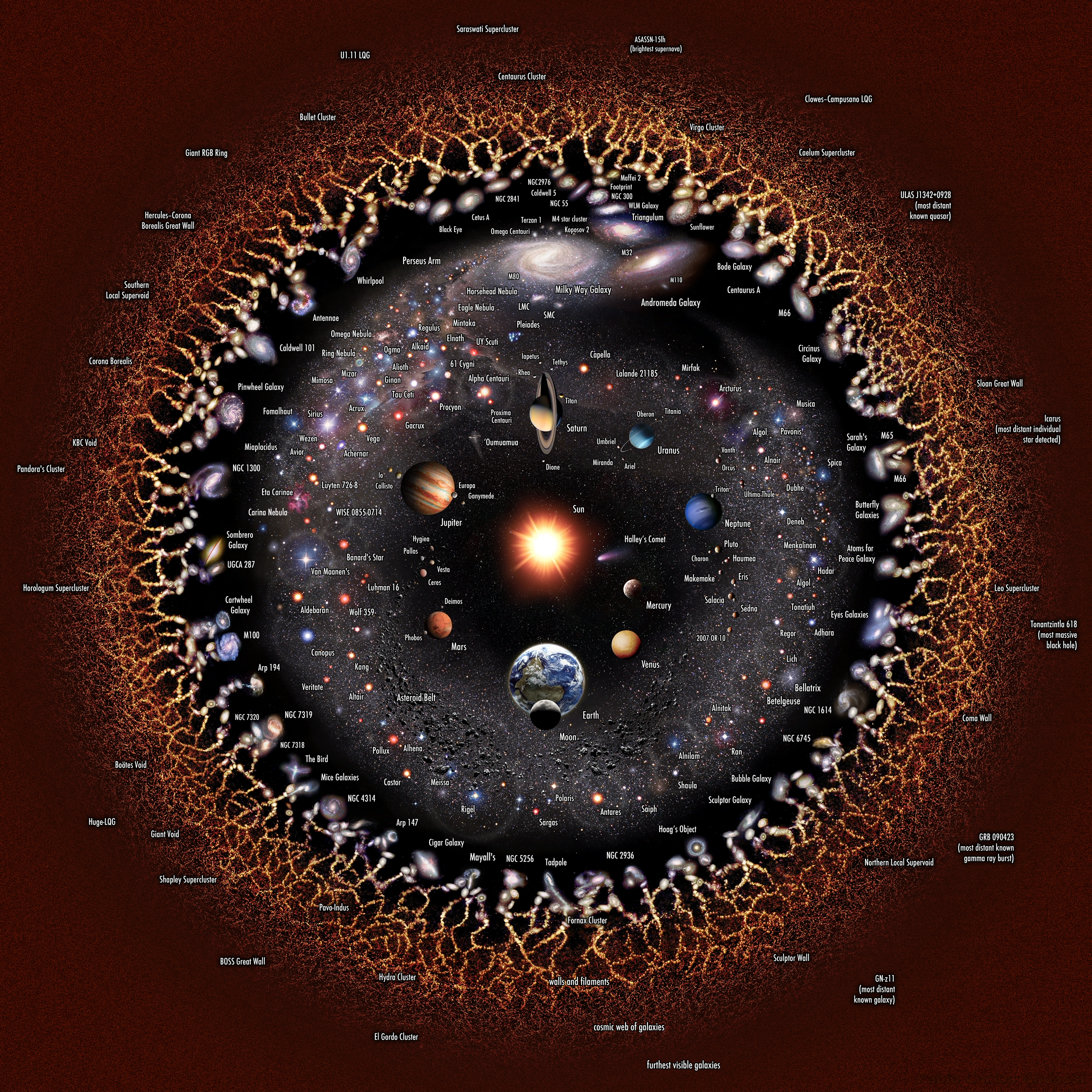
Logarithmic illustration of the known universe

==== Interpenetration ====
Since the three truths are one, and this truth is a single unity, Tiantai thinkers see the whole of reality is as being a single interpenetrating whole, one integrated existence. This is often described through terms such as "mutual inclusion" (互具; hu ju), "nature inclusion" (性具; xing ju) or "inherent inclusion" (本具; ben ju). The basic idea here is that any individual phenomenon (dharma) includes or entails every other phenomenon. This also entails that each phenomenon includes the entirety of the ultimate truth (and vice versa, that the ultimate truth includes all particular phenomena in the universe). In other words, each part or particular thing ro part contains the entirety of existence, all of reality. This holism is described in different ways, such as "the interinclusiveness of the ten realms" or "the interpenetrating unity of all aspects of reality". According to Swanson, in this view, "everything contains everything else, and the whole contains all things".

Zhiyi illustrates the idea of a single interpenetrating reality with the simile of the drunk man from the Mahāparinirvāṇa Sūtra, who perceives the sun as spinning around due to his condition, but in reality there is just one sun and this is confirmed by sober people. However, Zhiyi also points out that even this idea of "one truth" is just a concept, and as such it is ultimately inadequate, since "each and every truth is inexpressible" and "the one truth actually no truth".

According to Brook Ziporyn, the Tiantai school's interfused holism is derived from an extremely important passage from the Chinese translation of the Lotus Sutra which states:

Only a Buddha together with a Buddha knows the ultimate reality of all things: how they appear, what their natures are, what they're made of, what they are capable of, what they are doing, what their causes are, what their conditions are, what their effects are, what their consequences are, and the way in which all these factors from beginning to end are equally ultimate and are ultimately one and the same.

Ziporyn argues that this passage points at the idea "that each particular aspect of the world as we see it and feel it is ultimately real, that each one is in fact the Absolute itself, the Buddha-nature, the final fact about the universe" and that "each thing, each appearance, each action" is "the ultimate reality "of " all other things".

==== Three Thousand Realms in One Thought Moment ====
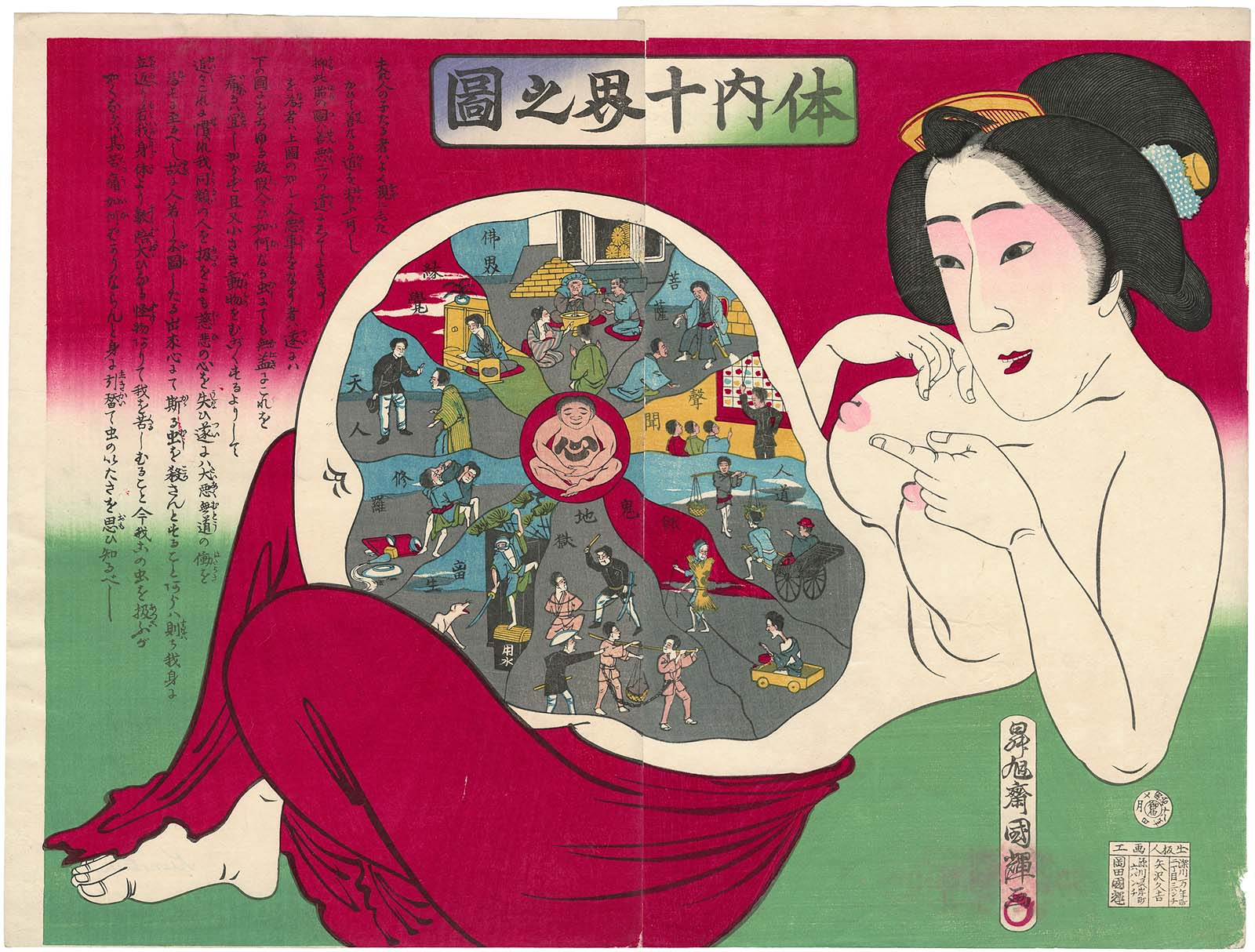
Japanese depiction of the ten realms as contained in the mind of a fetus

One of the ways this holistic doctrine is explained is the idea of "Three Thousand Realms in a Single Thought Moment" or "The Presence of All Three Thousand Aspects of Existence as Each Moment of Experience" (一念三千). According to this teaching, the various realms of existence of Buddhist cosmology (including all the ten realms) are all interconnected and interpenetrating. Each of these realms can manifest within an individual's mind, meaning that states of existence are not only external places of rebirth but also modes of experience and perception. Zhiyi explained that each thought contains the ten dharma realms, and since each realm includes all others, this results in one hundred dharma realms. Each of these realms further contains thirty worlds, culminating in a total of three thousand worlds within each thought moment.

This concept emphasizes the interpenetrating nature of reality, where each thought encompasses all phenomena. Jacqueline Stone notes that this reflects a mutually inclusive relationship between every ordinary thought and the entirety of existence. The number three thousand arises from multiplying key Buddhist categories: the ten realms of beings, their mutual inclusion, the ten suchnesses, and the three realms. This doctrine presents a holsitic view of reality where distinctions such as Buddha and ordinary being, subject and object, or sentient and non-sentient are seen as unified and interdependent within each moment of thought.

Despite this unified view, Zhiyi used various frameworks to describe reality, such as the two truths, the threefold truth, and the ten realms. He also employed the Three Subtle Dharmas (sentient beings, Buddha, and mind) and the Ten Suchnesses to explain this interconnected nature. Zhiyi taught that by observing one's mind and thoughts, one can perceive the entirety of reality and achieve Buddhahood. Drawing from the Avatamsaka Sutra, he emphasized that contemplating the mind allows one to realize the Buddha's dharma fully. He referred to this integrated reality as "the inconceivable mind" (不思議心), which embodies the three thousand dharmas and the threefold truth.

=== The Subtle Dharma: One Reality, One Vehicle, many Skillful Means ===
The Tiantai school's soteriology is based on the doctrine of the "One Vehicle" (ekayāna, Chinese: 一乘; pinyin: Yīchéng) found in the Lotus Sutra. Tiantai sees all the various Buddhist teachings, scriptures and practices as being part of a single holistic vehicle (yana) leading to Buddhahood. The discrepancies and seeming contradictions in all the different teachings of the sutras are only due to the fact that these various teachings are all "expedient means" (upāya) that are taught according to the different needs and capacities of sentient beings. According to Zhiyi, even though there numerous sutras with many varied teachings, the intent of the Buddha is to lead all sentient beings to Buddhahood. Similarly, just as there are different practices, there are different ways to describe the same unified reality (i.e. emptiness and the threefold truth). Thus, Zhiyi states in the Fa hua hsuan i "various terms name one ultimate reality. Only one ultimate reality is given many names." This ultimate reality is "one yet many, many yet one". It is many because there are diverse phenomena that arise and perish dependent on causes and conditions and it is one because all of this is equally empty.

Indeed, Zhiyi outlines four types of oneness: the oneness of the teachings (all teachings of the Buddha are non-contradictory and have one intent), the oneness of the practices (all lead to Buddhahood), the oneness of persons (all will attain Buddhahood), and the oneness of reality. According to Zhiyi, any text which is consistent with these concept teaches "the Subtle Dharma" (miao-fa).

This doctrine provided a unifying and inclusive framework which could be used to understand all Buddhist teachings. According to Jacqueline Stone, Zhiyi's view of the One Vehicle of the Lotus Sutra is that conventionally, it is "subtle" and "wonderful" in comparison with lesser teachings which are coarse. However this is only true in a relative sense. Ultimately, the Lotus Sutra's Subtle Dharma is "not established in comparison to anything else, for there is nothing outside it to which it might be compared". From this absolute perspective, the Lotus Sutra's One Vehicle is "open and integrated" according to Zhiyi, and includes all other Buddhist teachings and skillful means. From the ultimate point of view, all distinctions of "true" and "provisional" are dissolved since all teachings are expressions of the One Vehicle. According to Stone, "this is an egalitarian, inclusive reading, in which all teachings in effect become "true". But from the relative standpoint, a clear distinction is preserved between the "true" and the "provisional"; this is a hierarchical, potentially even exclusive reading, which emphasizes the superiority of the Lotus Sutra over other teachings."

=== Buddhahood and Buddha-nature ===
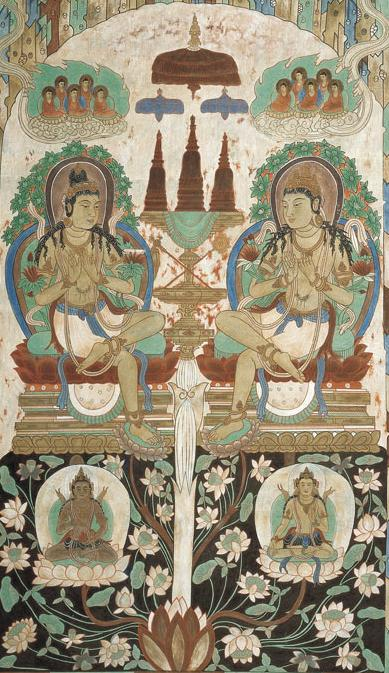
A scene from the Lotus sutra, the Buddhas Prabhutaratna and Shakyamuni seated in the jeweled stupa, painting from Yulin caves, seventh to fourteenth centuries.

Zhiyi's teaching on Buddhahood, as presented in The Profound Meaning of the Lotus Sutra, emphasizes the integration of Buddhahood with all aspects of reality. He describes three ways of understanding the causes for Buddhahood: (1) each of the ten dharma realms contains the other nine, meaning all beings possess the potential for Buddhahood; (2) the nine non-Buddha realms are inherently linked to Buddhahood; and (3) all realms are empty of inherent existence and aligned with the threefold truth. As for the result, Buddhahood is pervasive throughout the universe, was attained by the Buddha in the distant past (as described in the Lotus Sutra), and manifests in countless forms to aid sentient beings. Consequently, Zhiyi asserts that Buddhahood is not separate from ordinary existence but is fully integrated with it, with the mind, Buddhas, and sentient beings being fundamentally interconnected.

Zhiyi's interpretation of Buddha-nature is structured around three interconnected aspects: Buddha-nature as the conditional cause of Buddhahood, the complete cause, and the direct cause. The conditional cause refers to the inherent potential in sentient beings to practice the Dharma and cultivate conditions that lead to enlightenment. The complete cause emphasizes the intrinsic presence of wisdom in all beings, which, once uncovered, reveals the true nature of reality. Lastly, the direct cause signifies that all beings already participate in the ultimate reality of thusness. Zhiyi's concept of Buddha-nature is closely linked to his theory of the threefold truth, which unites emptiness, conventional reality, and the middle way. While some scholars, such as Ng Yu-Kwan, emphasize a "Middle Way–Buddha Nature" concept in Zhiyi's thought which sees buddha-nature as a positive, dynamic and active force which is present in and non-dual with the world. Scholar scholars like Paul Swanson argue that this active view of buddha-nature is less central in Zhiyi's original texts and instead see Zhiyi's view as consistent with Madhyamaka's emphasis on emptiness.

The later Tiantai thinker Zhanran is best known for advancing the doctrine of the Buddha-nature of insentient beings, which became central to Tiantai thought. In works such as The Adamantine Scalpel, Zhanran argues that all phenomena, including seemingly lifeless objects like plants, stones, and sounds, possess Buddha-nature. He grounded this view in the Tiantai doctrine of universal inclusion, which teaches that all things, sentient or insentient, are interconnected and interpenetrating. For Zhanran, Buddha-nature is synonymous with Suchness, the ultimate reality that is both unchanging and responsive to conditions. Because Suchness pervades all things without exception, even insentient objects participate in this universal Buddha-nature. This view reflects the influence of Huayan Buddhism, particularly Fazang's theory of "Suchness according with conditions," which asserts that the absolute reality manifests itself in the diversity of phenomena.

Both Zhiyi and Zhanran share a vision of Buddha-nature as pervasive and intrinsic to all reality, an active potential within sentient beings, rooted in their capacity for wisdom and practice. Zhanran expanded on this concept to assert that Buddha-nature is equally present in insentient things, thereby emphasizing the non-duality between beings and their environment. This theory would become the subject of much debate in the history of Tiantai Buddhism.

=== Inherent evil ===
One doctrine which came to be considered a unique hallmark of Tiantai thought is Inherent or natural evil (性惡), which is the idea that "our inherent nature includes good and evil" (性具善惡; xing ju shan e). While Buddha-nature is often understood as a universal true nature which is wholly good and pure, the Tiantai school distinguishes itself by proclaiming that ultimate reality, the Buddha-nature, contains not only the good but also the bad. Tiantai regards Buddha-nature as the mind-nature (心性; xin xing) of sentient beings. By emphasizing the non-duality and mutual inclusiveness of all reality, Tiantai rejects the idea of the true nature (the ultimate reality) as being a primal purity prior to all things or separate from them (a doctrine promoted by the Dilun school and some Chan masters). As noted by Ziporyn, the teaching that "Buddhahood does not cut off evil" means that "our joy also includes sorrow, our sorrow also includes joy; our evil includes good, our good includes evil; our delusion includes enlightenment, our enlightenment includes delusion".

The idea that the true nature includes both good and evil is mentioned in the Method of Cessation and Contemplation in Mahāyāna (大乘止觀法門; Dasheng zhiguan famen), a 6th-century work which may have influenced Zhiyi, who also uses various quotes from the Vimalakirti to defend this view. Zhiyi critiqued the idea of a pure nature as the source of all reality found in the Dilun school and the idea that reality arises solely from defiled nature (of the Shelun school). Instead, he argued that the ultimate reality includes all the good and evil of all ten realms. This idea was further defended and developed by later Tiantai figures like Jingxi Zhanran who taught it as a unique element of Tiantai's doctrine of mutual inclusion. Later figures like Siming Zhili and Youxi Chuandeng further articulated and defended the doctrine of inherent evil.

The Tiantai theories of the interfusion of all realms and nature-inclusion serve as the foundation for the idea that Buddha-nature includes good and evil. Since all things are included within the true nature and all realms (even hell) interpenetrate within any one thought, the buddha-nature cannot be separate from evil (and vice versa). This idea is characterized by inherent inclusion (本具; ben ju) and the mutual inclusion of good and evil, meaning that good includes evil and evil includes good. Due to the interfusion of all phenomena, Zhiyi affirmed that “one thought of ignorance is the mind of dharma-nature” (念無明法性心; yi nian wu ming fa xing xin) and “afflictions are exactly bodhi (awakening).” Zhiyi writes in the Profound Meaning of the Lotus Sutra that "without evil there is no good. turning evil over is precisely the fulfillment of good.” Thus, the concepts of good and evil are relative, since each depends on the other. The complete teaching is the highest kind of good, and from this supreme understanding, samsara and nirvana are fully non-dual. Furthermore, Zhiyi also argues that the distinction between Buddhas and evil sentient beings is not in their nature (which is the same), but in their level of cultivation. Thus, the inherent nature shared by both also includes inherent evil, while only beings have cultivated evil. Even though Buddhas do not give rise to cultivated evil, they can appear in evil forms as skillful means. All of this does not mean that Zhiyi does not promote the cultivation of good or the abandoning of evil however. Rather it means that even the most evil of beings can also become Buddhas by contemplating their own evil (the three poisons) and developing it into good.

=== Classification of teachings ===
The Tiantai-tradition provides a panjiao, a systematization and classification of Buddha's teachings, into the "Five Periods and Eight Teachings" (五時八教) to explain how the different and sometimes contradictory teachings from the various scriptures came into being and relate to each other. According to tradition, the Buddha offered various levels of complexity of his teachings, based on the capacities of his audiences. From the Tiantai point of view, the One Vehicle teaching of the Lotus is the highest and most perfect teaching, which includes all Buddhist views and practices.

The Tiantai classification system is based on Zhiyi's writings, but was significantly expanded by later figures into its mature form. According to Peter Gregory, Japanese scholars like Sekiguchi Shindai have shown that the mature system was developed by Zhanran and that Zhiyi never presents a single system of "Five Periods and Eight Teachings" (though he does use the "five flavors" and four teachings).

==== Five Periods ====
The Five Periods (五時) are five phases in the life of Shakyamuni Buddha in which, according to Tiantai exegetes, he delivered different teachings, aimed at different audiences with a different level of understanding. The Five Periods are:

1. The Avatamsaka Period (華嚴時): For twenty-one days after his awakening, the buddha delivered the Avatamsaka Sutra, one of the highest sutras, but this was not widely understood.
2. The Agama or Deer Park Period (鹿苑時): For twelve years, the Buddha preached the Āgamas, which includes the preparatory teachings of the Four Noble Truths and dependent origination.
3. The Vaipulya Period (方等時): For eight years, the Buddha delivered the Mahāyāna or Vaipūlya (expanded) teachings, such as the Vimalakirti Sutra, the Śrīmālādevī Sūtra, the Suvarnaprabhasa Sutra, Laṅkāvatāra and other Mahāyāna sutras.
4. The Prajñaparamita Period (般若時): For twenty-two years, the Buddha taught the Mahāyāna Prajñaparamita-sutras.
5. The Lotus and Nirvana Period (法華涅槃時): In the last eight years, the Buddha preached the doctrine of the One Buddha Vehicle, and delivered the Lotus Sutra and the Nirvana Sutra just before his death.

==== Eight Teachings ====
The Eight Teachings are a classification of different types of Buddhist teaching. They consist of the Fourfold Teaching, and the Fourfold Method.

The Fourfold Teachings (化法四教) are "increasingly subtle explications of one and the same content, the basic Buddhist teaching". They are called teachings because they are "that which discloses the principle and converts beings" according to Zhiyi. They four teachings are:

1. Tripitaka Teaching (三藏教): the Sutra, Vinaya and Abhidharma, in which the basic teachings are explained. According to David Chappell, the main elements of this teaching is "the thirty seven conditions for enlightenment, austerity, precepts, intellectual analysis of emptiness, the Six Perfections, and meditation" and the main view is the "arising-and-perishing among the ten realms of existence".
2. Shared Teaching (通教): the teaching of emptiness, which is shared by Mahayana and Theravāda. This corresponds to the first of the three contemplations and the practices of the ten stages of the bodhisattva that are shared with the Theravāda.
3. Distinctive Teaching (別教): the teachings of the Bodhisattva path. This corresponds to the second of the three contemplations. It "involves practices summarized by Chih-i into Fifty two Stages of a Bodhisattva" according to Chappell.
4. Complete (Round) Teaching (圓教) - the complete and perfect teaching, which is beyond words and concepts. It can be found in the Lotus Sutra and the Avatamsaka Sutra. This corresponds to the third of the three contemplations. According to Chappell, "the Complete Teaching moves beyond stages to see the identity and interpenetration of all the various practices, ideas, and values based on Suchness, Buddha-nature, and the Inconceivable Perceptual Process. Nevertheless, it also has its own set of unique practices such as the Five Repentances."

The Fourfold Method (化儀四教) classifies four different ways that the Buddha uses to guide sentient beings of different capacities. The four are:

1. Gradual Teaching (漸教) – Teaches the truth in stages; suited for practitioners who need step-by-step guidance through provisional teachings to reach ultimate truth.
2. Sudden Teaching (頓教) – Reveals the ultimate truth directly and immediately; for those with sharp faculties who can grasp nonduality without gradual preparation.
3. Secret Teaching (祕密教) – A teaching which communicates in a secret manner in which the Buddha's intent remains hidden to most and is understood only by certain members of the assembly.
4. Variable Teaching (不定教) – A method with no fixed teaching; the interpretation is not fixed but depends on the hearer's capacities. Each individual derives a unique benefit from their own individual interpretations.

==== The Four Siddhāntas ====
Another way that Tiantai thinkers like Zhiyi classify the Buddhist teachings is through the Four Siddhāntas (principles, tenets), which are four principles that the Buddha used to teach the Dharma derived from the Da zhidu lun. According to David W. Chappell, the Four Siddhāntas are:

(1) First of all, the Buddha used ordinary or mundane modes of expression, (2) then he individualized his teaching and adapted it to the capacities of his listeners, (3) he further altered it in order to respond to and diagnose the spiritual defects of his hearers, and (4) finally all his teaching was based on the perfect and highest wisdom. The first three are conditioned and finite, whereas the last is inconceivable and ineffable.

According to Chappell, the main idea of the Tiantai understanding of the Buddha's method of teaching is the "receptivity-and-response appropriate to a person's capacities", or "communication based on receptivity-and response". According to Chappell this means that "not only the form of the teaching, but also the quest for enlightenment (bodhicitta) arises during an interaction involving a response to the capacities and needs of a person."

=== The Six Degrees of Identity ===
Tiantai's explanation of the path of the bodhisattva was set forth in Zhiyi's doctrines of the Six Degrees of Identity. The Six Degrees of Identity provide an important path schema for the Tiantai school. These six degrees of realization are as follows:

1. Identity in Principle (理即; Liji): All beings and things are inherently identical with Buddhahood, even without awareness of this fact or practice. This is like owning treasure without knowing it.
2. Identity in Name (名字即; Mingziji): Through hearing or understanding Buddhist teachings, one becomes aware of this inherent Buddha-nature, like being told about the hidden treasure.
3. Identity in Practice (観行即; Guanxingji): Actively engaging in contemplation and practice to manifest this Buddha-nature, like beginning to clear the ground and dig for the treasure.
4. Identity in Resemblance (相似即; Xiangsiji): Progress in practice results in wisdom resembling true enlightenment, like nearing the treasure through persistent digging.
5. Partial Identity (分真即; Fenzhenji): A partial realization of Buddha-nature, beginning at the first bodhisattva stage and extending to near-complete enlightenment. This is like seeing the treasure within its chest.
6. Ultimate Identity (究竟即; Jiujingji): Full enlightenment, with Buddha-nature completely realized and ignorance fully eradicated. This is like uncovering and using the treasure.

== Practice ==
Tiantai Buddhism emphasizes the integration of meditative practice, doctrinal study, and ritual observance. Central to Tiantai practice is the system of the Four Samadhis, along with numerous ritual practices. These practices aim to cultivate concentration (samadhi) and insight (vipasyana), leading to the realization of the Three Truths. Tiantai meditation techniques are closely tied to the teachings of the Lotus Sutra, which is regarded as the supreme expression of the Buddha's Dharma. Other common Tiantai practices include rites for conferring bodhisattva precepts and the use of esoteric practices like dhāraṇīs and mantras.

=== Meditation (zhiguan) ===
According to Charles Luk, in China it has been traditionally held that the meditation methods of the Tiantai are the most systematic and comprehensive of all. Tiantai meditation is primarily described as "zhi-guan", the union of calming or cessation (止; zhǐ, from śamatha) and contemplation or insight (觀; guān, from vipaśyanā). Zhiguan (止観), also known as calming and insight (śamatha-vipaśyanā), is a comprehensive system of Buddhist meditation developed by the Chinese Tiantai master Zhiyi. For Zhiyi, zhiguan is not limited to meditation alone but encompasses all Buddhist practices, integrating ethical conduct, mental stillness, and the cultivation of wisdom.

The practice of zhiguan can be understood as comprising two interconnected yet distinct facets. Zhi may be described as a state of "cessation" or "stopping". In this stage, the chaotic and disordered thoughts typical of everyday experience are calmed, allowing the mind to rest in tranquility. This mental stillness is both a prerequisite for and a result of the second phase: Guan, which may be translated as "contemplation" or "clear seeing". This contemplative process focuses on observing the mind without discrimination and seeing all phenomena as empty. Embracing the universal truth of emptiness, the practitioner refrains from imposing hierarchies of value on what is observed. This includes rejecting any notion that oneself or any aspect of oneself is exempt from the impartial nature of transience.

Zhiyi identified two modes of zhiguan practice: seated meditation and the practice of maintaining a calm and insightful mind in daily activities. He favored this comprehensive understanding of zhiguan over the term "chan" (zen), which he considered more restrictive. In practical terms, Tiantai teaches three approaches to cultivating zhiguan: gradual and successive practice, variable practice tailored to individual needs, and perfect and sudden practice, which directly apprehends reality without reliance on progressive stages. Each method reflects different levels of spiritual capacity and conditions.

Zhiyi's magnum opus, the Móhē Zhǐguān details Zhiyi's extensive meditation curriculum, organized into four key frameworks: the "twenty-five skillful means", the "four samādhis," the "ten objects of contemplation", and the "ten modes of contemplation". The twenty-five skillful means include preparatory practices like precept-keeping, sensory restraint, and associating with spiritual friends. The four samādhis describe different meditative approaches such as constant sitting, constant walking, alternating sitting and walking, and mindfulness during all activities. The ten objects of contemplation focus on various aspects of existence, while the ten modes provide structured ways to contemplate them, such as "contemplating mind as the inconceivable" (the central mode), arousing compassion, dismantling false views, and practicing detachment.

Zhiyi saw the four samadhis as the main pillar of Tiantai meditation practice. These are:

- Constant Sitting Samādhi (常坐三昧): This practice involves 90 days of uninterrupted seated meditation, fostering deep concentration and inner calm. It draws from the Mañjusri Prajñaparamita Sutra.
- Constant Walking Samādhi (常行三昧): Practiced for 90 days, this method involves mindful walking, often in a designated space or around a Buddha statue. It is based on the Pratyutpanna Samādhi Sutra and emphasizes Amitābha recitation, influencing Pure Land practices.
- Half-Walking, Half-Sitting Samādhi (半行半坐三昧): This combines seated and walking meditation in alternating periods. Linked to the Lotus Sutra and the Great Correct and Equal Dhāranī Sutra, it is often practiced during repentance rituals like the Hokke Senbo.
- Neither Walking nor Sitting Samādhi (非行非坐三昧): This flexible practice transcends fixed postures, encouraging meditative awareness in all daily activities. It emphasizes mindfulness as an ongoing state rather than a structured practice.

Zhiyi's highest form of zhiguan, the "perfect and sudden" method, emphasizes immediate insight into the true nature of reality. This approach directly contemplates reality as inherently unified, with no distinction between samsara and nirvana, suffering and liberation. In this state, all phenomena are seen as aspects of the Middle Way, where quiescence (cessation) and illumination (contemplation) are simultaneous and inseparable. Through this method, practitioners realize that ultimate reality is fully present in every aspect of experience, requiring no staged progression or sequential cultivation.

The Tiantai school also teaches various other forms of meditation under the rubric of Zhiyi's zhi-guan teaching, such as mindfulness of breathing (ānāpānasmṛti). In his Six Dharma Gates to the Sublime, Zhiyi outlines a meditation method based on this classic Buddhist practice.

=== Repentance rites ===
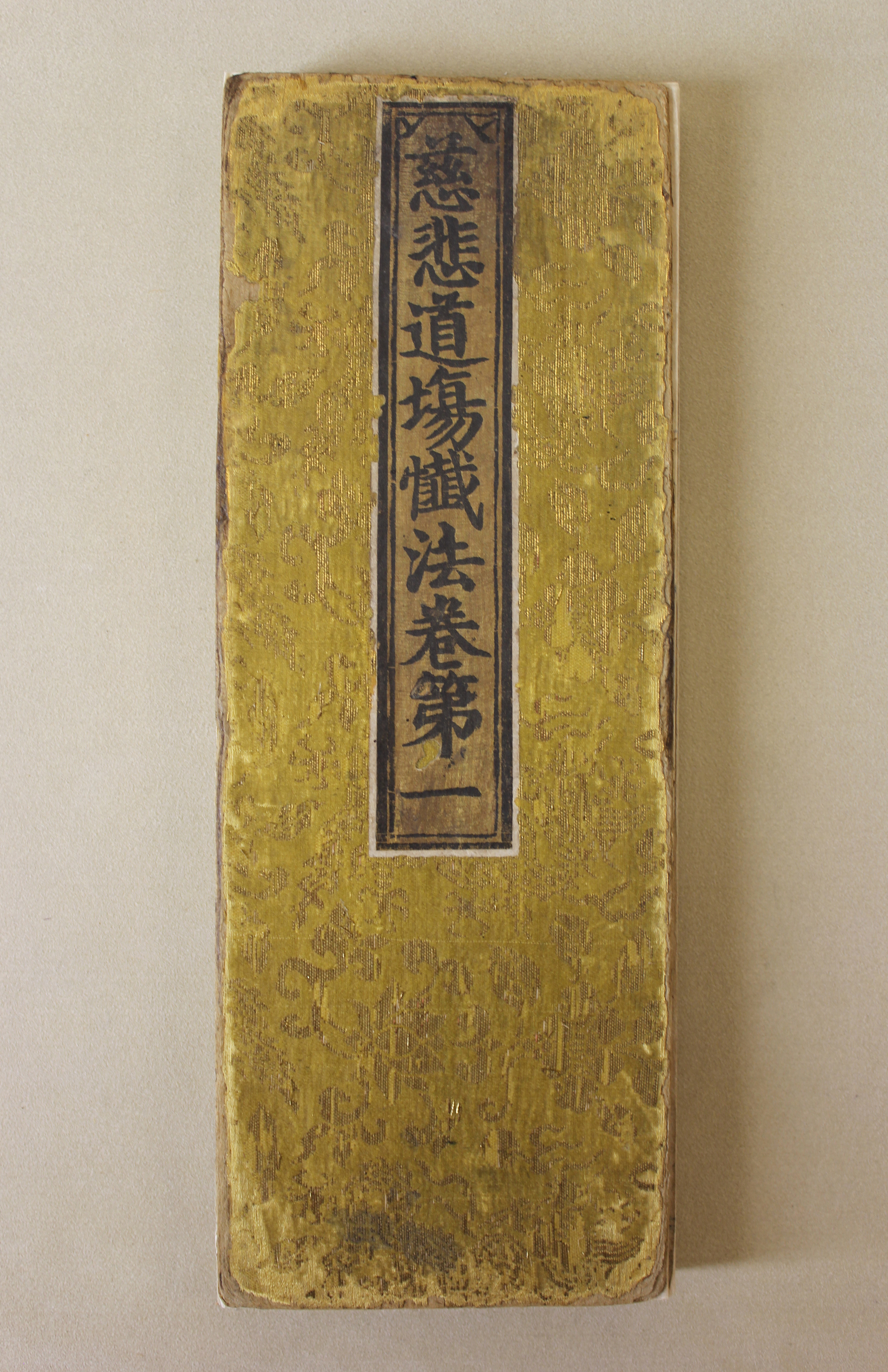
A manuscript of the Repentance Ritual of Great Compassion (Cibei daochang chanfa), composed by Siming Zhili, which is based around the Great Compassion Dhāraṇī

Since the time of Zhiyi (538–597), the Tiantai tradition developed a sophisticated set of repentance rituals connected to the Lotus Sutra. These repentance practices (which also drew on other texts like the Golden Light Sutra) were grounded in the five-fold method of repentance, which includes acts of repentance, prayer, sympathetic joy, merit transference, and bodhisattva vows. Despite their name, Tiantai repentance rites are not just focused on purifying past misdeeds. Instead, they are multifaceted rituals with numerous aspects, including the cultivation of refuge, devotional faith, bodhicitta, virtue and meditative insight.

Tiantai repentance rituals like the Lotus Repentance, the Invocation of Guanyin Repentance and the Great Compassion Repentance, include both "repentance through activity"—involving prostrations, offerings, chanting, recitation of mantras—and "repentance through principle", in which practitioners contemplate the emptiness of all phenomena. Zhiyi's Lotus Samadhi Rite of Repentance is the most prominent Tiantai ritual. It blends the two main aspects of repentance into an extensive ritual, encouraging practitioners to purify their minds while deepening their understanding of the Dharma. According to Daniel Stevenson, "since the end of the sixth century, the Lotus repentance, as set forth in Zhiyi's manual, has constituted one of the mainstays of practice in the Tiantai school, and its ritual forms continue to govern practice in the modern world."

The Lotus Samadhi Rite of Repentance drew inspiration from two key texts: the Meditation on Samantabhadra Sutra and the "Chapter on Peaceful Practices" in the Lotus Sutra. The former emphasizes repenting misdeeds connected to the six senses, while the latter highlights non-discriminatory awareness and formless repentance—a practice where the mind realizes its inherent emptiness, transcending distinctions of virtue and vice. Zhiyi maintained that both "practices of form" and "formless practice" were essential in the earlier stages of cultivation, yet both are ultimately abandoned upon achieving profound realization. In this view, repentance was not merely an act of confession but a process of understanding the interdependent nature of reality.

Stevenson outlines the practice of the Lotus Repentance as follows:

1. purification of the altar site
2. purification of the practitioner
3. incense offering
4. veneration of deities
5. confession of past misdeeds, with transfer of merits and prayers
6. chanting the Lotus Sutra while circumambulating the altar
7. taking the three refuges
8. retiring to a separate solitary location in which one practices seated meditation or individual recitation of the Lotus Sutra

Repentance rituals in the Tiantai tradition evolved to meet the needs of Chinese society, blending Buddhist doctrine with popular beliefs about cosmic retribution and ancestral influence. The practice became central to Chinese Buddhist culture, especially in the form of public repentance ceremonies held during festivals such as the Ghost Festival. These ceremonies often aimed to alleviate the suffering of deceased relatives and were seen as acts of collective merit. Prominent Tiantai figures like Zunshi expanded upon Zhiyi's work by systematizing repentance ceremonies, contributing to the development of distinct rituals such as the Lotus Repentance and the Golden Light Repentance.

=== Pure Land practice ===
Pure Land Buddhist practices (especially nianfo, the recitation of the Amitābha's name), has always been a major part of Tiantai Buddhism. Zhiyi himself is said to have practiced nianfo on his deathbed and had a vision of Guanyin and Amitabha. Many Tiantai figures were key in spreading Pure Land practice in China during the Tang and Song dynasties. Some of the key Pure Land figures of the Tang were affiliated with Tiantai, including Chengyuan (712–802) and Fazhao (fl. 766). Tiantai school authors also wrote various Pure Land texts and commentaries and at least five different Pure Land works were written in the Tang and apocryphally attributed to Zhiyi, including the Guan-jing-shu (a commentary to the Contemplation Sutra) and the Jingtu shiyilun. During the Song dynasty (960–1279), Tiantai monks such as Shengchang (省常; Shěngcháng, 959–1020), Ciyun Zunshi (慈雲尊式; Cíyún Zūnshì, 964–1032), and Siming Zhili founded Pure Land societies that included elites, monks and common laypeople. These Tiantai monks also wrote Pure Land treatises and commentaries. Zunshi is known for his development of Tiantai Pure Land rituals, including the Rite for Repentance and Vows for Rebirth in the Pure Land (Wang- sheng ching-t'u ch'an-yuan i), which is a repentance rite for birth in the Pure Land.

Another important Tiantai Pure Land author is Zongxiao (1151–1214), author of the Lebang Wenlei, a major Pure Land anthology. The Lebang Wenlei contains many Tiantai Pure Land writings, including dharanis, treatises, stories, hymns and poems. This work shows the diversity of Tiantai Pure Land practice during the Song. These various texts also indicate that, apart from nianfo recitation, Tiantai Pure Land practice also included visualization meditations based on the Contemplation Sutra, memorization of Pure Land verses (gathas), as well as various rituals.

Perhaps the most influential later Tiantai Pure Land author is Patriarch Ouyi Zhixu (1599–1655), author of the Essential Explanations of the Amitābha-sūtra (Emituojing yaojie). Ouyi Zhixu's approach to Pure Land practice emphasizes the dynamic interplay between the "other-power" of Amitabha and the "self-power" of the practitioner's efforts. Central to his teaching is the concept of "sympathetic resonance" (ganying), which is based on the view that all phenomena are manifestations of the One Mind (Dharmakaya). For Ouyi, the most effective way to achieve awakening is through nianfo (Buddha-recollection), a practice which he sees as harmonizing Zen and the scriptural traditions. He presents a threefold model of nianfo practice: (1) contemplating the external Buddha, (2) meditating on one's intrinsic Buddha-nature, and (3) merging the two in simultaneous contemplation. Ouyi asserts that the Buddha's name itself carries the power of Amitabha's enlightened nature, allowing even those with scattered minds to plant seeds of awakening simply by hearing or reciting it. This reflects his conviction that Amitabha's compassionate power transcends individual effort, ensuring all beings can form an affinity with the Pure Land path.

=== Textual practices ===
In addition to repentance, textual practices centered around Lotus Sutra devotion is also an important part of Tiantai practice. Tiantai emphasizes the veneration of the Lotus Sutra itself as a sacred text, often treating it as the embodiment of the Buddha. Practices such as copying the sutra (or sponsoring such an act), reciting it (as a solitary practice or in a group), teaching it or listening to its teachings, and performing related devotional acts are believed to generate merit and wisdom. Through these practices, Tiantai Buddhism aims to balance meditative insight with ritual devotion, offering a comprehensive path toward enlightenment.

The Lotus Sutra itself emphasizes the merit of reading, reciting, copying, and teaching the text. In accordance with this, Zhiyi established recitation rites that incorporated ritual elements such as offerings, group chanting, prostration, and ritual purification. The devotional aspect of these rites highlights the belief that the Lotus Sutra embodies the Buddha's presence and wisdom. Related practices included visualizations of buddhas and bodhisattvas or even extreme acts of self-sacrifice to demonstrate devotion (such as burning off fingers, or copying the sutra in one's own blood).

=== Esotericism ===
Since the time of Zhiyi, Tiantai Buddhism relied on esoteric Buddhist practices, especially the practice of reciting dhāraṇīs. Specifically, Zhiyi wrote the Fangdeng sanmei xingfa (方等三 昧行法; "Method for Practicing the Vaipulya Samādhi")( T. 1940) and the Qing Guanyin chan fa (請觀音懺法; "Method for Repentance Through Invoking Avalokiteśvara"), which rely on the Mahāvaipulya-dhāraṇī sūtra and the Qing Guanshiyin pusa xiaofudu hai tuoluoni zhou jing (請觀世音菩薩消伏毒害陀羅尼咒經; "Spell Scripture of the Dhāraṇī for Invoking Avalokiteśvara Bodhisattva in Order to Get Rid of Poisonous Vexations") respectively. Traditionally, Tiantai Buddhists also recited many other classic dhāraṇī and mantras which are used across Chinese Buddhism, including the Ten Small Mantras, the Great Compassion Dhāraṇī and the Shurangama Mantra.

During the Song dynasty, Chinese Tiantai also adopted various elements from Chinese Esoteric Buddhism, a development which led to more complex rituals like Tiantai forms of the Shuilu Fahui ceremony and also Yujia Yankou rites.

== Key Ancestors ==
The following ancestors or patriarchs (祖; zǔ) are some of the most important masters in Chinese Tiantai:

- Nāgārjuna (3rd century CE)
- Huiwen (d.u.)
- Nanyue Huisi (515–577)
- Zhiyi (538–597), also called Zhizhe
- Guanding 561–632)
- Zhiwei (?–680)
- Huiwei (634–713)
- Xuanlang (673–754)
- Zhanran (711–782), also called Miaole
- Daosui (806–820)
- Guangxiu (771–843)
- Wuwai (813–885)
- Yuanxiu (?–885)
- Qingsong (d.u.)
- Yiji (919–987)
- Yitong (927–988)
- Siming Zhili (960–1028), also known as Siming Fazhi
- Miaofeng Zhenjue (1537–1589)
- Youxi Chuandeng (1554–1628)
- Ouyi Zhixu (1599–1655)
- Dixian (1858–1932)

== Influence ==
David Chappell writes that although the Tiantai school, "has the reputation of being...the most comprehensive and diversified school of Chinese Buddhism, it is almost unknown in the West" despite having a "religious framework that seemed suited to adapt to other cultures, to evolve new practices, and to universalize Buddhism". He attributes this failure of expansion to the school having "narrowed its practice to a small number of rituals" and because it has "neglected the intellectual breadth and subtlety of its founder".

== See also ==
- Chinese Buddhism
- Chinese folk religion
- Guoqing Temple
- Huayan
- Tiantai in Japan
- Tiantai in Korea
- Zhou Jichang

== Sources ==
- Buswell, Robert Jr; Lopez, Donald S. Jr., eds. (2013), Princeton Dictionary of Buddhism., Princeton, NJ: Princeton University Press, ISBN 9780691157863
- Chappell, David W. (1987), "Is Tendai Buddhism Relevant to the Modern World?" (PDF), Japanese Journal of Religious Studies, 14 (2/3), doi:10.18874/jjrs.14.2-3.1987.247-266, archived from the original on March 4, 2009
- Cleary, J.C. (1996), Mind-seal of the Buddhas: patriarch Ou-i's commentary on the Amitabha Sutra (PDF), Australia: The Amitabha Buddha Association of Queensland.
- Donner, Neal (1991), "Sudden and Gradual Intimately Conjoined: Chih-i's Tíen-t'ai View", in Gregory, Peter N. (ed.), Sudden and Gradual. Approaches to Enlightenment in Chinese Thought, Delhi: Motilal Banarsidass Publishers Private Limited
- Fa Qing (August 30, 2013). The Śamatha and Vipaśyanā in Tian Tai (PDF). Poh Ming Tse Symposium 2013: One Master Three Meditative Traditions. Singapore. pp. 30–47. Archived from the original (PDF) on 2015-05-24.
- Getz, Daniel Aaron (1994), Siming Zhili and Tiantai Pure Land In the Song Dynasty (PHD Dissertation), Yale University
- Getz, Daniel A. (2022-05-23), "CHAPTER 12 T'ien-t'ai Pure Land Societies and the Creation of the Pure Land Patriarchate", in Getz, Daniel A.; Gregory, Peter N. (eds.), Buddhism in the Sung, University of Hawaii Press, pp. 477–523, doi:10.1515/9780824843649-014, ISBN 978-0-8248-4364-9
- Groner, Paul (2000), Saicho : The Establishment of the Japanese Tendai School, University of Hawaii Press, ISBN 0824823710
- Hua, Hsuan (1977), The Shurangama Sutra, Volume 1, Dharma Realm Buddhist Association
- Huai-Chin, Nan (1997), Basic Buddhism: Exploring Buddhism and Zen, York Beach, Maine: Samuel Weiser, ISBN 1578630207
- Luk, Charles (1964), The Secrets of Chinese Meditation, London: Rider
- Lusthaus, Dan (1998). "The Chinese Buddhist Schools: Tiantai.". Routledge Encyclopedia of Philosophy: Buddhist philosophy, Chinese. Taylor and Francis. doi:10.4324/9780415249126-G002-1.
- Ng, Yu-kwan (1990), Chih-i and Madhyamika (dissertation), Hamilton, Ontario: McMaster University, archived from the original on 2014-02-03
- Orzech, Charles D; Sorensen, Henrik Hjort; Payne, Richard Karl (2010), Esoteric Buddhism and the tantras in East Asia, Boston: Brill, ISBN 978-90-04-20401-0
- Snelling, John (1987), The Buddhist handbook. A Complete Guide to Buddhist Teaching and Practice, London: Century Paperbacks
- Williams, Paul (2008), Mahayana Buddhism: The Doctrinal Foundations (2nd ed.), Routledge
- Wu, Jiang (2008), Enlightenment in Dispute: The Reinvention of Chan Buddhism in Seventeenth Century China, Oxford University Press
- Wu, Rujun (1993), T'ien-T'ai Buddhism and early Mādhyamika, National Foreign Language Center Technical Reports, Buddhist studies program. University of Hawaii Press, ISBN 978-0-8248-1561-5
- Zhang, Hanruo (2024), Bridging the Other World: Pure Land Buddhism and Literati Culture in Song Dynasty China (960–1276) (Doctoral Dissertation), Princeton University.
- Zhe, Ji; Fisher, Gareth; Laliberté, André (2020), Buddhism after Mao: Negotiations, Continuities, and Reinventions, University of Hawaii Press.
- Ziporyn, Brook (1994), "Anti-Chan Polemics in Post-Tang Tiantai", Journal of the International Association of Buddhist Studies, 17 (1): 26–65
- Ziporyn, Brook (2004), Being and ambiguity: philosophical experiments with Tiantai Buddhism, Illinois: OpenCourt, ISBN 978-0-8126-9542-7
- Ziporyn, Brook (2004b), "Tiantai School", in Buswell, Robert E. (ed.), Encyclopedia of Buddhism, New York: McMillan, ISBN 0-02-865910-4
- Ziporyn, Brook (2022). "Tiantai Buddhism". In Zalta, Edward N. (ed.). Stanford Encyclopedia of Philosophy. The Metaphysics Research Lab, Center for the Study of Language and Information, Stanford University. ISSN 1095-5054. OCLC 643092515. Archived from the original on 13 November 2022.
