= Nanyue Huisi =

Chinese Buddhist monk, (515-577)

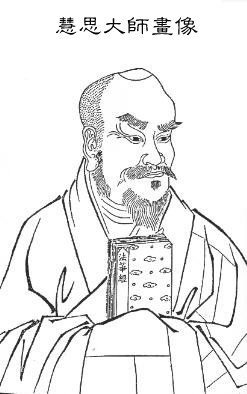
Huisi

Nanyue Huisi (Chinese: 南嶽慧思, 515-577), (Note: Also known as Hui-ssu or Grandmaster Nanyue, Jap.: Nangaku Eshi.) was an eminent Chinese Buddhist monk, traditionally regarded as the third patriarch of the Tiantai school. (Note: Nagarjuna and Huiwen are traditionally taken to be the first and second patriarch of the Tiantai school. Scholars of Buddhism name Zhiyi as the de facto founder of the Tiantai school.) According to Sasaki, Huisi "was the leading authority on the Lotus Sutra of his time."

== Biography ==
The earliest sources on Huisi's life are the "Vow Established by the Great Dhyana Master Huisi from Southern Peak", a work attributed to Huisi, (Note: This work claims to be written by Huisi in 559. The authenticity of the "Vow" is disputed) Daoxuan´s hagiography in the "Continued Biographies of Eminent Monks" (續高僧傳 Xù gāosēng zhuàn) and in his "Catalogue of [Buddhist] Works in the Imperial Collection of the Great Tang".

Born with the surname Li (李) in Wujin 武津 (Shangcai 上蔡, Henan 河南) in 515 CE, Huisi left home to join the monastic order at fourteen. By the age of nineteen, he undertook the full monastic precepts, thus becoming a fully ordained monk. Then he began visiting meditation masters in northern Henan.

He joined the community of Huiwen, who, according to Tiantai tradition, taught meditation techniques of the Great Perfection of Wisdom Treatise, a work purportedly written by Nagarjuna. Daoxuan (597-667) reports that after a ninety-day retreat under Huiwen's guidance, Huisi attained sudden enlightenment while leaning against a wall: "Within an instant of thought he attained the dharma-gate of the lotus samadhi". Guanding (561–632) writes: "The dharma-gates of both the Lesser Vehicle and Great Vehicle radiantly burst forth [for him]." Subsequently, Huisi began to give public lectures and to teach samadhi to an increasing number of disciples. However persecution by opposing monks, who ultimately tried to kill him, forced him to flee to south China in 552.

From 553–568 he lived and taught in Guangzhou (光州). Among his disciples were several gifted monks like Zhiyi, who studied on Mt. Dasu under Huisi from 560 to 567. Zhiyi would become the fourth patriarch in the Tiantai lineage. Daoxuan states that Huisi went to Mount Nan Yue in 568, where he founded the Yuquan Temple and trained his disciples.

== The lotus samadhi ==
Huisi taught two different forms of the lotus samadhi. The "practice devoid of characteristics", or the practice of ease and bliss, is based on the fourteenth chapter of the Lotus Sutra. Huisi explains, "While in the very midst of phenomena [the practitioner discerns that] mental characteristics are quiescent and extinguished and ultimately do not arise. (...) He is constantly immersed in all the profound and wonderful dhyana absorptions because in all activities – walking, standing, sitting, lying down, eating or speaking – his mind is always settled [in samadhi]."

The "practice possessing distinguishing characteristics" is based on the 28th chapter of the Lotus Sutra, "The Encouragement of Bodhisattva Samantabhadra". It is focused on the practice of reciting the Lotus Sutra and repentance.

== Works ==
- Mahayana Method of Cessation and Contemplation (dasheng zhiguan famen, 大乘止觀法門, T 46, 1924)
- Essential Methods for the Sequential Practice of Chan (ci di chan yao, 次第禪要, T 2060:50.564a16–17)
- Dharma-Gate of the Samādhi Wherein All Dharmas are Without Dispute (zhufa wuzheng sanmai famen, 諸法無諍三昧. 法門, T 46, 1923)
- The samadhi of freely following one's thought (sui ziyi sanmei)
- The meaning of the course of ease and bliss in the Lotus Sutra (fahua jing anlexing yi, T 46,1926)
- The Vow Established by the Great Dhyana Master Huisi from Southern Peak (Nanyue si da chan shi li shiyuan wen, 南嶽思大禪師立誓願文, T 46, 1933) (Note: complete French translation by Magnin)

== See also ==
- Cheontae
- Mahayana
- Tendai

== Sources ==
- Bary, Wm. Theodore de; Keene, Donald; Tanabe, George (2010). Sources of Japanese Tradition. Vol. 1: From Earliest Times to 1600. Columbia University Press. pp. 137–138. ISBN 978-0-231-51805-5.
- Buswell, Robert E., ed. (2013), The Princeton Dictionary of Buddhism, Princeton University Press, ISBN 978-0691157863
- Greene, Eric M. (2012). Meditation, Repentance, and Visionary Experience in Early Medieval Chinese Buddhism (PhD thesis). Berkeley: University of California.
- Hubbard, Jamie (2001), Absolute Delusion, Perfect Buddhahood: The Rise and Fall of a Chinese Heresy, University of Hawaii Press, ISBN 978-0-8248-2345-0
- Keown, Damien (2003). A Dictionary of Buddhism. Oxford New-York: Oxford University Press, US. ISBN 0-19-860560-9.
- Kubo, Tsugunari (2007), The Lotus Sutra (PDF), translated by Yuyama, Akira, Berkeley, Calif.: Numata Center for Buddhist Translation and Research, ISBN 978-1-886439-39-9, archived from the original (PDF) on May 21, 2015
- Lagerwey, John (2004). Religion and Chinese Society. Vol. 1. Hong Kong & Paris: Chinese University Press & École française d'Extrême-Orient. ISBN 978-962-996-123-7.
- Lin, Pei-Yin (2011). Precepts and Lineage in Chan Tradition (PDF). PhD thesis, SOAS, University of London.
- Luk, Charles (1964). The Secrets of Chinese Meditation. London: Rider.
- Magnin, Paul (1979). La vie et l'œuvre de Huisi (Les origines de la secte bouddhique chinoise du Tiantai). Paris: École Française d’Extrême-Orient, Adrien Maisonneuve. ISBN 2-85539-066-4.
- Magnin, Paul (1995). Les notions de "ding" (meditation) et hui (sagesse) dans le oevre de Huisi (515-577). Archéologie de la Chine. Vol. 9. Rapports sur les conférences de l'année 1993–1994. École pratique des hautes études. 4e section, sciences historiques et philologiques. pp. 152–153.
- Muller, Charles (2009). "Digital Dictionary of Buddhism". To practice the method of cessation and clear observation.
- Muller, Charles (2014). "Digital Dictionary of Buddhism". Huisi 慧思.
- Ng, Yu-kwan (1990). Chih-i and Madhyamika (PhD thesis). Hamilton, Ontario: McMaster University. Archived from the original on 2014-02-03.
- Penkover, Linda (1979), "In the Beginning ... Guanding and the Creation of Early Tiantai", Journal of the International Association of Buddhist Studies, 23 (2): 245–296
- Sasaki, Ruth Fuller (2009). Kirchner, Thomas Yūhō (ed.). The Record of Linji. Nanzan Library of Asian Religion and Culture. University of Hawaii Press. ISBN 978-0-8248-3319-0.
- Shinohara, Koichi (1998). Illess and Self, Zhiyuan´s two autobiographical essays. In: Albert I. Baumgarten, Jan Assmann, Gedaliahu A. G. Stroumsa, Guy G. Stroumsa (eds); Self, Soul, and Body in Religious Experience. Brill. ISBN 90-04-10943-9.
- Stevenson, Daniel B. (1986). "The Four Kinds of Samādhi in Early T'ien-t'ai Buddhism". In Gregory, Peter N. (ed.). Traditions of Meditation in Chinese Buddhism. Vol. 1. Honolulu: University of Hawaii Press. pp. 45–98. ISBN 0-8248-1088-0.
- Stevenson, Daniel B.; Kanno, Hiroshi (2006). The meaning of the Lotus sūtra's course of ease and bliss: an annotated translation and study of Nanyue Huisi's (515–577) Fahua jing anlexing yi (PDF). Tokyo: International Research Institute for Advanced Buddhology, Soka University. ISBN 499806228X. Archived from the original (PDF) on 2015-05-12.
- Wang, Ching-Wei (2009). "The Practice of Mahayana Si Nianchu in Sixth Century China: Huisi´s Interpretation of Si Nianchu in His Sui Ziyi Sanmai" (PDF). Chung-Hwa Buddhist Journal. 22: 153–178. Archived from the original (PDF) on May 17, 2015.
- Zhang, Fenglai (2015). A preliminary study of Buddhist thought of Huisi, the Tiantai school pioneer. In Lou Yulie (ed.), Buddhism. Brill. pp. 106–121. ISBN 978-90-474-2797-1.
