= Mohe Zhiguan =

Buddhist major doctrinal treatise

The Mohe Zhiguan (T. 1911), or the Larger Treatise on Cessation and Contemplation (Chinese: 摩訶止観; pinyin: Móhē Zhǐguān; Japanese pronunciation: Makashikan) is a major Buddhist doctrinal treatise based on lectures given by the Chinese Tiantai patriarch Zhiyi (538–597 CE) in 594. These lectures were compiled and edited by Zhiyi´s disciple Guanding (561-632) into seven chapters in ten fascicles.

The voluminous Mohe Zhiguan is a comprehensive Buddhist doctrinal summa that discusses meditation and various key Buddhist doctrines which were very influential in the development of Buddhist meditation and Buddhist philosophy in China. It is one of the central texts of Tiantai (and Japanese Tendai).

== Overview ==
The Mohe Zhiguan is one of three major works attributed to Zhiyi, the founder of the Tiantai school. While his other two great works focus primarily on doctrine, the Mohe Zhiguan presents these same ideas in the context of Buddhist practice, framed by the dual concepts of cessation or śamatha (Ch. 止 zhi) and contemplation or vipaśyana (Ch. 觀 guan).

The Mohe Zhiguan holds a significant place in Buddhist scholarship. This influential treatise is not only remarkable for its profound insights but also for its comprehensive and methodical approach to both the theoretical and practical aspects of the Buddha Dharma. Thus, the Mohe Zhiguan is far more than a meditation manual. It is a comprehensive outline of the Mahayana Buddhist tradition, encompassing a vast range of teachings and practices, including the Abhidharma, the Agamas, Madhyamaka treatises (esp. Da zhi du lun), and Mahayana sutras such as the Lotus Sutra, the Nirvana Sutra, the Avatamsaka Sutra, the Vimalakirti Sutra, the Pure Land sutras, and the Prajnaparamita sutras.

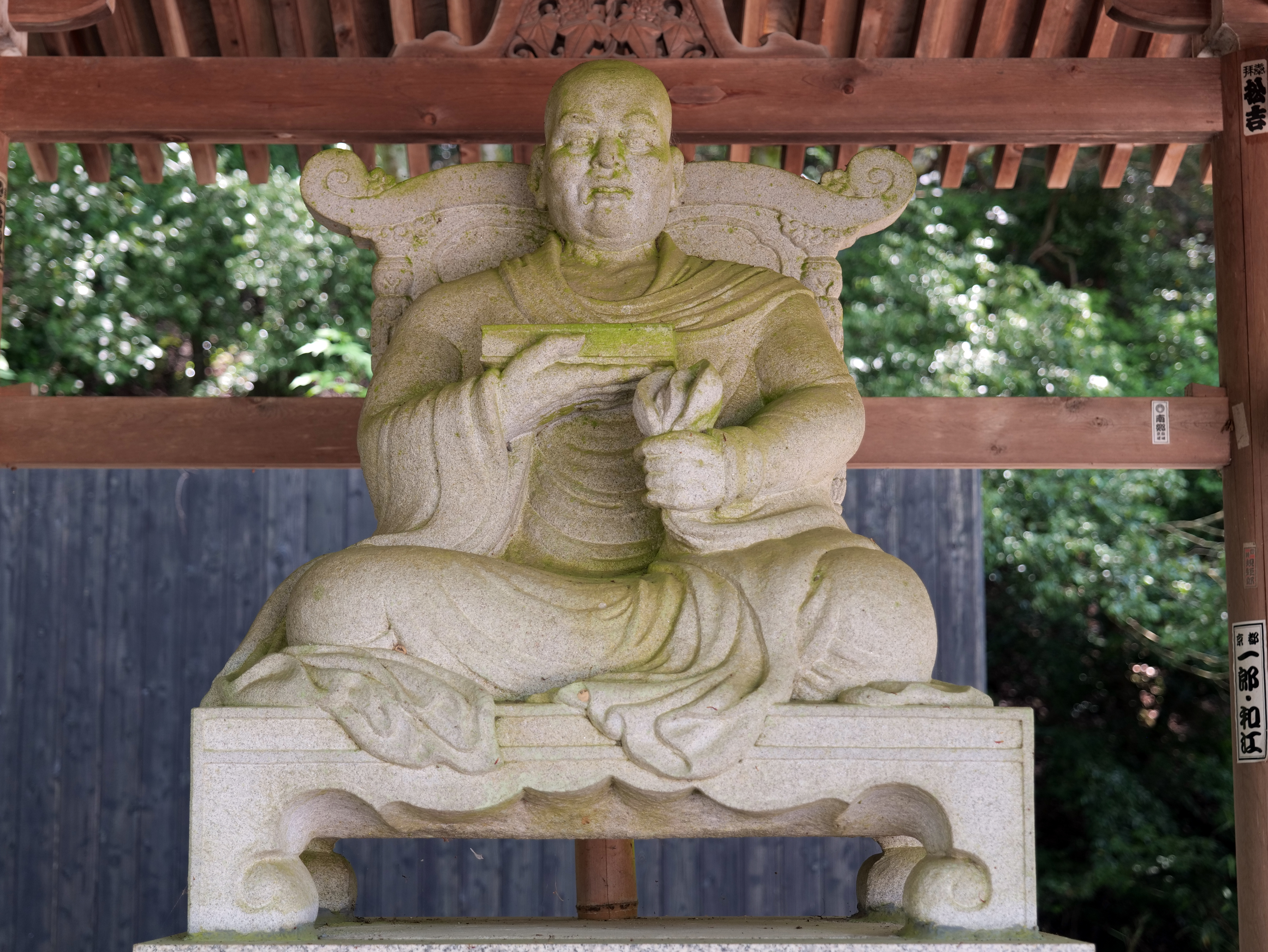
Statue of Zhiyi holding a scripture, at Mii-dera temple, Shiga prefecture, Japan

Earlier in his career, Zhiyi wrote extensively on Buddhist practice, detailing meditation techniques in works such as the Essential Methods for Practicing the Seated Meditation of Cessation and Contemplation (Ch: 修習止觀坐禪法要 Xiuxi zhiguan zuochan fayao; often dubbed 天台小止觀 Tiantai xiao zhiguan, Tiantai's Short Cessation and Contemplation; T no. 1915). His earlier texts outline a gradual and systematic approach to meditation, while the Mohe Zhiguan emphasizes the "perfect-and-sudden" method. Notably, in his early writings, Zhiyi often employed the term "chan" (zen) to describe Buddhist meditation but later favored "zhi-guan," reflecting a more holistic vision of Buddhist practice.

The Mohe Zhiguan is also significant for its synthesis of diverse Buddhist traditions. Given that Buddhist texts and practices were introduced to China in a fragmented manner, one of Zhiyi's key achievements was creating a coherent and structured system that integrated these varied elements. His doctrinal classification system (panjiao) is considered one of the most effective frameworks for organizing Buddhist teachings, rooted in the Lotus Sutra's concept of the One Vehicle (ekayana) and its teaching on skillful means (upaya). Zhiyi's system blends diverse Buddhist practices into a cohesive structure, organized around the threefold pattern of emptiness, conventionality, and the Middle Way.

These contributions had a lasting influence on subsequent Buddhist traditions. The Mohe Zhiguan's "four samadhis"—which encompass constant sitting, constant walking, a combination of both, and a "free and unbounded" samadhi—directly influenced later practices such as Chan/Zen "just sitting" meditation and Pure Land nianfo recitation. The inclusion of esoteric elements like dhāraṇī within this system also influenced Japanese Shingon and Tendai traditions.

=== Zhiguan meditation ===
A major focus of the Mohe Zhiguan is the practice of śamatha (止 zhǐ, calming or stabilizing meditation) and vipaśyana (觀 guān, clear seeing or insight). Zhiyi teaches two types of zhiguan - in sitting meditation and responding to objects following conditions or practicing mindfully in daily life. Zhiyi uses quotes from all the Mahayana sutras available in China at the time and tries to include all doctrines into his meditation system.

The text is founded firmly on scripture, every key assertion of the text is supported by sutra quotations. In the Mohe Zhiguan, Zhiyi also discusses several key Buddhist doctrines in its exposition of meditative praxis. A major doctrinal view of the work is that of the superiority of the practice of "sudden" samatha-vipassana, which sees the ultimate reality present at the very start of one's practice. In the fifth volume of this treatise, Zhiyi reveals the doctrine of "three thousand realms in a single life-moment" (ichinen sanzen), which is considered to be the essence of his teachings.

Zhiyi divides his meditation system into three major sets, the "twenty-five skillful devices", the "Four samādhis" (Chinese: 四種三昧; pinyin: sizhǒng sānmèi) and the "ten modes of contemplation". The "twenty-five skillful devices" are preparatory practices which include keeping the five precepts, being in a quiet place, adjusting food intake and posture as well as restraining desire in the five senses and restraining the five hindrances.

The four samadhis are designed for beginners who wish to practice meditation intensively. They are:

- "Constantly Seated Samādhi" (chángzuò sānmèi 常坐三昧) - 90 days of motionless sitting, leaving the seat only for reasons of natural need.
- "Constantly Walking Samādhi" (chángxíng sānmèi 常行三昧) - 90 days of mindful walking and meditating on Amitabha.
- "Half-Walking Half-Seated Samādhi" (bànxíng bànzuò sānmèi 半行半坐三昧) - Includes various practices such as chanting, contemplation of the emptiness of all dharmas and the "Lotus samādhi" which includes penance, prayer, worship of the Buddhas, and reciting the Lotus sutra.
- "Neither Walking nor Sitting Samādhi" (fēixíng fēizuò sānmèi 非行非坐三昧) - This includes "the awareness of mental factors" as they arise in the mind. One is to contemplate them as "not moving, not originated, not extinguished, not coming, not going.”

After the meditator has practiced the four samadhis, he then moves on to contemplating the "ten objects":

1. Contemplating the skandhas, ayatanas and dhātus. By itself this part takes up one fifth of the entire book.
2. Kleshas
3. Illness
4. The karmic marks
5. Demonic forces appearing in one's mind
6. Various forms of dhyāna which might be distracting
7. False views
8. Overwhelming pride
9. Śrāvaka-hood or the idea that Pratyekabuddha-hood is the ultimate goal (instead of full Buddhahood)
10. The idea that Bodhisattva-hood is the ultimate goal

The core of the exposition is taken up by the skandhas, ayatanas and dhatus, which are to be contemplated in ten "modes":

1. Contemplating objects as inconceivable.
2. Arousing compassionate thoughts (bodhicitta), vowing to save all beings
3. Skillful means for easing one's mind.
4. The thorough deconstruction of dharmas, the seeing of dharmas as being empty frees one of all attachment.
5. Knowing what penetrates and what obstructs the path.
6. Cultivating the steps to the path (the thirty seven aids to nirvana)
7. Regulating through auxiliary methods.
8. Knowing the stages of development in the path.
9. Peace through patient recognition.
10. Avoiding passionate attachment to dharmas.

The concept of the three truths is a key element in Zhiyi's exposition of the practice of contemplation. Zhiyi's "perfectly integrated threefold truth" is an extension of Nagarjuna's Two truths doctrine. This "round and inter-inclusive" truth is made up of emptiness, conventional existence, and the middle way between the first two, a simultaneous and integral affirmation of both. Contemplating a mental moment with regard to this truth or "threefold contemplation within one moment of mental activity" (yixin sanguan) is seen as the highest form of contemplation and as the ultimate form of realization. It leads to universal salvation (du zhongsheng) because through the transformation of oneself, one can therefore transform others.

== Commentaries ==
Major commentaries on this text in the Tiantai and Tendai tradition include:

1. Zhanran’s (湛然) (711-782) Zhiguan fuxing zhuan hongjue 止觀 輔行傳弘決
2. Hōchibō Shōshin’s (寶地坊證真) (c. 1136-1220) Shiki 私記
3. Echō Chikū’s (慧澄癡空) (1780-1862) Kōgi (講義)
4. Daihō Shūdatsu’s (大寶守脱) (1804-1884) Kōjutsu 講述.

The first is a Chinese commentary by the sixth Tiantai patriarch; the latter three are Japanese works.

== Bibliography ==
=== Translations ===
- Donner, Neal; Stevenson, Daniel B. (1993). The Great Calming and Contemplation: A Study and Annotated Translation of the First Chapter of Chih-i’s Mohe Zhiguan. Honolulu: University of Hawaii Press.
- Swanson, Paul L.; trans. (2004). The Great Cessation and Contemplation (Mohe Zhiguan, Chapter 1-6), CD-ROM, Tokyo: Kosei Publishing Co.
- _____. trans. (2017) Clear Serenity, Quiet Insight: T'ien-t'ai Chih-i's Mohe Zhiguan, 3 vols., Honolulu: University of Hawai'i Press.
- Swanson, Paul L.; trans. (2024). Great Cessation-And-Contemplation Vol. 1, Vol. 2, Bukkyō Dendō Kyōkai

=== Articles ===
- Toshirō, Yamano (1987). Review: Makashikan kenkyū josetsu (摩訶止觀研究序説) (Prolegomena to the Study of the Mo ho chih kuan) by Rosan Ikeda; 池田魯參 . Japanese Journal of Religious Studies 14 (2/3), 267-270
