= Huiwen =

Chinese Buddhist

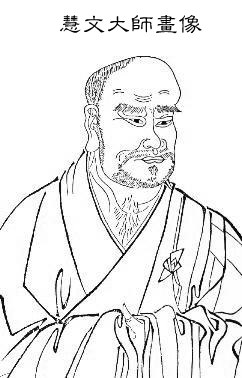
Huìwén (慧文)

Huiwen (慧 文) is considered to be the first patriarch of the Chinese Buddhist School Tiantai. He derived from the Gao (高) family in the current Bohai region of Shandong, under the Northern Qi Dynasty, which ruled northeast China between 550 and 577. Huiwen´s doctrine on the 'simultaneity of the mind in the three wisdoms' (一心 三 智 yīxīn sānzhì) was later developed by his disciple Huìsī in 'simultaneity of the minds in the three consciousnesses'.
