= Jingxi =

Jingxi may refer to:

== Places in China ==
=== Towns ===
- Jingxi, Minhou County, Fujian
- Jingxi, Wanyuan, Sichuan

=== Subdistricts ===
- Jingxi Subdistrict, Sanming, in Sanyuan District, Sanming, Fujian
- Jingxi Subdistrict, Guangzhou, in Baiyun District, Guangzhou, Guangdong
- Jingxi Subdistrict, Nanchong, in Shunqing District, Nanchong, Sichuan

=== Other administrative divisions ===
- Jingxi, Guangxi, a county-level city administered by Baise, Guangxi
- Jingxi Circuit, a circuit (province) during the Song dynasty

=== Landmarks ===
- Jingxi Hotel, in Beijing
- Jingxi Road station, in Shanghai

== People ==
- Jingxi (prince) (1668–1717), Prince Xi of the Second Rank of the Qing dynasty
- Li Jingxi, Qing Dynasty and Republic of China statesman
- Wang Jingxi, Taiwanese lyricist
- Yu Jingxi, Chinese professional League of Legends player
- Jingxi Zhanran, Chinese Buddhist monk

== Other uses ==
- Peking opera, a Chinese opera genre, alternately known as Jingxi

== See also ==
- Jinxi (disambiguation)
