= Daosui =

Tang dynasty Buddhist monk

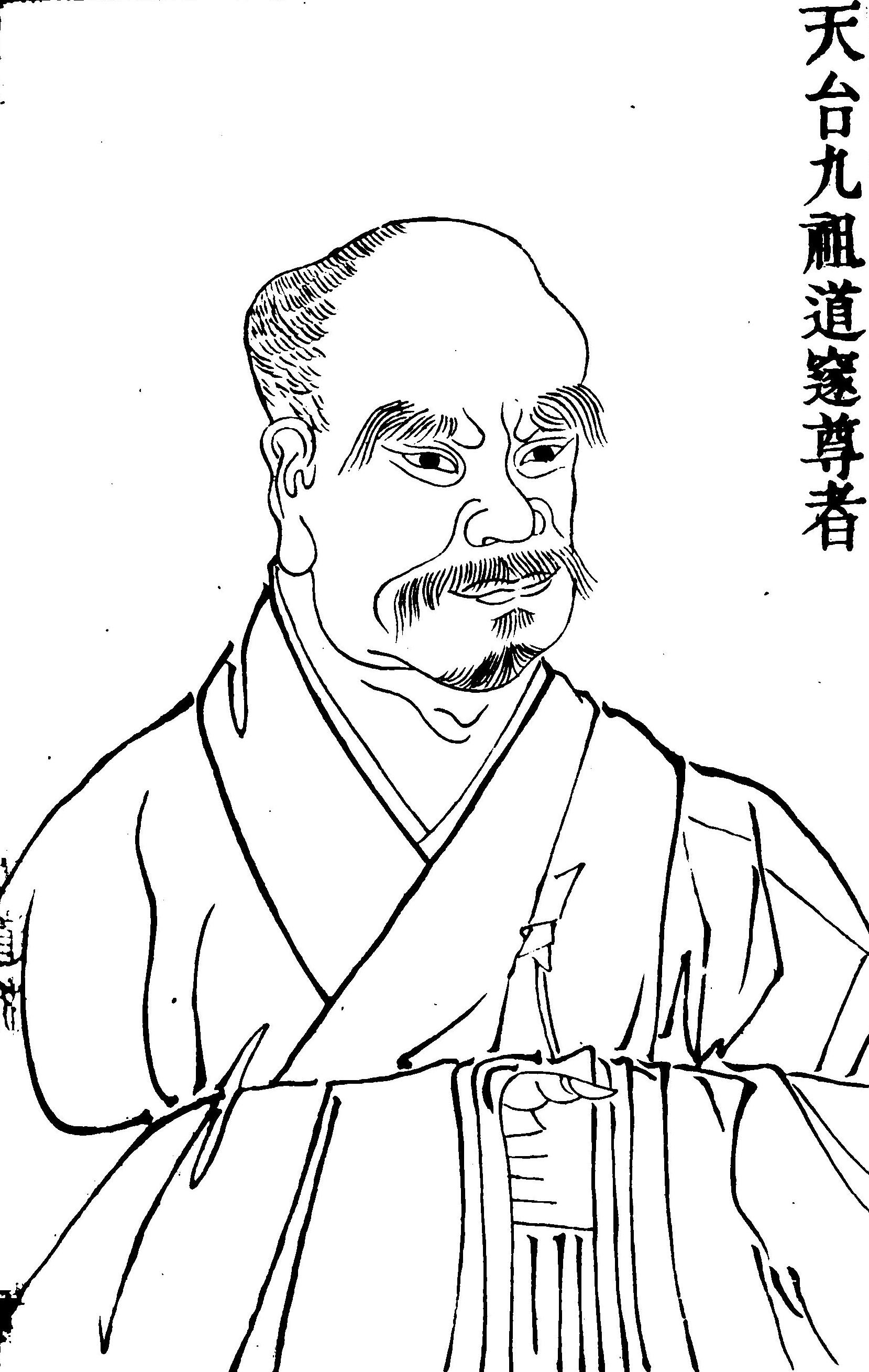
Daosui

Dàosuì (道邃, Jp: Dōzui, floruit 796–805) was Tang dynasty Buddhist monk from Chang'an and a student of the Tiantai patriarch Zhanran 湛然 (711–782). Daosui is known for transmitting the Tiantai teachings to Saichō, the founder of the Japanese Tendai school and is thus considered to be the seventh patriarch of the Tendai tradition. Daosui was posthumously honored with the title Xingdao Zunzhe (Venerable One Who Promotes the Way). He was also commonly referred to as Shikan Washō (Master of Śamatha-Vipaśyanā).

== Life ==
Daosui was a native of Chang'an. His birth and death dates are not clearly recorded in historical sources. His secular surname was Wang. Before ordination, he served in the Tang court as a Jiancha Yushi (Censor). Later, he renounced his prestigious position, became a monk, and received the full bhikṣu precepts at the age of 24.

Originally, Daosui was a high-ranking official in the Tang government. However, he retired from his official position and entered the monastic life. During the Dali era (766–779), he became a disciple of Zhanran, the sixth patriarch of the Tiantai school, studying with him at Miaole Monastery (妙樂寺). Over the course of five years, he diligently pursued his studies and ultimately attained an understanding of the essential principle of the Tiantai school. He was praised for his profound insight into subtle and profound doctrines, free from attachment or obstruction. Zhanran commended his understanding of the Dharma, even saying, "You, my disciple, can succeed in advancing my teachings." Consequently, Zhanran entrusted Daosui with the Zhiguan Fuxing Ji (Supplementary Notes on Śamatha-Vipaśyanā), hoping that Daosui would promote the Tiantai meditation teachings. Daosui's talent even earned the admiration of Yuanhao, another of Zhanran's disciples.

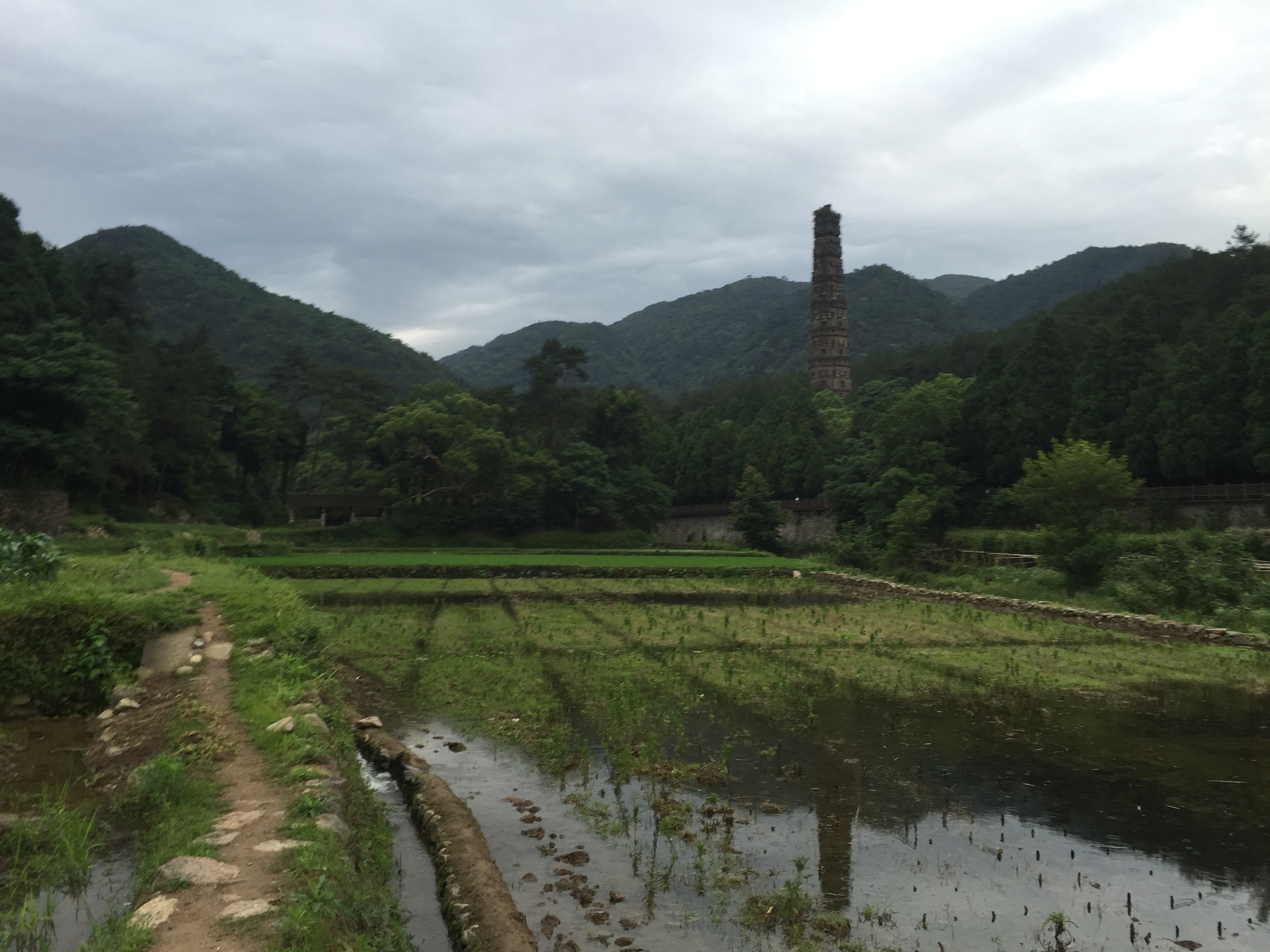
A view of Tiantai Mountain and the pagoda of Guoqing Temple, constructed during the Sui dynasty (6th century CE).

Afterward, Daosui continued his travels, giving lectures throughout the Jiangnan region. In 796, he entered Mount Tiantai and undertook the task of guiding the monastic community there. Throughout this period, he tirelessly lectured on the Lotus Sūtra, the Mohe zhiguan, and the precepts in various cities, including Yangzhou.

In 804, while Daosui was traveling from Mount Tiantai to Longxing Temple in Linhai, Taizhou, to deliver a lecture on the Mohe Zhiguan, he encountered the Japanese monk Saichō, whom he took as a student. After Saichō had completed his studies at Mount Tiantai, he returned to Taizhou and devoted himself to copying scriptures. Later, Daosui, along with Yizhen, conferred the Mahayana Bodhisattva Precepts (Perfect Teaching Bodhisattva Precepts) upon Saichō. That same year, Saichō returned to Japan and founded the Japanese Tendai school, which integrated Tiantai, Esoteric (Mikkyō), and Chan teachings into a unique tradition. Out of respect, Saichō and his disciples honored Daosui as the founding patriarch of the Japanese Tendai school.

Some of his Chinese disciples include Qianshu, Shousu, and Guangxiu.

== Teachings ==
Daosui's view of Tiantai teaching was a syncretic one, matching the spirit of the times. He advocated the integration of the various Buddhist schools of Chinese Buddhism (Vinaya school, Heze Chan, Mantrayana) under the umbrella of Zhiyi's universalist Tiantai school.

As a student of Zhanran, Daosui upheld and expanded on his master's views. He developed the integration of the Huayan teaching of "nature-origination" (xingqi) as found in Fazang into the Tiantai teaching of "nature-inclusion" (xingju), as well as defending the doctrine of the "Buddha-nature of the insentient" as taught in works like Zhanran's Adamantine Scalpel (金剛錍 Jin'gang Pi).

Furthermore, as noted by Paul Groner, Daosui teachings on meditation "may have varied from standard T'ien-t'ai practices":

Chih-li 知禮 (960-1028), a Sung dynasty monk who tried to reform the T'ien-t'ai School, noted that Tao-sui's teaching on T'ien-t'ai meditation practices deviated from the orthodox position. Chih-li's charge is especially interesting when it is juxtaposed with Saichō's statement that Tao-sui taught him how to realize the three views in an instant (isshin sankan) through a single word. This passage suggests that Tao-sui may have utilized Ch'an practices.

Daosui's syncretism influenced the Japanese monk Saichō, who developed his new Japanese Tendai tradition in a similar syncretic direction, merging esoteric Buddhism with the Tiantai teachings.

== Works ==
Daosui authored several surviving works, including:

- Da panniepan jing shu siji 大般涅槃經疏私記 (Private Notes on the Commentary on the Mahāparinirvāṇa Sūtra, 10 fascicles)
- Weimojing shu siji 維摩經疏私記 (Private Notes on the Commentary on the Vimalakīrti Sūtra, 3 fasc.)
- Mohe zhiguan ji zhong yiyi 摩訶止觀記中異義 (Different Interpretations of the Mohe Zhiguan, 1 fasc.)

There are also three surviving sub-commentaries to Zhanran's commentaries on Zhiyi's three major works which are attributed to Daosui. However, modern scholars are in disagreement regarding their attribution to the Chinese Daosui or to a Japanese monk named Dozui (d. 1157). According to Groner, "Tokiwa Daijo and Okubo Ryojun have offered convincing arguments for the thesis that the works are of Chinese origin, but the issue has still not been satisfactorily resolved."
