= Jinxi =

Jinxi may refer to the following locations in China:

- Huludao, Liaoning
- Jinxi County (金溪县), Fuzhou, Jiangxi
- Jinxi, Hengyang (金溪镇), a town of Hengyang County, Hunan.
- Jinxi, Kunshan (锦溪镇), a town in Kunshan, a city in Jiangsu Province
- Jinxi, Longquan (锦溪镇), a town in Longquan, a city in Zhejiang Province

== See also ==
- Jin Xi (Han), a Han general during the Chu-Han Contention
- Jingxi (disambiguation)
- Shanxi clique, also called "Jin clique" which is Jìn Xì in Pinyin.
