= Baisha, Minhou County =

Baisha 白沙镇
- Town
- Location in Fujian Baisha (China)
- Coordinates: 26.2039°N 119.0771°E
- Country: People's Republic of China
- Province: Fujian
- Prefecture-level city: Fuzhou
- County: Minhou County
- Time zone: UTC+8 (China Standard)

Baisha (Chinese: 白沙) is a town of Minhou County, Fujian, China. As of 2018, it has 4 residential communities and 21 villages under its administration.
