= Minhou County =

County in Fuzhou, Fujian, China

Minhou 闽侯县 Minhow
- County
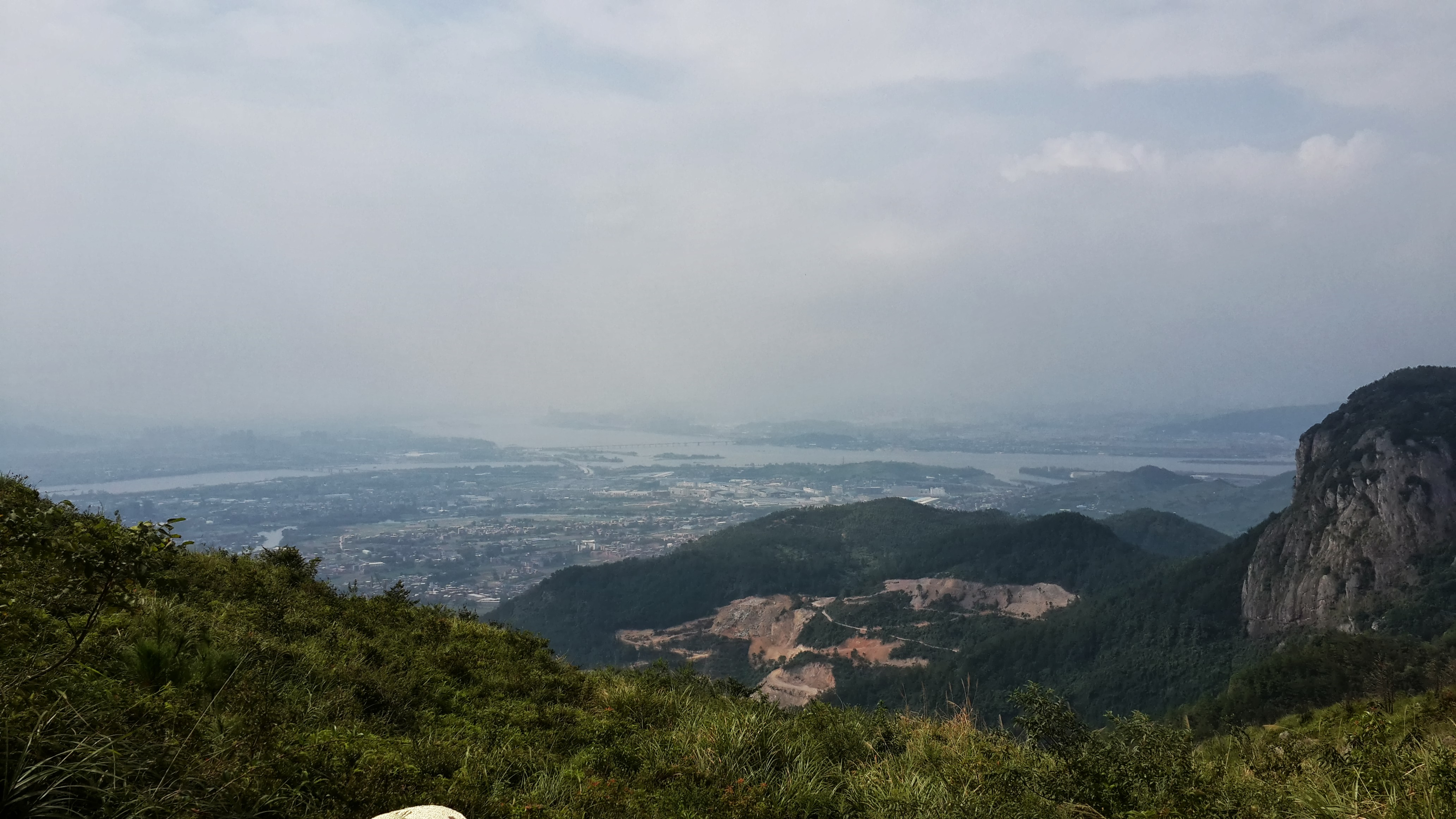

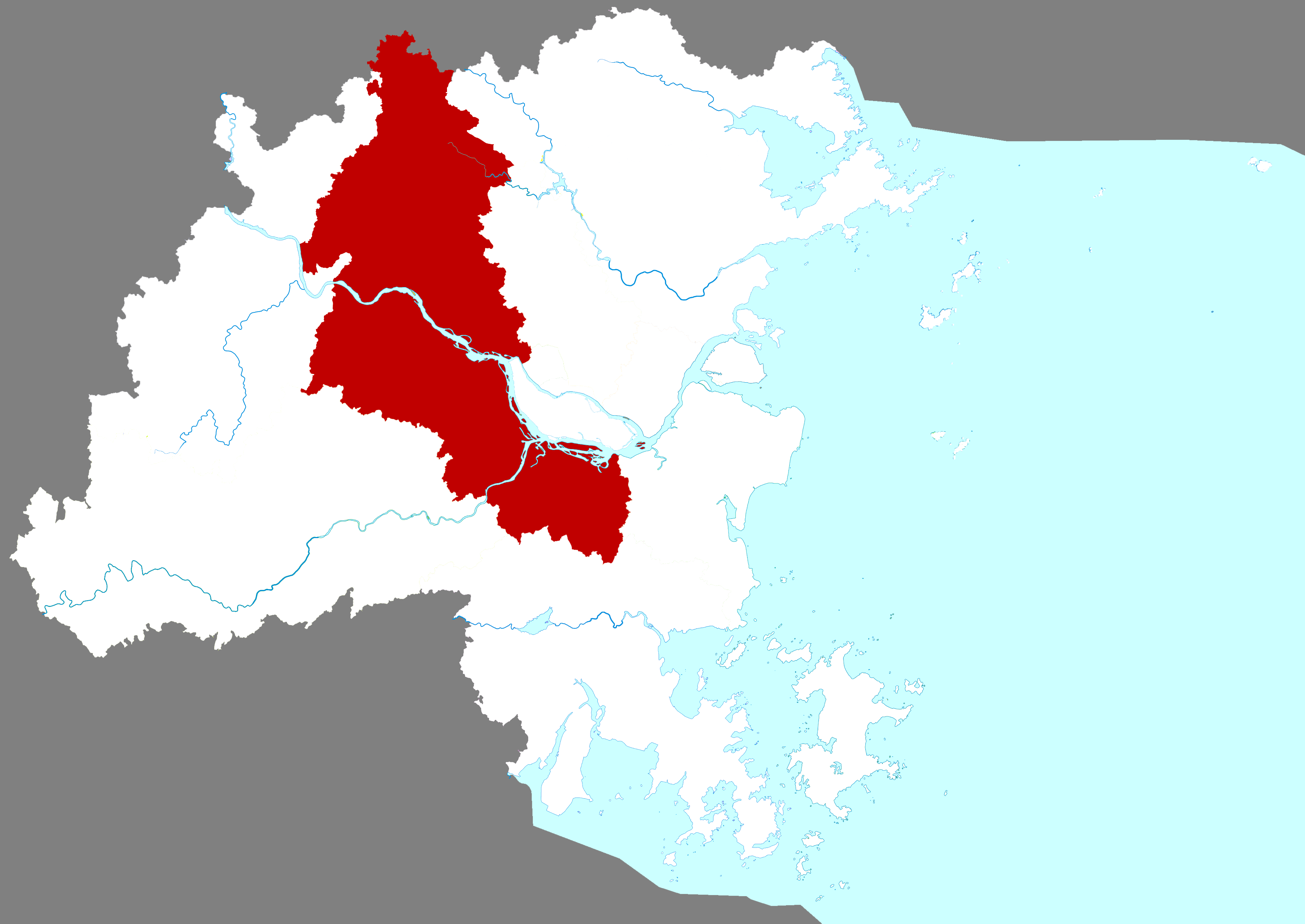
- Minhou County within Fuzhou

- Location of the seat in Fujian
- Coordinates: 26°09′00″N 119°07′55″E
- Country: People's Republic of China
- Province: Fujian
- Prefecture-level city: Fuzhou

Area
  - Total: 2,136 km^{2} (825 sq mi)

Population (2020)
  - Total: 988,200
  - Density: 462.6/km^{2} (1,198/sq mi)
- Time zone: UTC+8 (China Standard)

Minhou County (simplified Chinese: 闽侯; traditional Chinese: 閩侯; pinyin: Mǐnhòu; in Fuzhounese, Foochow Romanized: Mìng-âu, IPA: /miŋ˨˩ ŋɑu˨˦˨/) is a county in eastern Fujian Province, China. It is under the administration of the prefecture-level city of Fuzhou, the provincial capital, and lies to the south and to the west of the urban area of Fuzhou. The Min River flows in a southeast direction through the center of the county, and then to the urban area of Fuzhou and into the Taiwan Strait.

== Administrative divisions ==
The county has one subdistrict, eight towns and six townships.

Subdistrict

- Ganzhe Subdistrict (甘蔗街道)

Towns

- Baisha Town (白沙镇), Nanyu Town (南屿镇), Shanggan Town (尚干镇), Xiangqian Town (祥谦镇), Qingkou Town (青口镇), Nantong Town (南通镇), Shangjie Town (上街镇), Jingxi Town (荆溪镇)

Townships

- Zhuqi Township (竹岐乡), Pengwei Township (鸿尾乡), Yangli Township (洋里乡), Dahu Township (大湖乡), Tingping Township (廷坪乡), Xiaoruo Township (小箬乡)

== History ==
In August 2014, 396 villagers from Qingpuling (青布岭村) of Qingkou Town won a court case against a waste management company. They were awarded 6,000,000 RMB in compensation. The waste company set up their medical waste incineration facility back in 2000. The pollution caused black dust or ash to contaminate the surrounding environment trees, plants, waterways and households. Residents had suspected the cancer rates was due to the environmental pollution from the incineration plant. The government has offered relocation for the affected ones.

== Climate ==
Climate data for Minhou, elevation 58 m (190 ft), (1991–2020 normals, extremes 1981–present)
Month	Jan	Feb	Mar	Apr	May	Jun	Jul	Aug	Sep	Oct	Nov	Dec	Year
Record high °C (°F)	27.3 (81.1)	31.1 (88.0)	32.8 (91.0)	34.8 (94.6)	38.8 (101.8)	37.9 (100.2)	41.5 (106.7)	39.5 (103.1)	38.9 (102.0)	36.0 (96.8)	33.4 (92.1)	29.2 (84.6)	41.5 (106.7)
Mean daily maximum °C (°F)	15.7 (60.3)	16.8 (62.2)	19.4 (66.9)	24.3 (75.7)	27.9 (82.2)	31.1 (88.0)	34.6 (94.3)	33.9 (93.0)	31.2 (88.2)	27.1 (80.8)	22.8 (73.0)	17.9 (64.2)	25.2 (77.4)
Daily mean °C (°F)	11.3 (52.3)	12.0 (53.6)	14.4 (57.9)	19.0 (66.2)	23.1 (73.6)	26.6 (79.9)	29.3 (84.7)	28.7 (83.7)	26.4 (79.5)	22.3 (72.1)	18.2 (64.8)	13.4 (56.1)	20.4 (68.7)
Mean daily minimum °C (°F)	8.3 (46.9)	8.9 (48.0)	11.0 (51.8)	15.3 (59.5)	19.6 (67.3)	23.3 (73.9)	25.4 (77.7)	25.1 (77.2)	23.1 (73.6)	18.8 (65.8)	15.0 (59.0)	10.2 (50.4)	17.0 (62.6)
Record low °C (°F)	−0.7 (30.7)	−1.3 (29.7)	0.8 (33.4)	5.7 (42.3)	11.6 (52.9)	15.1 (59.2)	20.6 (69.1)	20.7 (69.3)	14.8 (58.6)	9.3 (48.7)	3.9 (39.0)	−1.9 (28.6)	−1.9 (28.6)
Average precipitation mm (inches)	57.9 (2.28)	80.5 (3.17)	132.3 (5.21)	145.6 (5.73)	191.0 (7.52)	239.8 (9.44)	153.3 (6.04)	174.2 (6.86)	122.8 (4.83)	51.9 (2.04)	53.2 (2.09)	47.3 (1.86)	1,449.8 (57.07)
Average precipitation days (≥ 0.1 mm)	10.8	13.7	17.5	15.9	17.3	17.3	12.1	14.8	11.2	6.8	8.1	9.6	155.1
Average snowy days	0	0.1	0	0	0	0	0	0	0	0	0	0.1	0.1
Average relative humidity (%)	76	78	79	78	80	82	76	78	75	72	74	74	77
Mean monthly sunshine hours	99.2	87.8	99.2	119.8	125.6	135.5	226.3	202.9	163.8	154.4	117.8	111.7	1,644
Percentage possible sunshine	30	28	27	31	30	33	54	51	45	44	36	34	37
Source: China Meteorological AdministrationAll-time May high
