= Saichō =

8/9th-century Japanese Buddhist monk; founder of the Tendai sect

Saichō (最澄)
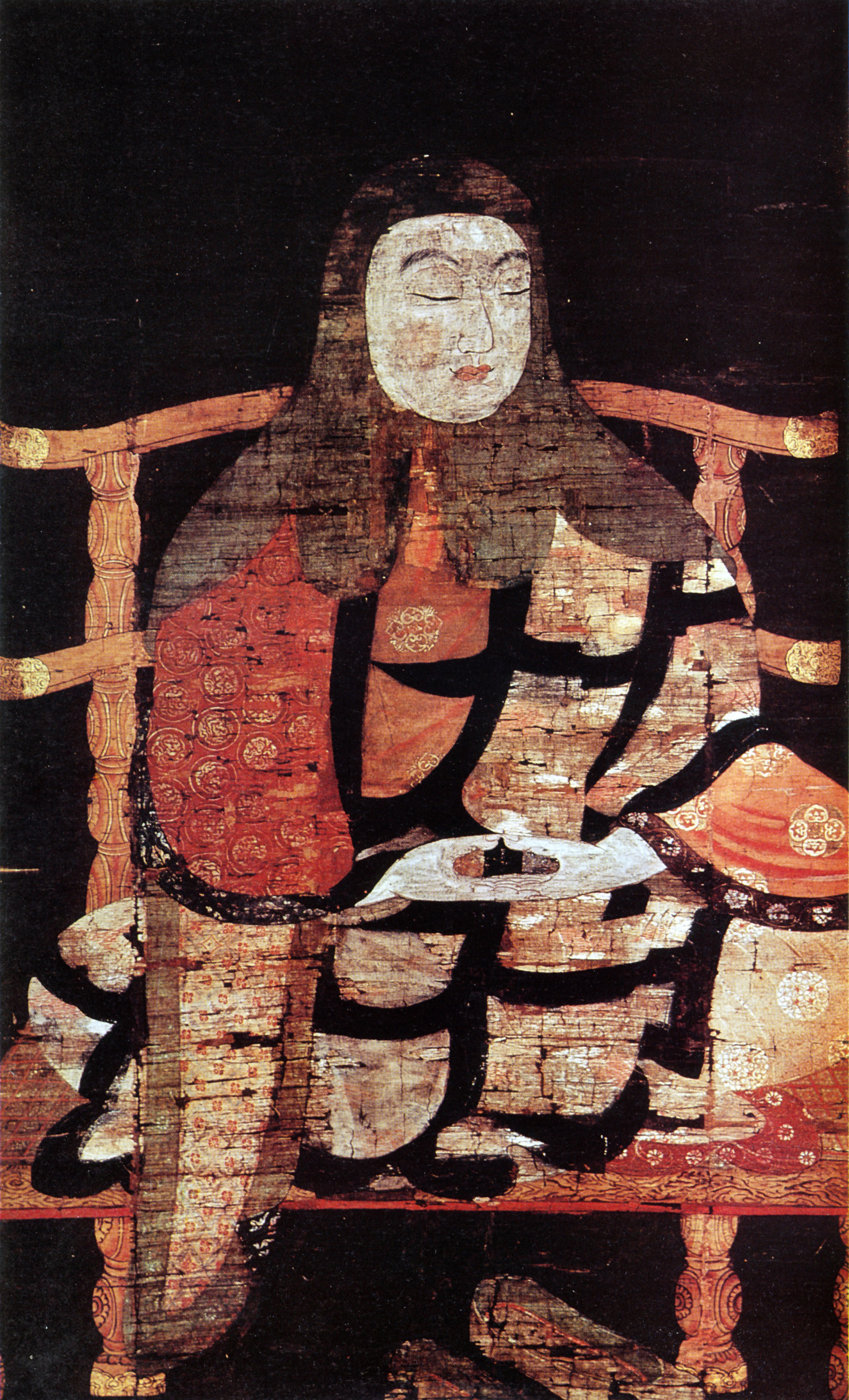
- Painting of Saichō
- Title: Founder of Tendai Buddhism

Personal life
- Born: Mitsu no Obitohirono 三津 首広野; September 15, 767
- Died: June 26, 822 (age 54)

Religious life
- Religion: Buddhism
- School: Tendai

Senior posting
- Teacher: Gyōhyō (行表)
- Successor: Gishin (義真)

Saichō (最澄; Japanese pronunciation: [saꜜi.tɕoː], September 15, 767 – June 26, 822) was a Japanese Buddhist monk credited with founding the Japanese Tendai school of Buddhism. He was awarded the posthumous title of Dengyō Daishi (伝教大師).

Recognized for his significant contributions to the development of Japanese Buddhism, Saichō is most famous for introducing the Chinese Tiantai school to Japan, which he adapted into the Tendai tradition. Saichō traveled to Tang China in 804, where he studied the Chinese Tiantai school (along with other traditions). After returning to Japan, he founded the temple and headquarters of Tendai at Enryaku-ji on Mount Hiei (near the capital of Kyoto), which became the center of Tendai practice and a major institution in the history of Japanese Buddhism.

Saichō emphasized the integration of the Tiantai teachings on meditation, study, precepts, and ritual practice, with the mantrayana practices of Chinese Esoteric Buddhism. He also worked to establish a new ordination system which was based on the bodhisattva precepts, rather than the traditional monastic rule (Vinaya) precepts.

Saichō's Tendai school laid the groundwork for the development of later Japanese Buddhist traditions, including Pure Land, and Zen Buddhism.

== Life ==
=== Early life ===
Saichō was born in the year 767 in the city of Ōmi, in present Shiga Prefecture, with the given name of Hirono. According to family tradition, Saichō's ancestors were descendants of emperors of Eastern Han China; however, no positive evidence exists for this claim. The region where Saichō was born did have a large Chinese immigrant population, so Saichō likely did have Chinese ancestry.

During Saichō's time, the Buddhist temples in Japan were officially organized into a national network known as the provincial temple system, and at the age of 13, Saichō became a disciple of one Gyōhyō (722–797, 行表). He took tonsure as a novice monk at the age of 14 and was given the ordination name "Saichō". Gyōhyō in turn was a disciple of Dao-xuan (702–760, 道璿, Dōsen in Japanese), a prominent monk from China of the Tiantai school who had brought the East Mountain Teaching of Chan Buddhism, Huayan teachings and the Bodhisattva Precepts of the Brahmajala Sutra to Japan in 736 and served as the "precept master" for ordination prior to the arrival of Jianzhen.

By the age of 20, he undertook the full monastic precepts at the Tōdai-ji, thus becoming a fully ordained monk in the official temple system. A few months later he abruptly retreated to Mount Hiei for an intensive study and practice of Buddhism, though the exact reason for his departure remains unknown. Shortly after his retreat, he composed his Ganmon (願文; "Saichō's Prayer") which included his personal vows to:

1. So long as I have not attained the stage where my six faculties are pure, I will not venture out into the world.
2. So long as I have not realized the absolute, I will not acquire any special skills or arts [e.g. medicine, divination, calligraphy, etc.].
3. So long as I have not kept all the precepts purely, I will not participate in any lay donor's Buddhist meetings.
4. So long as I have not attained wisdom (lit. hannya 般若), I will not participate in worldly affairs unless it be to benefit others.
5. May any merit from my practice in the past, present and future be given not to me, but to all sentient beings so that they may attain supreme enlightenment.

In time, Saichō attracted other monks both on Mount Hiei, and from the Buddhist community in Nara, and a monastic community developed on Mount Hiei, which eventually became Enryaku-ji. Saichō was said to have carved an image of the Bhaiṣajyaguru and enshrined it. Additionally, he lit a lamp of oil before the Buddha and prayed that the lamp would never be extinguished. This lamp is now known as the Fumetsu no Hōtō (不滅の法灯; "Inextinguishable Dharma Lamp") and has remained lit for 1200 years.

The capital of Japan was moved from Nara to Nagaoka-kyō in 784, and then to Kyoto in 795. Because Mount Hiei was coincidentally located to the northeast of Kyoto, a direction considered dangerous according to Chinese geomancy, Saichō's presence on the mountain was thought to protect the new capital and brought him to the attention of the court. Saichō and his community on Mount Hiei also started to correspond and exchange ceremonies with the established communities in Nara, in addition to the monks at the Court, further enhancing his prestige.

One of Saichō's earliest supporters in the Court was Wake no Hiroyo, who invited Saichō to give lectures at Takaosan-ji along with fourteen other eminent monks. Saichō was not the first to be invited, indicating that he was still relatively unknown in the Court, but rising in prominence.

=== Trip to China ===
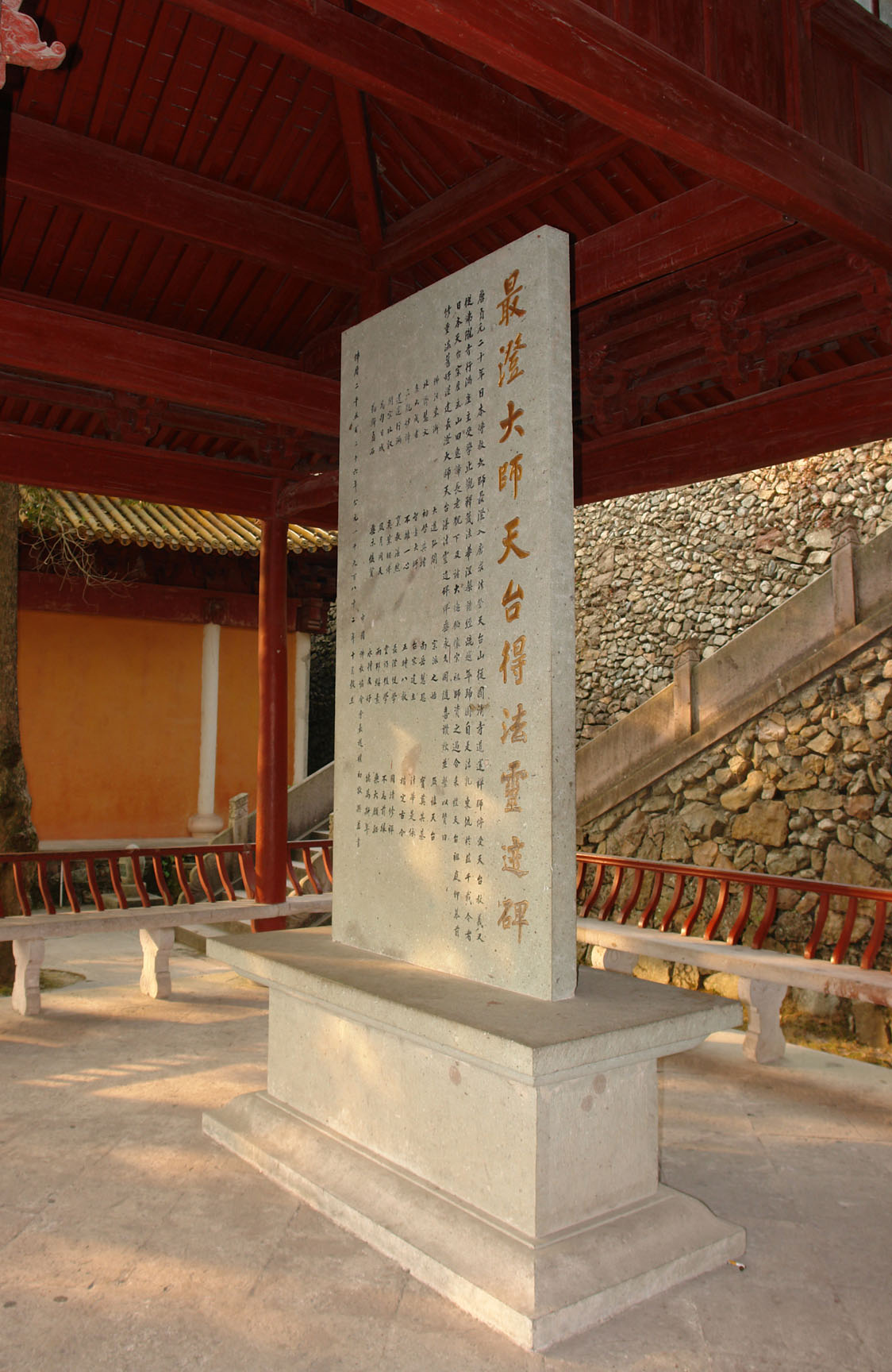
A stele commemorating the reception of the Tiantai Dharma by Master Saichō (located at Guoqing Temple on Mount Tiantai)

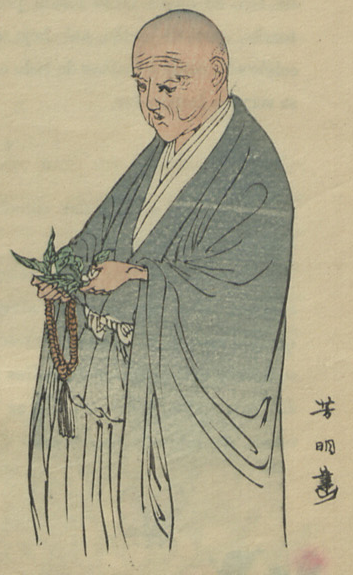
Saichō is known for having introduced tea to Japan

The success of the Takaosanji lectures, plus Saichō's association with Wake no Hiroyo soon caught the attention of Emperor Kanmu who consulted with Saichō about propagating his Buddhist teachings further, and to help bridge the traditional rivalry between the East Asian Yogācāra and East Asian Mādhyamaka schools.

The emperor granted a petition by Saichō to journey to China to further study Tiantai doctrine in China and bring back more texts. Saichō was expected to only remain in China for a short time however.

Saichō could read Chinese but was unable to speak it at all, thus he was allowed to bring a trusted disciple along named Gishin (義眞), who apparently could speak Chinese. Gishin would later become one of the head monks of the Tendai order after Saichō.

Saichō was part of the four-ship diplomatic mission to Tang China in 803. The ships were forced to turn back due to heavy winds, where they spent some time at Dazaifu, Fukuoka. During this time, Saichō likely met another passenger, Kūkai, a fellow Buddhist monk who was sent to China on a similar mission though he was expected to stay much longer.

When the ships set sail again, two sank during a heavy storm, but Saichō's ship arrived at the port of Ningbo, then known as Mingzhou (Chinese: 明州; pinyin: Míngzhōu), in northern Zhejiang in 804. Shortly after arrival, permission was granted for Saichō and his party to travel to Tiantai Mountain and he was introduced to the seventh Patriarch of Tiantai, Daosui (Chinese: 道邃; pinyin: Dàosuì), who became his primary teacher during his time in China. Daosui was instrumental in teaching Saichō about Tiantai methods of meditation, monastic discipline and orthodox teachings. Saichō remained under this instruction for approximately 135 days.

Saichō spent the next several months copying various Buddhist works with the intention of bringing them back to Japan with him. While some works existed in Japan already, Saichō felt that they suffered from copyist errors or other defects, and so he made fresh copies. Once the task was completed, Saichō and his party returned to Ningbo, but the ship was harbored in Fuzhou at the time, and would not return for six weeks.

During this time, Saichō went to Yuezhou (越州, modern-day Shaoxing) and sought out texts and information on Vajrayana (Esoteric) Buddhism. The Tiantai school originally only utilized "mixed" (zōmitsu (雑密)) ceremonial practices, but over time esoteric Buddhism took on a greater role. By the time Saichō had arrived in China, a number of Tiantai Buddhist centers provided esoteric training, and both Saichō and Gishin received initiation at a temple in Yue Prefecture. However, it's unclear what transmission or transmissions(s) they received. Some evidence suggests that Saichō did not receive the dual (ryōbu (兩部) transmissions of the Diamond Realm and the Womb Realm. Instead, it is thought he may have only received the Diamond Realm transmission, but the evidence is not conclusive one way or the other.

Finally, on the tenth day of the fifth month of 805, Saichō and his party returned to Ningbo and after compiling further bibliographies, boarded the ship back for Japan and arrived in Tsushima on the fifth day of the sixth month. Although Saichō had only stayed in China for a total of eight months, his return was eagerly awaited by the court in Kyoto.

=== Founding of Tendai ===
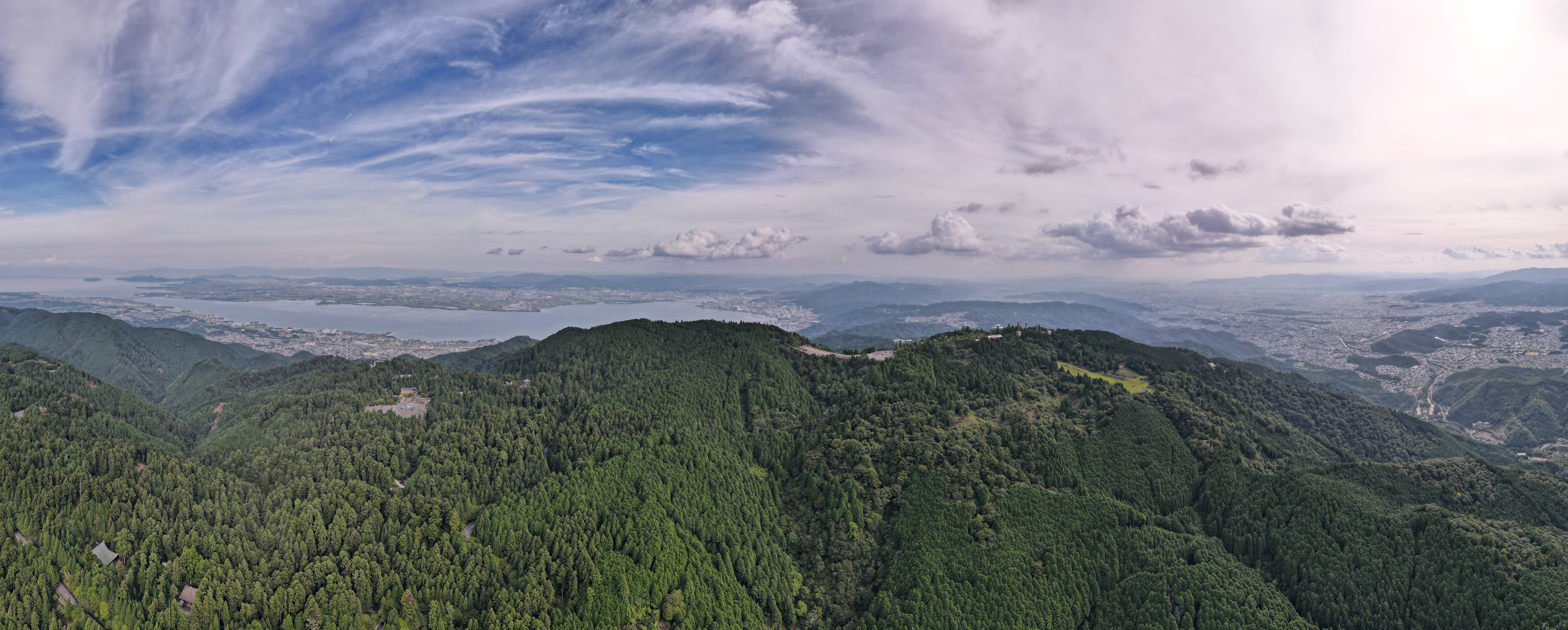
Panorama of Mount Hiei from the north

On his return from China, Saichō worked hard to win recognition from the court and "in the first month of 806, Saichō's Tendai Lotus school (Tendai-hokke-shū 天台法華宗) won official recognition when the court of the ailing emperor Kanmu issued another edict, this one permitting two annual ordinands (nenbundosha) for Saichō's new school on Mount Hiei (比叡山 Hieizan), a mountain to the northeast of Kyoto. This edict states that, following Saichō's request, the ordinands would be divided between two curricula: the shanagō course and the shikangō course. Shanagō was the Mikkyō curriculum grounded on the study of the Mahavairocana Sūtra ('shana' being the abbreviation for Birushana, the Japanese transliteration of Vairocana). The shikangō course was the Tendai exoteric curriculum based on the study of the Mohe Zhiguan, the seminal work of the Tiantai patriarch Zhiyi 智顗 (538–597) (shikan is the Japanese reading of zhiguan, i.e. cessation and contemplation).

Thus from its very inception the Tendai Lotus school was equally based on Mikkyō and Tiantai. It was as a subdivision of Saichō's new school that Mikkyō first received the official acknowledgment of the imperial court and became a proper subject of study in Japanese Buddhism.

In 813, Saichō wrote the Ehyō tendaishū (DZ 1, pp. 343–366), in which he argued that the leading Buddhist figures of China and Korea based their teachings on Tiantai doctrine when composing their own works. In citing many references to and quotations from Tiantai texts in the writings of notable figures such as Jizang (吉藏) of the Sanlun school, Zhi Zhou of the Faxiang school, Fazang of the Huayan school, Yi Xing of Mikkyō, and other influential scholars, Saichō contended that Tiantai provided the foundational framework for all Asian Buddhism.

Before Saichō, all monastic ordinations took place at Tōdai-ji temple under the ancient Vinaya code, but Saichō intended to found his school as a strictly Mahayana institution and ordain monks using the Bodhisattva Precepts only. Despite intense opposition from the traditional Buddhist schools in Nara, his request was granted by Emperor Saga in 822, several days after his death. This was the fruit of years of effort and a formal debate.

=== Relationship with Kūkai ===
Saichō journeyed to China accompanied by several other young monks, one of whom was Kūkai (774–835). During their time in China, Saichō developed a friendship with Kūkai, and they traveled together both to and from China. This relationship would play a significant role in shaping the future of Buddhism. In the final month of his stay in China, while waiting for his ship to arrive at the port city of Ming-chou, Saichō traveled to Yüeh-chou to gather additional Buddhist scriptures. At Lung-hsing ssu (龍興寺), he encountered the priest Shun-hsiao, with whom he later returned bearing esoteric (tantric) Buddhist texts. Saichō was captivated by these new teachings and became eager to explore them further. Upon returning, he discovered that Kūkai had already deeply studied these teachings and had amassed a large collection of Vajrayana texts. This bond would later influence the course of Tendai Buddhism.

Saichō and Kūkai are widely regarded as the founders of the Japanese Tendai and Shingon schools, respectively, both of which became significant and enduring institutions. The two collaborated to introduce esoteric Buddhism (mikkyō) to Japan's cultural context. For instance, Saichō helped facilitate Kūkai's later performance of the Mikkyō initiation ritual (abhiṣeka, kanjō 灌頂) for the high priests of the Nara Buddhist establishment and the imperial dignitaries at the Heian court, even though Kūkai remained relatively unknown upon his return from Tang China.

Saichō himself conducted an abhiṣeka (esoteric ritual consecration) for the court. Additionally, he supported the imperial donation of the mountain temple of Takaosan-ji, located northwest of Kyoto, to Kūkai as the first center for Shingon Buddhism. In turn, Kūkai responded to Saichō’s desire to integrate Mikkyō into Tendai by instructing Saichō and his disciples in esoteric Buddhist rituals and by providing them with various Mikkyō texts he had brought from China.

=== Last days ===
By 822, Saichō petitioned the court to allow the monks at Mount Hiei to ordain under the Bodhisattva Precepts of the Brahma Net Sūtra, rather than the traditional ordination system of the prātimokṣa, arguing that his community would be a purely Mahayana, not Hinayana one. This was met with strong protest by the Buddhist establishment who supported the kokubunji system, and lodged a protest. Saichō composed the Kenkairon (顕戒論; "A Clarification of the Precepts"), which stressed the significance of the Bodhisattva Precepts, but his request was still rejected until 7 days after his death at the age of 56.

In the last years of his life, Saichō focused on consolidating the position of the Tendai school within Japanese Buddhism as an independent tradition. Saichō’s writings articulated his vision for a unified approach to Buddhist practice that transcended sectarian dividions in favor of a universalist understanding of Mahayana Buddhism based on the teaching of the One Vehicle (Ekayāna), which held that all the Buddha's teachings were true, seeing them all as skillful means.

== Teaching ==
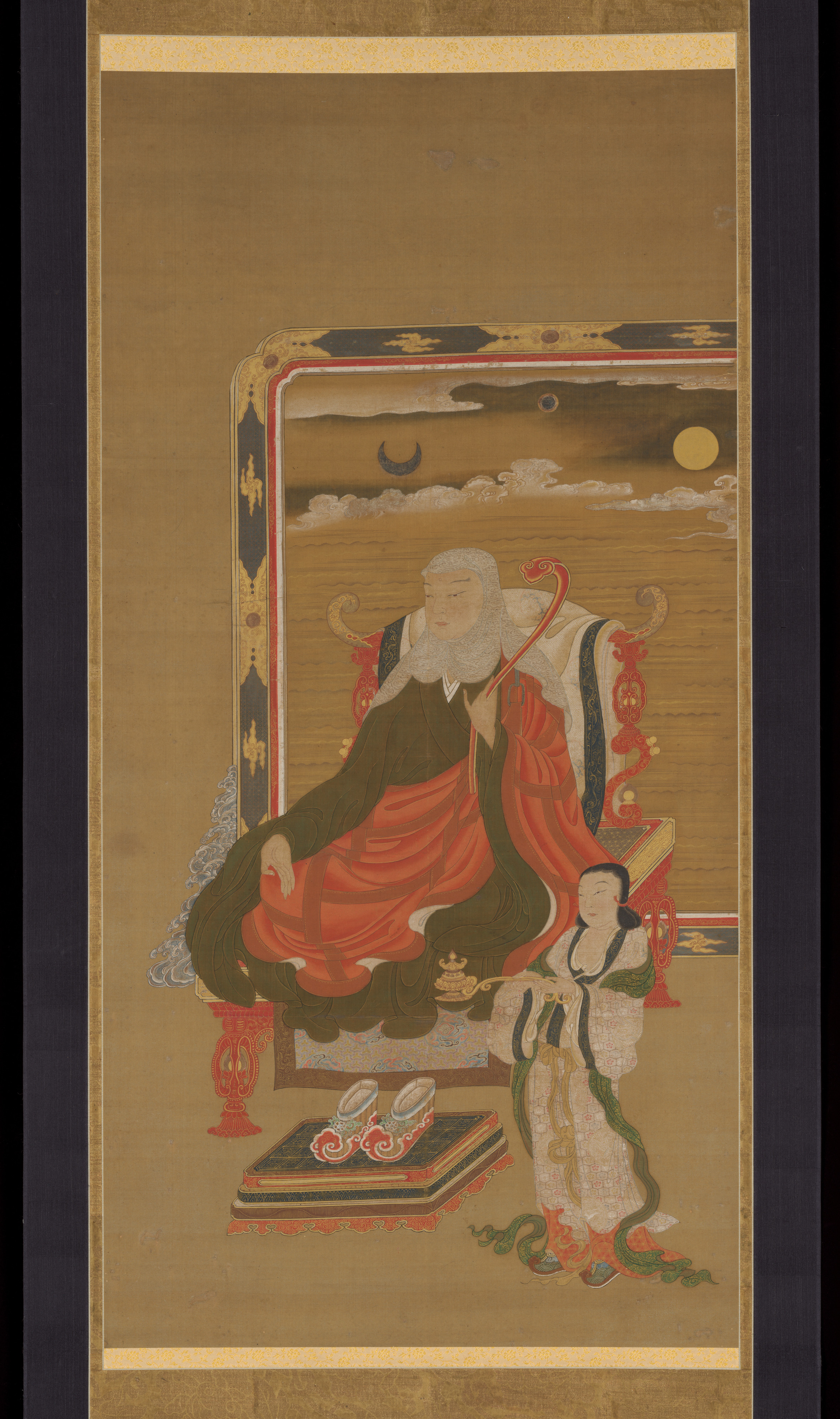
Portrait of Dengyō Daishi (Saichō) at the MET

=== Integration of the Perfect and Esoteric teachings ===
Saichō played a pivotal role in shaping the doctrinal and institutional framework of Japanese Buddhism, especially through his synthesis of the teachings of the Chinese Tiantai school and Chinese Esoteric Buddhism. This integration led to the establishment of a distinct form of Japanese Tendai that incorporated Esoteric practices (Taimitsu) while maintaining the central focus on the Lotus Sutra and the teachings of Zhiyi.

Chinese Tiantai in the sixth century during the Sui dynasty, was characterized by its comprehensive approach to Buddhist teachings, which integrated both exoteric (public) and esoteric (secret) elements. When Saichō encountered this tradition in China during his studies from 804 to 805, he inherited its syncretic nature, which emphasized the unity of various Buddhist teachings. Saichō’s synthesis was influenced not only by the teachings of Tiantai but also by Esoteric Buddhism, which was gaining prominence in China at the time. Saichō's synthetic teaching came to be called "enmitsuzenkai": the union of the Perfect (En, i.e. Tiantai teachings), Esoteric (Mitsu), Meditation (Zen), and Precepts (Kai).

In Japan, Saichō’s teachings diverged from the approaches of earlier Nara Buddhism, which largely adhered to exoteric doctrines. Saichō’s core innovation was his belief in the unity of the Lotus Sutra and Esoteric Buddhism, encapsulated in the term enmitsu itchi (円密一致), or "the identity of the meaning of Perfect and Esoteric teachings."

This system integrates the study and practice of key Mahayana practices based on Zhiyi's Mohe Zhiguan (Jp: Makashikan), including shikan (śamatha-vipaśyanā) meditation, Lotus Repentance rites, the Four Samadhis and the Threefold Contemplation along with a parallel study track focusing on Mikkyō (esoteric practices like mantra and deity yoga). It is for this reason that the formal Tendai educational curriculum came to include two tracks which were studied by ordinands:

- Shikan-gō (止觀業): Focuses on Mahayana practices taught in Zhiyi's Mohezhiguan, and related texts.
- Shana-gō (遮那業): Focuses on esoteric practices based on the Mahāvairocana-sūtra, and other esoteric scriptures.

Saichō, in his Kanjō Tendai-shū Nenbun Gakushō-shiki (Regulations for Tendai School Annual Ordinands), emphasized the practice of the Four Samādhis (四種三昧, shishu zanmai), as described in Zhiyi's Mohe Zhiguan. He sought to establish a Four Samādhis Hall as a place for this practice.

Saichō argued that both the Lotus Sutra, which emphasizes universal salvation, and Esoteric Buddhism, with its focus on secret practices for enlightenment, ultimately pointed to the same spiritual truth. This stance distinguished Saichō from other Buddhist schools of the time, including the Shingon school, which prioritized Esoteric practice as superior to exoteric sutras.

Saichō, in a letter to Kukai, wrote:

But the Vairocana school (shanashu 遮那宗) and Tendai interfuse with one another. They also share the same commentary.... There should be no such thing as preferring one to the other. The Lotus and the Golden Light are those texts to which the previous emperor [Kanmu] devoted himself, and there exists no difference between the One Unifying Vehicle [of Tendai] and Shingon.

For Saichō, the practices of Esoteric Buddhism did not replace the teachings of the Lotus Sutra but complemented them, providing a direct means (jikidō) to attain Buddhahood in this very life (sokushin-jōbutsu). This direct path contrasted with the more gradual approaches found in the Nara Buddhist schools, which Saichō believed took eons to lead to enlightenment.

In the early years of the 9th century, Saichō returned to Japan and began to establish the Tendai school on Mount Hiei. He founded a new ordination system that allowed for the reception of the Bodhisattva precepts, which permitted one to become a bhikkhu, or monk, within the framework of the Mahāyāna tradition. This marked the formation of the Japanese "Mahāyāna ordination platform" (dai jō kaidan), which was distinct from the Vinaya traditions of the Nara schools.

However, Saichō faced significant challenges. During his years of study, many of his early disciples left Mount Hiei, either defecting to the Hosso school or studying Esoteric Buddhism with Kūkai. Despite these challenges, Saichō continued to promote the integration of Esoteric practices within the Tendai system. He envisioned the practice of both exoteric (Lotus Sutra) and esoteric teachings as fundamental to the path of enlightenment. Yet, over time, Saichō began to realize that his vision of enmitsu itchi was not fully shared by Kūkai, particularly regarding the esoteric precepts and the nature of transmission.

The relationship between Saichō and Kūkai eventually began to deteriorate due to differing interpretations of Esoteric practice and the role of secret teachings. Saichō’s commitment to maintaining the open study of Esoteric texts and his disagreements with Kūkai's exclusive and secretive approach to Esoteric Buddhism led to a public split. The split between Saichō and Kūkai had a lasting impact on the development of both Tendai and Shingon Buddhism in Japan.

=== Buddha-nature ===
A central tenet of Saichō's Tendai teaching was the idea that "all sentient beings have Buddha-nature" (一切衆生悉有仏性, issai shujō shitsu u busshō), which expresses a key teaching of the Lotus and Nirvana Sutras which sees all beings as having the universal potential to become Buddhas. While previous Nara schools, including the Hossō school, acknowledged this to some extent, Saichō and the Hossō school engaged in intense debates over their interpretation of buddha-nature. This was most famously discussed in Saichō's debate with Yogacara scholar Tokuitsu.

Tokuitsu, while acknowledging universal Buddhahood, supported the theory of the five natures (or lineages), which posits that some beings (especially the icchantikas) lack the capacity to manifest buddha-nature through practice due to their "gotra" (lineage), a key theory found in Yogacara treatises. Saichō criticized this position as containing elements of Hinayana and asserted that all beings can attain Buddhahood as taught in the Lotus Sutra. He further rejected the common Buddhist view that only exceptional beings like Shakyamuni could attain Buddhahood through their heroic bodhisattva practices and instead emphasized that "those who believe in the Buddha-nature of all beings, engage in altruistic practices, and advance on the path to Buddhahood are true Bodhisattvas".

Saichō's view went further than this soteriological universalism, since he relied closely on Zhanran's view of Buddha nature as an all-pervasive reality that also includes insentient things (like mountains, rivers etc). Building on Zhanran's thought, Saichō incorporated the idea that insentient things inherently possess Buddha-nature. Zhanran's Tiantai doctrine proposed that the distinction between sentient and insentient beings is ultimately illusory, as all phenomena are included in ultimate reality, the realm of suchness (Tathātā). According to Zhanran, Buddha-nature pervades all things through the principle of mutual inclusion, in which each dharma realm contains all others. This perspective extends the nature of enlightenment to include inanimate objects by affirming that insentient things possess the threefold Buddha-nature. Saichō drew from this framework to reinforce his view that the dynamic expression of suchness actively manifests in the phenomenal world, further aligning his thought with the Tiantai doctrines of the middle and the One Vehicle.

Saichō's understanding of Buddha-nature also reflects influences from Huayan Buddhism, particularly the thought of Fazang and possibly Saichō's first Japanese teacher Gyōhyō 行表 (722–797). Huayan doctrine had begun to be influential on continental Tiantai during this time (as can be seen in Saichō's teacher Daosui). Saichō had also studied Huayan in Japan before his trip to China. Central to Saichō's view is the belief that suchness, as a universal reality, possesses both a static and a dynamic aspect (as taught in the Awakening of Faith and in Fazang's commentary). Saichō linked the dynamic expression of suchness, referred to as "active buddha-nature" (gyō-busshō), to the phenomenal world. This view emphasizes that all beings have the potential to realize Buddhahood, a perspective that integrates Tiantai notions of non-dual mutual inclusion with Huayan ideas of nature-origination (which sees buddha-nature as a basis for all reality). Saichō's emphasis on the universality of suchness allowed him to extend the concept of Buddha-nature beyond all sentient beings to include the entire phenomenal world.

This doctrine is also referred to as "Suchness according with conditions" (shinnyo zuien 真如随縁) and can also be found in Zhanran's Diamond Scalpel.

Lopez and Stone describe Saichō's Huayan (J. Kegon) influenced view of Buddha-nature as follows:

Saichō, the Japanese Tendai founder, countered in part by drawing on Huayan (J. Kegon) thinkers to argue that suchness has not only a quiescent aspect as universal principle (fuhen shinnyo), but also a dynamic aspect that manifests itself as the concrete forms of the phenomenal world (zuien shinnyo). He also maintained that suchness has the nature of realizing and knowing. Thus, there was no need to postulate seeds in the store consciousness of only certain individuals as the cause of buddhahood. Saichō equated suchness in its dynamic aspect with active buddha nature, and because suchness is universal, everyone has the potential to realize buddhahood.

By integrating these insights, Saichō developed a unique perspective on Buddha-nature that elevated the empirical world as a vital sphere of enlightenment, in which, as the Huayan sutra states, “countless realms preach the dharma. The land preaches the dharma. And living beings preach the dharma.” Saichō teachings on buddha-nature contributed to the distinctive character of Japanese Tendai thought, becoming especially important in medieval Tendai original enlightenment theory. This current had a significant impact on later Japanese Buddhism.

=== Bodhisattva precepts and new ordination system ===
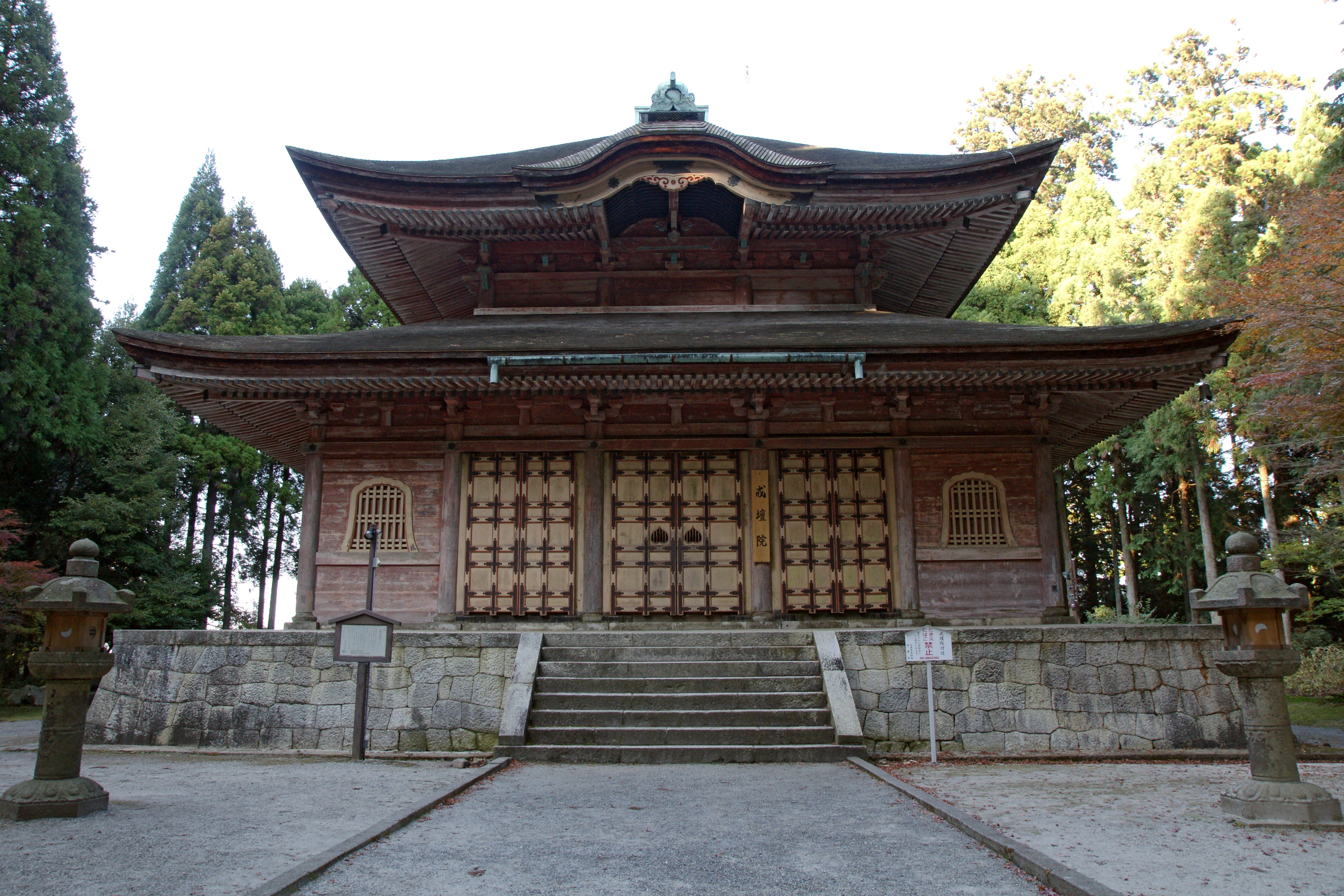
The Ordination Platform (kaidan) at Enryaku-ji

Saichō initiated a significant reform of Buddhist monastic ordination by advocating for the sole use of Mahāyāna bodhisattva precepts in place of the traditional Hīnayāna vinaya precepts. This reform was central to his vision of establishing a purely Mahāyāna tradition in Japan, distinct from the Nara schools that relied on the Dharmaguptaka vinaya. Saichō’s reforms were deeply influenced by the Brahma Net Sutra (Fanwang jing), and the *Lotus Sutra*, which became foundational to Tendai interpretations of the precepts.

The Brahma Net Sutra provided a set of ten major and forty-eight minor bodhisattva precepts, which Saichō adopted as the basis for ordination. However, the Lotus Sutra also played a crucial role in shaping Tendai views on the precepts. While the Lotus Sutra does not explicitly outline precepts in the form of rules, its teachings were interpreted by Tendai monks to support a wide range of positions on monastic discipline, from strict adherence to the vinaya to the complete transcendence of formal precepts.

Saichō’s choice to set aside the vinaya precepts was rooted in his interpretation of the Lotus Sutra as the ultimate expression of the Buddha's teachings. In his early biography, the Eizan Daishi den, Saichō is quoted as vowing to non longer follow the 250 Hīnayāna precepts, since they are mainly for śrāvakas. Instead, he emphasized the bodhisattva path as articulated in the Lotus Sutra, which he believed revealed the true intent of the Buddha's teachings. This perspective was further supported by passages in the Lotus Sutra, such as the “Comfortable Practices” (anrakugyō) chapter, which admonishes practitioners to avoid association with śrāvakas.

Saichō’s reforms laid the groundwork for the development of the “Perfect-Sudden Precepts” (endonkai), a concept that became central to Tendai monasticism. These precepts were understood as being rooted in the Lotus Sutra and were seen as encompassing both the form and spirit of Mahāyāna practice. The Perfect-Sudden Precepts were interpreted as expressions of the inherent Buddha-nature within all beings. This view allowed for a more flexible approach to monastic discipline, emphasizing the intention behind actions rather than strict adherence to formal precepts.

One of Saichō’s most significant achievements was his successful petition to establish a Mahāyāna precept platform (kaidan) on Mount Hiei. This platform was intended to serve as the site for conferring the bodhisattva precepts on Tendai monks, thereby creating a distinct ordination lineage. The establishment of the platform was a direct challenge to the Nara schools, which controlled the traditional vinaya ordination platforms. Despite strong opposition, Saichō’s efforts were posthumously approved by the imperial court in 822, and the platform was constructed in 827. The Mahāyāna precept platform allowed for the ordination of monks solely based on bodhisattva precepts. Later Japanese Buddhist schools, including Zen and Pure Land, eventually adopted similar ordination practices.

Saichō’s new model of monastic ordination became the standard for Buddhist ordination in many schools of Japanese Buddhism that developed out of Tendai, including Jōdo-shū, Rinzai and Sōtō Zen. Over time, the bodhisattva precepts were adapted and reinterpreted, leading to a more flexible approach to monastic discipline that allowed for the integration of lay practitioners and the eventual acceptance of married clergy. Even the schools which promoted the keeping of Vinaya precepts, like the Risshū school, or the schools which did not make use of bodhisattva precepts at all, like Jōdo Shinshū, cited Saichō's writings on the precepts, if only to defend themselves and explain why they did not agree with it.

== Works ==
Saichō wrote a number of texts which are important for the Tendai tradition. Some of his key writings include:

- The Treatise on Clarifying the Precepts (Kenkairon, 顕戒論)
- Tract on the Defense of the Nation (Shugo Kokkai Shō, 守護國界章)
- The Regulations for the Students of the Mountain School (Sange Gakushō Shiki, 山家學生式 )
- The Verses on the Transmission of the Dharma in the Tendai Lotus School (Tendai Hokkeshū Denpō Ge, 天台法華宗傳法偈)
- The Great Import of the Twenty Eight Chapters of the Dharma Flower [Sūtra] (Hokke Nijuhappin Dai-I, 法華二十八品大意)
- The Mirror which Reflects the Provisional and Real (Shōgon Jikkyō, 照權實鏡)
- Treatise on the Dharma-realm and the Essence of Mind (Hōkai Shintai Ron, 法界心體論)
- Collection on the Reliances of the Tendai School (Ehyō Tendaishū, 依憑天台集)
- Questions and Answers on the Regulations for the Students of the Tendai Lotus School (Tendai Hokkeshū Gakushō Shiki Mondo, 天台法華宗學生式問答)
- The Extraordinary Passages of the Lotus Sūtra (Hokke Shūku, 法華秀句)

== See also ==
- Tendai
- Annen (monk)
- Ennin
