= Jingxi, Minhou County =

Jingxi 荆溪镇
- Town
- Location in Fujian Jingxi (China)
- Coordinates: 26°07′46″N 119°10′33″E
- Country: People's Republic of China
- Province: Fujian
- Prefecture-level city: Fuzhou
- County: Minhou County
- Time zone: UTC+8 (China Standard)

Jingxi (Chinese: 荆溪; pinyin: Jīngxī) is a town in Minhou County, Fujian province, China. As of 2020, it has six residential neighborhoods and 13 villages under its administration:

Neighborhoods

- Jingxi Community
- Houyu Community (厚屿社区)
- Gushanzhou Community (古山洲社区)
- Yongfeng Community (永丰社区)
- Dajia Community (大佳社区)
- Fugu Community (福鼓社区)

Villages

- Heyang Village (荷洋村)
- Renzhou Village (仁洲村)
- Liudun Village (六墩村)
- Guanzhong Village (关中村)
- Guanxi Village (关西村)
- Puqian Village (埔前村)
- Guandong Village (关东村)
- Guankou Village (关口村)
- Xixia Village (溪下村)
- Gangtou Village (港头村)
- Guangming Village (光明村)
- Tongkou Village (桐口村)
- Taotian Village (桃田村)

== See also ==
- List of township-level divisions of Fujian
