= Jingxi, Wanyuan =

Jingxi 井溪镇
- Town
- Location in Sichuan
- Coordinates: 31°46′02″N 108°14′07″E
- Country: People's Republic of China
- Province: Sichuan
- Prefecture-level city: Dazhou
- County-level city: Wanyuan
- Time zone: UTC+8 (China Standard)

Jingxi (Chinese: 井溪; pinyin: Jǐngxī) is a town under the administration of Wanyuan in eastern Sichuan, China. As of 2020, it administers Yanyuan Community (盐源社区) and the following eight villages:

- Yanjingba Village (盐井坝村)
- Luoxuantang Village (落漩塘村)
- Xinchang Village (新场村)
- Maoping Village (猫坪村)
- Xiangshuidong Village (响水洞村)
- Huangshacao Village (黄沙槽村)
- Longwangba Village (龙王坝村)
- Kengtang Village (坑塘村)
