= Jingxi Subdistrict, Nanchong =

Jingxi Subdistrict 荆溪街道
- Subdistrict
- Location in Sichuan
- Coordinates: 30°51′31″N 106°06′45″E
- Country: People's Republic of China
- Province: Sichuan
- Prefecture-level city: Nanchong
- District: Shunqing District
- Time zone: UTC+8 (China Standard)

Jingxi Subdistrict (Chinese: 荆溪街道; pinyin: Jīngxī Jiēdào) is a subdistrict in Shunqing District, Nanchong, Sichuan province, China. As of 2020, it administers the following seven residential neighborhoods and three villages:

Neighborhoods

- Huachang Community (花厂社区)
- Sangzhou Community (桑洲社区)
- Xincheng Community (新城社区)
- Jingyuan Community (荆苑社区)
- Guanyinci Community (观音慈社区)
- Wenchanggong Community (文昌宫社区)
- Wenyuan Community (文苑社区)

Villages

- Tanguanyao Village (坛罐窖村)
- Maoshuiyan Village (冒水堰村)
- Xiexing Village (协兴村)

== See also ==
- List of township-level divisions of Sichuan
