= Zhanran =

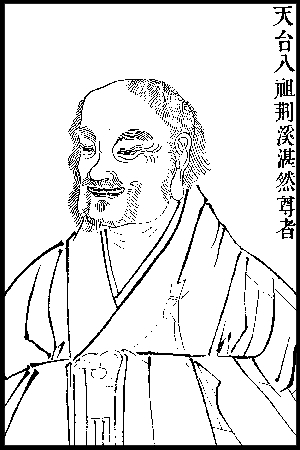
Zhanran

Jingxi Zhanran (Chinese: 荆溪湛然; pinyin: Zhànrán; Wade–Giles: Chan-jan; J. Keikei Tannen; K. Hyŏnggye Tamyŏn, c. 711-782) was the sixth patriarch of the Tiantai school of Chinese Buddhism. Zhanran is considered to be the most important Tiantai figure after the founder Zhiyi. He was also called Master Miaole (Sublime Bliss), Dharma Master Jizhu (Lord of Exegesis), and Jingqi (荊溪) after his birthplace.

Zhanran helped define, defend, and popularize the Tiantai tradition during the Tang dynasty, further developing its doctrinal system based on Zhiyi's writings. He authored important commentaries on Zhiyi's works as well as original treatises of his own. He is also the first figure to use the term "Tiantai School" (Tiantai zong).

== Life ==
Zhanran was born in Jingqi (荊溪), in modern-day Yixing 宜興 county, Jiangsu province. His lay surname was Qi (戚). After receiving a Ruist (Confucian) education, Zhanran became attracted to the study of Tiantai Buddhism at the age of eighteen. He later became a student of Master Xuanlang (673–754), the past head of the Tiantai community on Mt. Tiantai who had now retired to Mount Zuoxi (Zhejiang province). Zhanran stayed with Xuanlang on Mount Zuoxi as a lay practitioner and lecturer for twenty years, studying and practicing Zhiyi's Mohe zhiguan.

Zhanran later entered the monastic order at thirty eight in Jingle si (淨樂寺) at Junshan (君山). Early in his monastic training, he studied the Vinaya with precept master Tanyi (曇一, 692-771) at Huiji (會稽). After this period, Zhanran traveled around for a bit, looking for shelter during the An Lushan Rebellion (755–763). In 755, while staying in Lin’an (臨安; Zhejiang province), he wrote the first draft of his magnum opus, the Zhiguan fuxing chuanhong jue (止觀輔行傳弘決; A Resolution to Assist and Promote the Practice of “Concentration and Insight,” T. 1912). This is his main commentary on Zhiyi's Mohe Zhiguan. He later moved back to Mount Tiantai in 764. It was during this tumultuous time that Zhanran wrote the first editions of many of his commentaries.

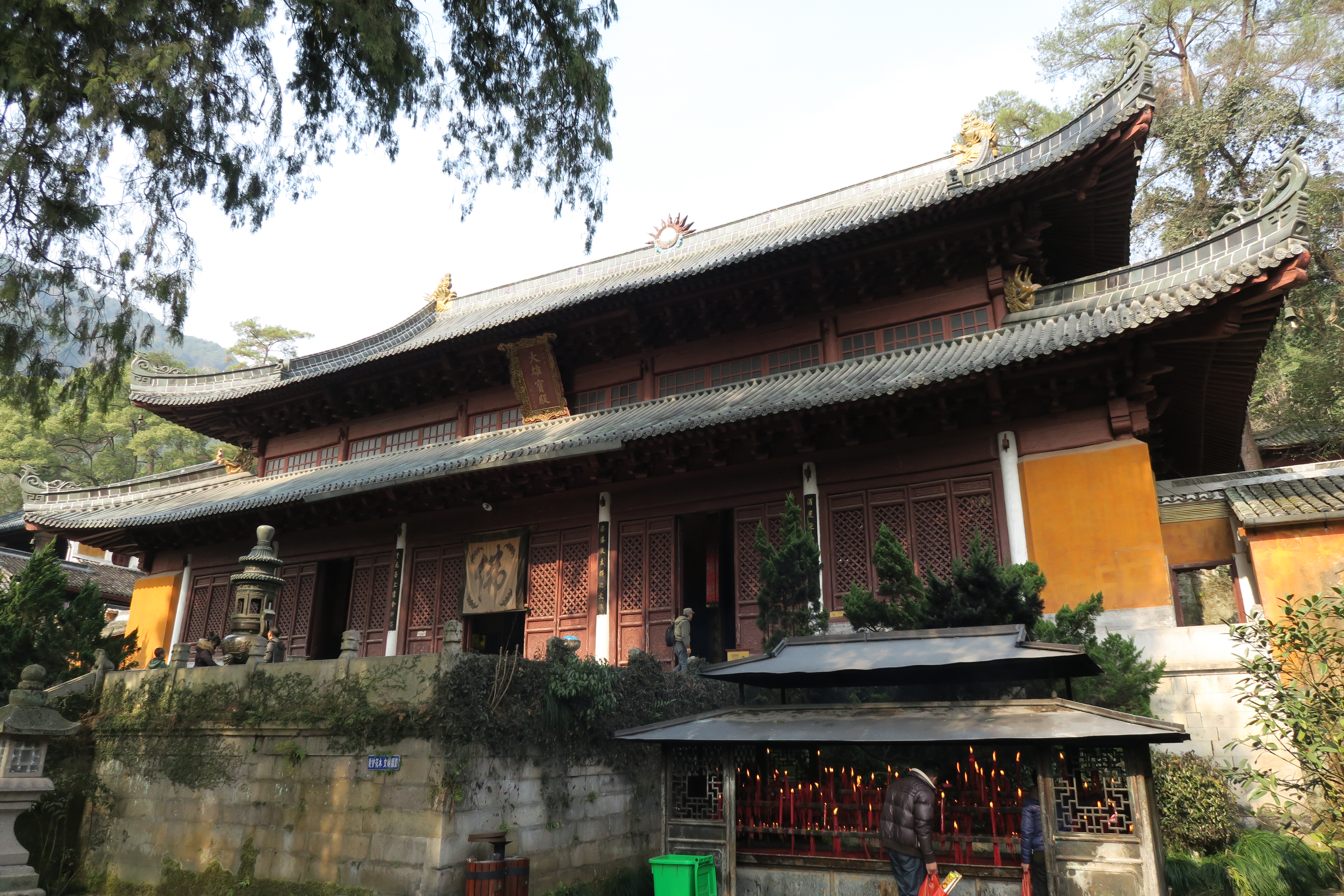
Guoqing Temple

Zhanran worked to revive and unify the various temples of the tradition under the banner of one school, the "Tiantai school" (Tiantai zong). Before the rise of Zhanran, the Tang Tiantai tradition had begun to be challenged by other traditions, like Huayan, Esoteric Buddhism and Chan (Zen) and some Tiantai monasteries like those on Mt. Wutai had begun to draw on these traditions as well. Zhanran's writings are in part a response to this challenge, and a reassertion of the preeminence of Zhiyi's teachings, as well as an effort to construct a sense of a Tiantai zong (宗, school).

Zhanran spent much time and energy writing commentaries on the works of Zhiyi, and defending Tiantai doctrines against the competing East Asian Yogācāra, Chan, and Huayan schools, who he also studied deeply. For example, Zhanran's commentaries on the Lotus Sutra specifically address and refute the interpretations of Faxiang scholar Kuiji, which grant the Lotus Sutra a status lower to Yogācāra scriptures which teach the theory of icchantika. Zhanran's writings on the distinctions between Tiantai and these others schools became central to later Tiantai Buddhism's sense of identity.

In the 770s, Zhanran traveled widely and taught at various places throughout China, including Suzhou (蘇州), Mount Wutai and Kaiyuan si (開元寺) in Suzhou. He was even invited by Chinese emperors Xuanzong (r. 712–756), Suzong (r. 756–762), and Daizong (r. 762–779) to lecture at the imperial court, but he declined, citing illness as an excuse. Scholars disagree on the reasons why he might have stayed away from court. He may have wanted to avoid politics and favored personal connections with his disciples, or he may have been worried that the emperors were more supportive of Daoism and Esoteric Buddhism.

Later in life, he retired to Guoqing temple on Mt. Tiantai. He died at Folong in 782. With time, Zhanran's influence grew and his works became authoritative in the Tiantai school as he was later considered to be the 9th patriarch of the Tiantai tradition and a Dharma heir (fazi 法子) of Xuanlang. However, his status during his lifetime is less clear, and he likely did not gain such prestige officially during his lifetime.

== Works ==
There are at least 33 works attributed to Zhan-ran, though only 21 are extant, and eleven of them have been questioned by modern scholars as being later works.

Zhanran's three main works are all large influential commentaries on the works of Zhiyi:

- Zhiguan fuxing zhuan hongjue (止觀輔行傳弘決, T1912), a commentary on the Mohe Zhiguan (摩訶止觀, The Great Calming and Contemplation, T1911).
- Fahua Xuanyi Shiqian (法華玄義釋籤, T1717), a sub-commentary on Fahua Xuanyi (法華玄義, The Profound Meaning of The Lotus Sutra, T1716), Zhiyi's commentary to the Lotus Sutra.
- Fahua Wenju Ji (法華文句記, T1719), a sub-commentary on Fahua Wenju (法華文句, The Words and Phrases of The Lotus Sutra, T1718), Zhiyi's other commentary to the Lotus Sutra.

He also wrote several other shorter digests of his commentary on the Mohe Zhiguan. These smaller works are the Zhiguan yili (止觀義例, T. 1913) which critiques Chan meditation, the Zhiguan fuxing suyao ji (止觀 輔行捜要記, X. 919), and the Zhiguan dayi (止觀大 意, T. 1914).

Zhanran also wrote two sub-commentaries to Zhiyi's Vimalakirti Sutra commentaries.

Zhanran also wrote some original works, such as the influential Adamantine Scalpel Treatise (Jin’gangpi Lun 金剛錍論, T. 1932), which discusses how Buddha-nature, being all-pervasive and non-dual, is also found in inanimate things like mountains and rocks. This was perhaps his most influential work, on which around sixty commentaries have been written since.

His other independent treatise is the Beginning and the End of the Mind Essence (Shizhong xinyao 始終心要), a small text which is a concise encapsulation of the heart (xin 心) of Tiantai thought.

== Teaching ==
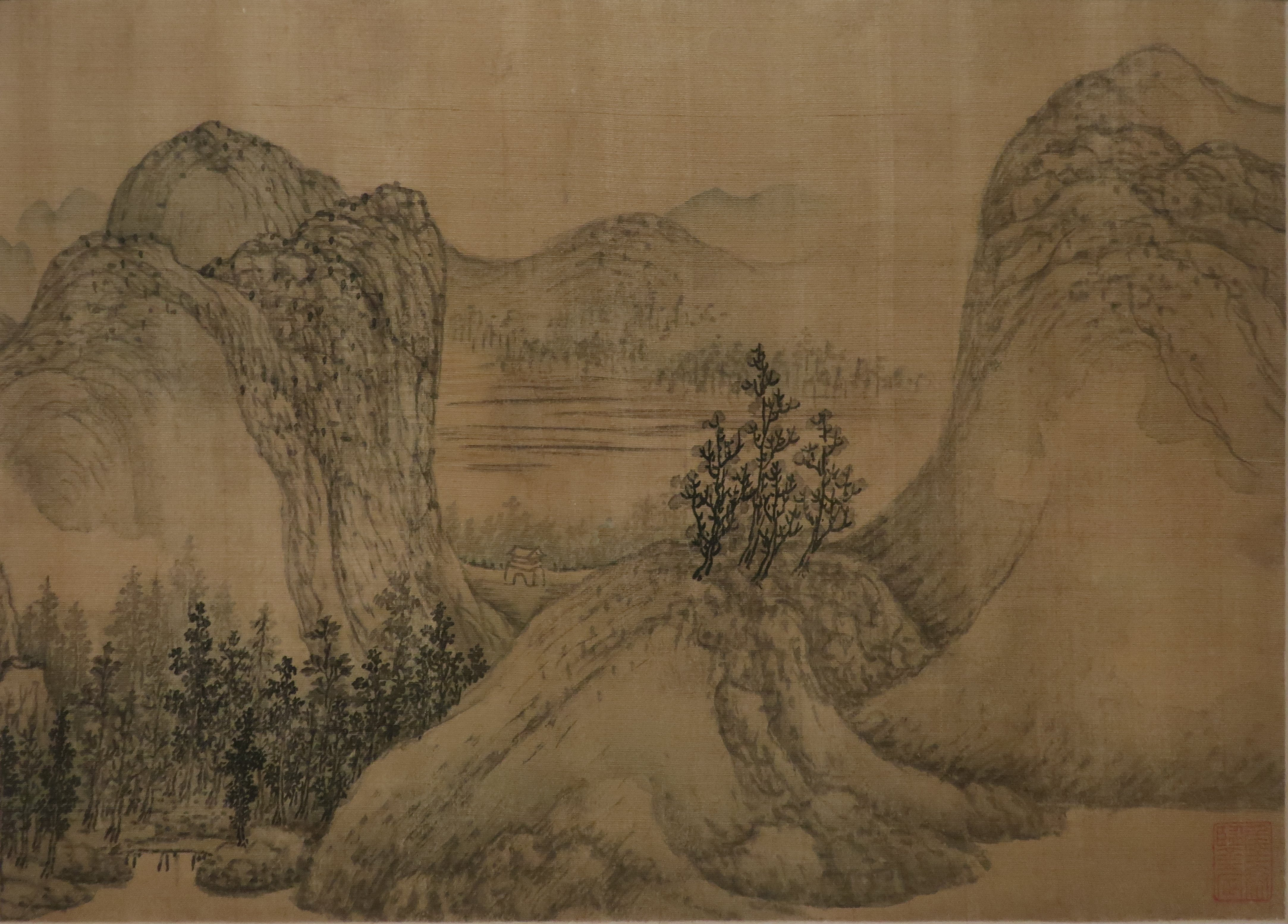
Mount Tiantai by Wu Bin (1605, Honolulu Museum of Art). According to Zhanran, buddha-nature pervades all insentient reality, including mountains.

Zhanran is best known for his scriptural exegesis of Zhiyi's Tiantai teaching, as well as his promotion of the influential doctrine of universal Buddha-nature, which is said to fully pervade (bian 念) insentient as well as sentient beings. This teaching is called "the Buddha-nature of Insentient Beings" (wujing youxing 無情有性) and after Zhanran it became one of the key distinctive teachings of the Tiantai tradition. Through the influence of Saicho and the Japanese Tendai school, this doctrine also infused all of Japanese Buddhism.

Zhanran's contribution also includes the systematic doctrinal classification schema known as the Five Periods and Eight Teachings (五時八教). While this system has traditionally been attributed to Zhiyi, modern scholars like Sekiguchi Shindai have shown that the full system was developed by Zhanran, who first used the term in his Zhiguan fuxing chuanhong jue (T. 1912 [XLVI] p. 292a20).

=== Buddha-nature ===
Zhanran's Adamantine Scalpel Treatise (金剛錍 Jin'gang Pi) is the key source for the Tiantai doctrine of "the Buddha-nature of Insentient Beings". While the idea that “grass and trees too have buddha-nature” (caomu yiyou foxing 草木亦有佛性) had been mentioned in the works of Jizang and also relies on the thought of Jingying Huiyuan, it is Zhanran who provides the most famous exposition of this Chinese Buddhist doctrine which argues that all insentient things like water, buildings, flora, sounds, smells, rocks all have buddha-nature. According to Zhanran:

Every blade of grass, tree, pebble, and particle of dust is perfectly endowed with buddha-nature ...The practitioner of the perfect teaching, from beginning to end, knows that ultimate principle is non-dual and that there are no objects apart from mind. Who then is sentient? What then is insentient? Within the assembly of the Lotus, there is no discrimination.

Zhanran's understanding of buddha-nature relies on the classic Tiantai view of threefold buddha nature (三因佛性) which means that buddha-nature can be understood as having three aspects:

1. Buddha-Nature as the Proper Cause (正因佛性), the inner potential for Buddhahood in all and the true nature of reality itself
2. Buddha-Nature as the Revealing Cause (了因佛性), the wisdom of Buddhahood, the wisdom that leads to Buddhahood
3. Buddha-Nature as the Conditioning Cause (緣因佛性), the practices leading to Buddhahood and the activities of Buddhahood

Thus, when Zhanran says all things have buddha-nature, he means it in this threefold sense, which is always present in this triple way. That is to say, one never has just one of these aspects, when one is present, the others are present. Furthermore, this triple buddha-nature is non-dual with suffering, delusion and karma. From the perspective of deluded beings, there is just suffering, delusion and karma. But from the Buddha's point of view, suffering includes the potential for Buddhahood (proper cause), which is known by wisdom (revealing cause) and acted upon (conditioning cause). As such, Zhanran's summarizes his doctrine of Buddha-nature with the following statement:

From the beginningless past, you have had nothing but afflictions, karma, and suffering. Precisely this is entirely the Three Causes (of Buddhahood, i.e., the Threefold Buddha-nature) as Principle and as the Nature.

Zhanran's view of buddha-nature is not the same as that commonly found in Chan/Zen, which sees it as an "enlightened essence" or "pure Mind" which exists unblemished by the defilements. He also does not see it as some pure ground of all reality from which everything arises. Indeed, he rejects any view of buddha-nature that sees it as some inner core, transcendent mind or pure substratum. Instead, he sees buddha-nature as that which pervades all things and is non-dual with all things (pure or impure, samsaric or nirvanic), writing in the Diamond Scalpel that "this nature is neither internal [nor] external, [but] pervades-all [like] empty space; it is the same as all the Buddhas, and equal to the Dharma Realm (Dharmadhātu)...[this nature] universally inherently-entails [all]."

Thus, for Zhanran, delusion and suffering have always existed and did not arise at some point out of a pure basis or devolved out an enlightened mind. At the same time, delusion and suffering are nothing but the threefold buddha-nature seen from the perspective of a Buddha (and thus, are also Buddhahood). Delusion contains in it the potential for wisdom and suffering the potential for nirvana.

Furthermore, even though we talk of sentient beings as containing a potential (the Proper Cause) which is not yet expressed or active (in beings who do not practice or know the Dharma, i.e. who are deluded and suffering), this is merely a provisional perspective. In reality, buddha-nature has always been functioning, and when Buddhahood is attained, one will realize that this previous perspective (of buddha-nature as a potential that has to be realized) was itself the Revealing Cause, and that one's practices to attain buddhahood were none other than the Conditioning Cause.

=== Space-like all-pervasiveness ===
The next step in Zhanran's exposition of buddha-nature is explaining its all-pervasiveness:

this nature is neither within nor without and pervades all space, and thus it is the same as all Buddhas and equal to the entire dharma-realm. Once he/she accepts that it pervades all, I would next reveal that it inherently includes and entails all. That is, since it is the same as all Buddhas and equal to the entire dharma-realm, this all pervasive nature inherently includes and entails the bodies of all Buddhas, such that one body is all bodies. And again, it (inherently includes and entails) all the lands that are called forth by all Buddhas, such that one land is all lands. The body and the land it inhabits are thus identical, such that speaking of the body is speaking of the land. The same is true for large and small and for one and many. It is because beings possess this nature that we say they have the (Buddha-)nature.

Zhanran emphasizes the all-pervasive character of buddha-nature as its defining attribute, employing this characteristic (which is also Suchness itself) to argue for its applicability to the insentient. Since Buddha-nature, by its very nature, is not some "thing" external nor internal to all things, and since excludes nothing, it must also pervade everything (at all times), including that which lacks sentience. For Zhanran, the proper view of buddha-nature must include an understanding that it is not just something "within" beings, but also something found "externally" as well. Indeed, it must pervade all things and thus can be described as a nature that “neither internal nor external but pervades all [like] empty space.” This universal character of buddha-nature is also shared with the three truths taught in Tiantai (and indeed, buddha-nature is in a way identical to the three truths).

Zhanran primarily derives his theory of buddha-nature's universality from Mahayana sutras which compare buddha-nature to space (虛空 ākāśa), seeing it as all-pervasive. The Mahāparinirvāṇa Sūtra for example states "the Buddha-Nature of sentient beings is like empty-space. Empty-space is neither [a thing] of the past, nor of the future, nor of the present; nothing is internal nor external [to it]…Buddha-Nature is also like this." The Mahāparinirvāṇa Sūtra also states that buddha-nature is all pervasive and omnipresent, permeating all times and places: "Those dharmas which have permanence [to them] pervade all places, like empty-space; there is nowhere where they do not exist. The Tathagatas are also like this; pervading all places and therefore they are permanent." This character of buddha-nature is also related to the fact that it is also, like nirvana, uncompounded (無爲, asaṃskṛtā), not-contingent or dependent on anything.

Zhanran draws on the idea of space because it is something which is found everywhere in a general sense. It is equally there in empty space and in "filled in" or occupied with matter. Likewise, buddha-nature is there when buddhahood is manifest and when it is locally absent. It is not something that can be removed nor attained or created, but unconditioned and omnipresent. This is the reason why for Zhanran, buddha-nature cannot be restricted to sentient beings and must also include the insentient. If it was restricted to living beings, buddha-nature would be limited and conditioned, which is inconsistent with the theory as described in the sutras.

=== Mutual Inclusion ===
Zhanran also invokes the Tiantai doctrine of inherent entailment (xingju 性具) or mutual inclusion. Dehn describes this unique and distinct Tiantai doctrine as follows: "the identities of things are not fixed or finite, but rather that all things always and everywhere inherently-entail 性具 all others— including their opposites." This means that, for any thing X, it can be said that it is non-dual with all non-Xs, since whatever is not X is also a part of what defines and conditions X. Since the identity of any individual thing is constituted also by what it is not, nothing could exist in a vacuum separated from all other things which are not it. Thus, every phenomenon (dharma) has an identity which includes what it is and also what it is not. As Dehn explains, "this entailing of every dharma or phenomena in every other must hold across the three times of past, present and future; it must be true of delusion and enlightenment, and cause and effect."

This theory includes the idea that there are indeed distinct individual phenomena, along with the idea that all distinct phenomena share a mutual identity. Thus, it does not collapse into a kind of existence monism. Brook Ziporyn explains the structure of this doctrine by comparing it to a joke, which has a setup and punchline. The setup's seriousness is part of what makes the punchline funny, and thus part of what makes the whole joke funny (which includes the setup itself, now recontextualized as "funny and serious", funny because it is serious). If the setup was not serious, it could not be funny, and there would be no joke. This dual identity is the structure of mutual inclusion between any entity and all other entities that are not it.

=== The non-duality of Buddhas, beings and lands ===
Mutual inclusion also means that delusion and sentient beings inherently entail wisdom and Buddhahood. Since Buddhahood pervades all things, sentient beings and their delusion are pervaded by Buddhahood. Due to inherent entailment, the same is true vice versa, meaning that Buddhahood also includes and is pervaded by "sentient-beingness" and delusion (which in turn inherently entail Buddhahood and wisdom). This symmetrical non-dual relationship between all phenomena is the Tiantai understanding of buddha-nature, which Zhanran supports by quoting a key passage from the Avatamsaka Sutra: "the three [mind, Buddhas, and sentient beings] are no different". For delusion to inherently entail wisdom means that wisdom also inherently entails delusion. It also means that both delusion and Buddha-wisdom inherently entail and pervade all dharmas. The same is true for Buddhahood and sentient-beingness. Zhanran compares this view with the view of other traditions, like Zen, who have an asymmetrical view in which buddha-nature or the pure mind included within deluded beings but the reverse is not true (i.e. delusion is not included within Buddhahood)

Relying on the doctrines of mutual inclusion and all-pervasiveness, Zhanran argues for "the non-duality of primary and dependent [karmic] recompense." This means that a being's karma fructifies as both their body and mind and as their environment. As such, Buddhas and their buddhalands are non-dual, and this is likewise the case of beings and their environment. Since sentient beings and Buddhas mutually entail each other (along with their lands), we can say insentient elements include buddha-nature. The mutual inclusion theory further entails the mutual inclusion of the ten dharma realms - a cosmological schema which contains all of reality. In this view, each realm of existence contains all others, and so do sentient and insentient phenomena as well. Mutual inclusion thus subverts the conventional dichotomy between subject and object, rendering their distinction merely provisional. Such a view affirms the non-duality of sentience and insentience, as well as of mentality and materiality, thereby undermining any absolute bifurcation between these categories.

Zhanran writes:

the common [and] the sacred are one suchness; [every] form and fragrance is utterly identical with purity. The circumstantial [retribution] (i.e. the objective and insentient world) and the true [retribution] (i.e. the subjective body) of the Avīci [Hell] are in all cases the mind of the Supreme Sage; the body and land of Vairo[cana] do not go beyond a single thought of the lowest vulgar [being].

Due to mutual inclusion and all-pervasiveness, Buddha bodies and buddhalands are understood as interwoven with all beings and all realms other than the Buddha realm. Consequently, even the material environments of this world—regarded as insentient—are affirmed to possess Buddha-nature. This doctrine establishes a continuity between Buddha-nature and insentient existence. Although Zhanran articulates a strong position regarding the presence of Buddha-nature in the insentient, he is less explicit concerning the possible realization of Buddhahood by insentient things. Nevertheless, the internal consistency of his argumentation appears to suggest such a possibility, since he must dissolve the rigid boundary between sentient and insentient existence.

=== Incorporation of Huayan ideas ===
Zhanran's view of Buddha-nature also shows traces of Huayan school influence (particularly from Fazang), especially in his discussion of the theory of "Suchness according with conditions" (真如随縁). Zhanran's Diamond Scalpel contains the following passage:

The myriad dharmas are none other than Suchness, because it is unchanging. Suchness expresses itself as the myriad dharmas, because it accords with conditions. Isn’t your belief that insentient beings lack Buddha-nature the same as saying that the myriad dharmas do not participate in Suchness?

According to Brook Ziporyn, the success of Zhanran's revival of Tiantai Buddhism was partly:

on the strength of his incorporation of Huayan "nature-origination" (xingqi) thought into the further development and schematization of the "nature-inclusion" (xingju) conceptions that Zhanran saw in classical Tiantai, with a corresponding but ambiguous tendency toward the idealism of the later (Chan-influenced) Huayan school. In Zhanran's case, this seems to have been a method by which nature-inclusion could be reinstated and gain the upper hand by sublating the Huayan strains of thought that had been gaining ground.

These Huayan influences would becoming more pronounced in the thought of later thinkers who drew on Zhanran, eventually culminating in the Song era debates between the faction of Siming Zhili and the so called "off mountain" faction.

== Bibliography ==
- Chen, Shuman (2011). Chinese Tiantai Doctrine on Insentient Things’ Buddha-Nature, Chung-Hwa Buddhist Journal 24, 71-104
- Chen, Shuman (2014). "The Liberation of Matter: Examining Jingxi Zhanran’s Philosophy of the Buddha-Nature of Insentient Beings in Tiantai Buddhism." PhD diss., Northwestern University.
- Dehn, Tyler (Rev. Jikai) (2023). "Buddha-Nature” (Foxing 佛性) in Zhanranʼs (湛然) Adamantine Scalpel Treatise (Jinʼgangpi Lun 金剛錍論), with special focus on its congruence with the Saddharmapundarika (Miaofalianhua Jing 妙法蓮華經) and Mahaparinirvana Sutras (Niepan Jing 涅槃經)", Dissertation, Macquarie University
- Guo Chaoshun 郭朝順, 1999, “Zhanran wuqing youxing sixiang zhong de zhenru gainian 湛然「無情有性」思想中的 「真如」概念 (The Concept of Suchness in Zhanran’s Thought on Insentient Beings Having Buddha-nature)”, Yuanguang Buddhist Periodical 圓光佛學學報, 3(February): 45–72.
- Jin, R. (2024). What is Other than “Us”: The Non-Buddhist Sources in the Chinese Buddhist Commentary Zhiguan Fuxing Chuanhong Jue. Journal of the European Association for Chinese Studies, 5, 207–223. doi:10.25365/jeacs.2024.5.jin
- Pap, Melinda (2011). Demonstration of the Buddha-nature of the Insentient in Zhanran's The Diamond Scalpel Treatise. Doctoral Dissertation, Budapest: Eötvös Loránd University
- Tseng, Chih-Mien, Adrian (2014). A Comparison of the Concepts of Buddha-Nature and Dao-Nature in Medieval China, PhD Thesis, Hamilton, Ontario: McMaster University, pp. 189-246
- Yu Xueming 俞学明, 2006, Zhanran yanjiu: Yi Tangdai Tiantaizong zhongxing wenti wei xiansuo 湛然研究: 以唐代天台宗中兴问题为线索 (A Study of Zhanran: A Clue to the Issue of the Revival of the Tiantai School in the Tang Dynasty). Beijing: Zhongguo shehui kexue.
- Ziporyn, Brook. (2000). Evil and/or/as the Good: Omnicentrism, Intersubjectivity, and Value Paradox in Tiantai Buddhist Thought, Harvard University.
