= Zen organisation and institutions =

Organization which promotes or facilitates Zen Buddhism

The Zen tradition is maintained and transferred by a high degree of institutionalisation, despite the emphasis on individual experience and the iconoclastic picture of Zen.

In Japan, modernity has led to criticism of the formal system and the commencement of lay-oriented Zen-schools such as the Sanbo Kyodan and the Ningen Zen Kyodan. How to organize the continuity of the Zen-tradition in the west, constraining charismatic authority and the derailment it may bring on the one hand, and maintaining the legitimacy and authority by limiting the number of authorized teachers on the other hand, is a challenge for the developing Zen-communities in the west.

== Temple-training ==
Since the East Mountain Teaching, Zen has centered on monastic life. In modern Soto and Rinzai, monasteries serve as training facilities to educate Zen priests, most of whom move on to run their own temple. Japanese laity has been allowed to participate in Zen training only since the Meiji Restoration.

Japanese Soto and Rinzai are organized in a system of head-temples and sub-temples.

=== Soto ===
Contemporary Soto-shu has four classes of temples:

1. Honzan (本山), head temples, namely Eihei-ji and Sōji-ji;
2. Kakuchi, teaching monasteries, where at least once a year an ango (ninety-day retreat) takes place;
3. Hōchi, dharma temples;
4. Jun hōchi, ordinary temples.

The two head temples or honzan (本山) of the Sōtō sect are Eihei-ji and Sōji-ji. While Eihei-ji owes its existence to Dōgen, throughout history this head temple has had significantly fewer sub-temple affiliates than the Sōji-ji. During the Tokugawa period, Eiheiji had approximately 1,300 affiliate temples compared to Sōji-ji's 16,200. Furthermore, out of the more than 14,000 temples of the Sōtō sect today, 13,850 of those identify themselves as affiliates of Sōji-ji. Additionally, most of the some 148 temples that are affiliates of Eiheiji today are only minor temples located in Hokkaido— founded during a period of colonization during the Meiji period. Therefore, it is often said that Eiheiji is a head temple only in the sense that it is "head of all Sōtō dharma lineages.

In an advice to western practitioners, Kojun Kishigami Osho, a dharma heir of Kodo Sawaki, writes:

Every year, about 150 novices arrive. About 90 percent of them are sons of temple heads, which leaves only 10 percent who chose this path for themselves. For the autumn session, about 250 monks come together. Essentially what they are learning in these temples is the ability to officiate all kinds of ceremonies and rites practiced by the Soto School – the methods for fulfilling their role. Apart from this aspect, practicing with the idea of developing one’s own spirituality is not prevalent. (Note: Kojun Kishigami Osho, Of roots and branches)

=== Rinzai ===
The Rinzai-school has 14 main-temples, to which subsidiary temples are attached. The 14 branches of Rinzai, by head temple, are: (Note: Head Temples) (Note: Rinzai-Obaku zen)

- Daitoku-ji (founded by Shūhō Myōchō)
- Eigen-ji
- Engaku-ji
- Hōkō-ji
- Kenchō-ji
- Kennin-ji
- Kōgaku-ji
- Kokutai-ji
- Myōshin-ji (founded in 1342 by Kanzan Egen Zenji)
- Nanzen-ji (founded by Musō Soseki)
- Shōkoku-ji
- Tenryū-ji (founded by Musō Soseki)
- Tōfuku-ji (founded by Enni Ben'en, 1202–1280)

Sometimes a 15th is included:

- Manpuku-ji, properly part of Ōbaku instead

== Dharma transmission ==
In the western understanding, dharma transmission is primarily the affirmation of awakening by a teacher. But is also part of the continuation and maintenance of Zen-institutions.

=== Function of Dharma Transmission ===
==== Esoteric and exoteric transmission ====
According to Borup the emphasis on 'mind to mind transmission' is a form of esoteric transmission, in which "the tradition and the enlightened mind is transmitted face to face". Metaphorically this can be described as the transmission from a flame from one candle to another candle, or the transmission from one vein to another.

Exoteric transmission requires "direct access to the teaching through a personal discovery of one's self. This type of transmission and identification is symbolized by the discovery of a shining lantern, or a mirror."

This polarity is recognizable in the emphasis that the Zen-tradition puts on maintaining the correct Dharma transmission, while simultaneously stressing seeing into one's nature. Seeing one's nature gives an autonomous confirmation of Zen's ultimate truth, which may conflict with the need to maintain institutions and traditions. (Note: See Sharf (1995c) for an exposition of the problems that the Sanbo Kyodan faced, after the death of Yamada Koun. As Sharf notes: "[C]harisma can spread too widely, and the resulting centripetal forces pull the organisation apart, with new sects spinning off in several directions".; "[T]he Sanbo Kyodan would not survive long were it to elevate every student with kensho to the status of master".; "The institution would have little chance of survival were it not to balance claims concerning the ultimacy and autonomy of kensho with a course of training that inspires obedience and loyalty to the tradition".; These remarks also seem to apply to USA-zen, which lacks central authority, despite the formal ties to Soto-shu of many groups.)

==== Family structure ====
According to Bodiford, "Zen is the predominant form of Buddhism because of dharma transmission":

[I]t has ancestors whom it honors. It honors those ancestors by transmitting their legacy to proper descendants, from generation to generation, who will maintain and carry on their family traditions [...] [I]n Zen this process of transmitting a family legacy is given structural form through the ritual of dharma transmission.

Bodiford distinguishes seven dimension which are discernible in both family relationships and in dharma lineages:

1. Ancestral dimension: "Ancestors (so) constitute a fundamental source of power". Performing rituals in honour of the ancestors keeps them in high regard "among the living".
2. Biological dimension: the dharma lineage creates (spiritual) offspring, just as the family creates new life.
3. Linguistic dimension: dharma heirs receive new names, which reflect their tie to the dharma 'family'.
4. Ritual dimension: rituals confirm the family relationships. One's teacher is honored in rituals, as are deceised teachers.
5. Legal dimension: teachers have the obligation to discipline their students, just as students have the obligation to obey their teachers.
6. Institutional and financial dimension: dharma heirs have an obligation to support their home temple, both financially and ritually.
7. Temporal dimension: long-term relationships foster the previous dimensions.

The family-model is easier recognized when East Asian languages are being used, because the same terminology is used to describe both earthly and spiritual family relations.

=== Contemporary use of Dharma transmission ===
In Soto, dharma transmission establishes a lifelong relation between teacher and student. To qualify as a Zen priest, further training is required.

In Rinzai, the most common form of transmission is the acknowledgement that one has stayed in the monastery for a certain amount of time, and may later become a temple priest. The common transmission does not include inka shōmei, which is being used for the transmission of the "true lineage" of the masters (shike) of the training halls. Training halls are temples which are authorised for further training after being qualified as a temple priest. There are only about fifty to a hundred of such inka shōmei-bearers in Japan.

Although the formal transmission of the dharma-lineage, from Shakyamuni Buddha to the present day, is preserved in this way, it is also seen as problematical in contemporary Zen.

=== Self-awakening ===
The Zen tradition has always stressed the importance of formal Dharma transmission, but there are indeed well known examples of Mushi dokugo, self-awakening, such as Nōnin, Jinul and Suzuki Shōsan who attained awakening on their own, though all of them were familiair with the Zen-teachings.

== Zen Universities ==
Both Soto and Rinzai have educational institutions, such as Komazawa University and Hanazono University, which stand in strong competition. Several Zen-teachers known in the west have studied there, such as Shohaku Okumura and Keido Fukushima. The Kyoto University was the centre of activities for the Kyoto School, to which belong Keiji Nishitani and Masao Abe.

== Organization of Western Zen ==
Western Zen is mainly a lay-movement, though grounded in formal lineages. Its Japanese background is in mainly lay-oriented new religious movements, especially the Sanbo Kyodan. Though a number of zen-buddhist monasteries exist in the western world, most practice takes place in Zen centers throughout the western world.

Koné sees three issues in the emerging western Zen tradition: sustainability, legitimacy, and authority.

- Sustainability: Zen groups and organizations need income to survive. "Covert centers" offer meditation courses, for which they charge a fee. These groups "often experience a high turnover, with a core of long-time practitioners". "Residential centers" have a limited number of long term residents, with a high commitment, who serve a larger lay community. Income is generated by donations. Publicity is low-key, since a rapid growth would threaten the continuity.
- Legitimacy: Zen groups need legitimacy, which is "social recognition and acceptance". The primary means for this is the "master-disciple relationship" and the "central reference to transmission". Various attitudes toward the tradition are possible: emulating the traditions, adaptation of the tradition, a critical stance toward the tradition, and borrowing from the tradition.
- Authority: two patterns are discernable, namely spiritual achievement and "spiritual friendship", and "spiritual hierarchy". Smaller groups tend toward egalitarity and spiritual friendship, where-as larger groups tend toward more hierarchical organisation.

A recurrent issue has been the reliance on charismatic authority and the resulting teacher scandals. Sandra Bell has analysed the scandals at Vajradhatu and the San Francisco Zen Center and concluded that these kinds of scandals are

... most likely to occur in organisations that are in transition between the pure forms of charismatic authority that brought them into being and more rational, corporate forms of organization".

Robert Sharf also mentions charisma from which institutional power is derived, and the need to balance charismatic authority with institutional authority. Elaborate analyses of these scandals are made by Stuart Lachs, who mentions the uncritical acceptance of religious narratives, such as lineages and dharma transmission, which aid in giving uncritical charismatic powers to teachers and leaders.

The scandals eventually lead to rules of conduct by the American Zen Teachers Association, and the reorganising of Zen Centers, to spread the management of those centers over a wider group of people and diminish the role of charismatic authority. Another affect was the split in various Zen organisations, such as Robert Aitken leaving the Sanbo Kyodan, and Joko Beck leaving the White Plum Sangha.

== See also ==
- List of Buddhists
- Outline of Buddhism
- Timeline of Buddhism
- Chinese Chan

== Sources ==
- Abe, Masao (1989), Zen and Western Thought, translated by William R. LeFleur, University of Hawaii Press
- Abe, Masao; Heine, Seteven (1996), Zen and Comparative Studies, University of Hawaii Press
- Aitken, Robert (1994), Foreword to "A Buddhist Bible", Boston, Massachusetts: Beacon Press
- Anderson, Reb (2000), Being Upright: Zen Meditation and the Bodhisattva Precepts, Rodmell Press
- Arokiasamy, Arul M. (2005), Zen: Awakening to Your Original Face, Chennai, India: Thiruvanmiyur
- Batchelor, Martine (2004), The Path Of Compassion: The Bodhisattva Precepts, Rowman Altamira
- Bell, Sandra (2002), Scandals in emerging Western Buddhism. In: Westward Dharma: Buddhism beyond Asia. Pages 230-242 (PDF), Berkeley: University of California Press
- Bodiford, William M. (1992), Zen in the Art of Funerals: Ritual Salvation in Japanese Buddhism. In: 'History of Religions' 32, no. 2 (1992): 150
- Bodiford, William M. (1993), Sōtō Zen in Medieval Japan, University of Hawaii Press, ISBN 0-8248-1482-7
- Bodiford, William M. (2008), "Dharma Transmission in Theory and Practice", in Steven Heine; Dale S. Wright (eds.), Zen Ritual: Studies of Zen Buddhist Theory in Practice (PDF), Oxford University Press, pp. 261–282, doi:10.1093/acprof:oso/9780195304671.003.0010, ISBN 978-0-19-530467-1, archived from the original (PDF) on 8 February 2023
- Borup, Jørn (2008), Japanese Rinzai Zen Buddhism: Myōshinji, a Living Religion, Brill
- Brown Holt, Linda (1995), "From India to China: Transformations in Buddhist Philosophy", Qi: The Journal of Traditional Eastern Health & Fitness
- Buswell, Robert E. (1991), The "Short-cut" Approach of K'an-hua Meditation: The Evolution of a Practical Subitism in Chinese Ch'an Buddhism. In: Peter N. Gregory (editor) (1991), Sudden and Gradual. Approaches to Enlightenment in Chinese Thought, Delhi: Motilal Banarsidass Publishers Private Limited
- Buswell, Robert E (1993), Ch'an Hermeneutics: A Korean View. In: Donald S. Lopez, Jr. (ed.)(1993), Buddhist Hermeneutics, Delhi: Motilal Banarsidass
- Blyth, R. H. (1966), Zen and Zen Classics, Volume 4, Tokyo: Hokuseido Press
- Chappell, David W. (1993), Hermeneutical Phases in Chinese Buddhism. In: Donald S. Lopez, Jr. (ed.)(1993), Buddhist Hermeneutics, Delhi: Motilal Banarsidass
- Cleary, Thomas (2010), Translator's introduction. The Undying Lamp of Zen. The Testament of Zen Master Torei, Boston & London: Shambhala
- Collins, Randall (2000), The Sociology of Philosophies: A Global Theory of Intellectual Change, Harvard University Press
- Dumonlin, Heinrich (2000), A History of Zen Buddhism, New Delhi: Munshiram Manoharlal Publishers Pvt. Ltd.
- Dumoulin, Heinrich (2005a), Zen Buddhism: A History. Volume 1: India and China, World Wisdom Books, ISBN 978-0-941532-89-1
- Dumoulin, Heinrich (2005b), Zen Buddhism: A History. Volume 2: Japan, World Wisdom Books, ISBN 978-0-941532-90-7
- Faure, Bernard (2000), Visions of Power. Imaging Medieval Japanese Buddhism, Princeton, New Jersey: Princeton University Press
- Ferguson, Andy (2000), Zen's Chinese Heritage, Boston, MA: Wisdom Publications, ISBN 0-86171-163-7
- Ford, James Myoun, A Note On Dharma Transmission And The Institutions Of Zen
- Foulk, T. Griffith (n.d.), History of the Soto Zen School
- Fowler, Merv (2005), Zen Buddhism: Beliefs and Practices, Sussex Academic Press, ISBN 9781902210421
- Gimello, Robert M. (1994), "Marga and Culture: Learning, Letters, and Liberation in Northern Sung Ch'an", in Buswell & Gimello (eds.), Paths to Liberation, Delhi: Motilal Banarsidass Publishers, pp. 475–505
- Goddard, Dwight (2007), History of Ch'an Buddhism previous to the times of Hui-neng (Wie-lang). In: A Buddhist Bible, Forgotten Books, ISBN 9781605061047
- Gregory, Peter N. (1991), Sudden Enlightenment Followed by Gradual Cultivation: Tsung-mi's Analysis of mind. In: Peter N. Gregory (editor)(1991), Sudden and Gradual. Approaches to Enlightenment in Chinese Thought, Delhi: Motilal Banarsidass Publishers Private Limited
- Gregory, Peter N. (1993), What Happened to the "Perfect Teaching"? Another lOok at Hua-yen Buddhist hermeneutics. In: Donald S. Lopez, Jr. (ed.)(1993), Buddhist Hermeneutics, Delhi: Motilal Banarsidass
- Harvey, Peter (1995), An introduction to Buddhism. Teachings, history and practices, Cambridge University Press
- Haskel, Peter (1984), Bankei Zen. Translations from The Record of Bankei, New York: Grove Weidenfeld
- Heine, Steven; Wright, Dale S. (2000). The Koan: Texts and Contexts in Zen Buddhism. Oxford University Press. ISBN 0-19-511748-4.
- Heine, Steven (2007), "A Critical Survey of Works on Zen since Yampolsky.", Philosophy East & West, 57 (4): 577–592, doi:10.1353/pew.2007.0047, S2CID 170450246
- Heine, Steven (2008), Zen Skin, Zen Marrow
- Hisamatsu, Shin'ichi; Gishin Tokiwa; Christopher Ives (2002), Critical Sermons of the Zen Tradition: Hisamatsu's Talks on Linji, University of Hawaii Press
- Hori, Victor Sogen (1994), "Teaching and Learning in the Zen Rinzai Monastery" (PDF), Journal of Japanese Studies, 20 (1): 5–35, doi:10.2307/132782, JSTOR 132782, archived from the original on October 19, 2019
- Hori, Victor Sogen (2000), Koan and Kensho in the Rinzai Zen Curriculum. In: Steven Heine and Dale S. Wright (eds)(2000): "The Koan. Texts and Contexts in Zen Buddhism, Oxford: Oxford University Press
- Hori, Victor Sogen (2005), Introduction. In: Dumoulin, Heinrich (2005), Zen Buddhism: A History. Volume 2: Japan. World Wisdom Books. ISBN 978-0-941532-90-7. Pagina xiii - xxi (PDF)
- Hu Shih (1953), "Ch'an (Zen) Buddhism in China. Its History and Method", Philosophy East and West, 3 (1): 3–24, doi:10.2307/1397361, JSTOR 1397361
- Huaijin, Nan (1997), Basic Buddhism: Exploring Buddhism and Zen, York Beach: Samuel Weiser
- Isshū, Miura; Sasaki, Ruth F. (1993), The Zen Koan, New York: Harcourt Brace & Company, ISBN 0-15-699981-1
- Jaksch, Mary (2007), The Road to Nowhere. Koans and the Deconstruction of the Zen Saga (PDF)
- Jorgensen, John (1991), "Heinrich Dumoulin's Zen Buddhism: A History", Japanese Journal of Religious Studies, 18 (4), doi:10.18874/jjrs.18.4.1991.377-400
- Kalupahana, David J. (1992), The Principles of Buddhist Psychology, Delhi: ri Satguru Publications
- Kalupahana, David J. (1994), A history of Buddhist philosophy, Delhi: Motilal Banarsidass Publishers Private Limited
- Kapleau, Philip (1989), The three pillars of Zen
- Kasulis, Thomas P. (2003), Ch'an Spirituality. In: Buddhist Spirituality. Later China, Korea, Japan and the Modern World; edited by Takeuchi Yoshinori, Delhi: Motilal Banarsidass
- Katz, Jerry (2007), One: Essential Writings on Nonduality, Sentient Publications
- Koné, Alioune (2000), Zen In Europe: A Survey of the Territory, archived from the original on 2012-05-07
- Lachs, Stuart (n.d.), Reply to Vladimir K
- Lachs, Stuart (1999), Means of Authorization: Establishing Hierarchy in Ch'an /Zen Buddhism in America
- Lachs, Stuart (2002), Richard Baker and the Myth of the Zen Roshi
- Lachs, Stuart (2006), The Zen Master in America: Dressing the Donkey with Bells and Scarves
- Lachs, Stuart (2011), When the Saints Go Marching In: Modern Day Zen Hagiography (PDF)
- Lachs, Stuart (2012), Hua-t'ou : A Method of Zen Meditation (PDF)
- Lai, Whalen (2003), Buddhism in China: A Historical Survey. In Antonio S. Cua (ed.): Encyclopedia of Chinese Philosophy (PDF), New York: Routledge, archived from the original (PDF) on November 12, 2014
- Lai, Whalen (n.d.), Ma-Tsu Tao-I And The Unfolding Of Southern Zen
- Lathouwers, Ton (2000), Meer dan een mens kan doen. Zentoespraken, Rotterdam: Asoka
- Liang-Chieh (1986), The Record of Tung-shan, translated by William F. Powell, Kuroda Institute
- Lievens, Bavo (1981), Ma-tsu. De gesprekken, Bussum: Het Wereldvenster
- Loori, John Daido (2006), Sitting with Koans: Essential Writings on Zen Koan Introspection, Wisdom Publications, ISBN 0-86171-369-9
- Low, Albert (2000), Zen and the Sutras, Boston: Turtle Publishing
- Low, Albert (2006), Hakuin on Kensho. The Four Ways of Knowing, Boston & London: Shambhala
- The Surangama Sutra (PDF), translated by Luk, Charles, Buddha Dharma Education Association Inc., n.d., archived from the original (PDF) on October 23, 2013
- Matthiessen, Peter (1987), Nine-headed dragon river: Zen journals, 1969-1985, Shambhala
- McCauley, Charles (2005), Zen and the Art of Wholeness, iUniverse
- McMahan, David L. (2008), The Making of Buddhist Modernism, Oxford University Press, ISBN 978-0-19-518327-6
- McRae, John (1991), Shen-hui and the Teaching of Sudden Enlightenment in Early Ch'an Buddhism. In: Peter N. Gregory (editor)(1991), Sudden and Gradual. Approaches to Enlightenment in Chinese Thought, Delhi: Motilal Banarsidass Publishers Private Limited
- McRae, John (2003), Seeing Through Zen, The University Press Group Ltd, ISBN 9780520237988
- McRae, John (2005), Critical introduction by John McRae to the reprint of Dumoulin's A history of Zen (PDF)
- McRae, John (2008), THE PLATFORM SUTRA OF THE SIXTH PATRIARCH. Translated from the Chinese of Zongbao (Taishō Volume 48, Number 2008) by John R. McRae (PDF), archived from the original (PDF) on August 22, 2012
- Meng-Tat Chia, Jack (2011), "A Review of Enlightenment in Dispute: The Reinvention of Chan Buddhism in Seventeenth-Century China" (PDF), Journal of Buddhist Ethics, 18
- Mumon, Yamada (2004), The Ten Oxherding Pictures, translated by Victor Sōgen Hori, University of Hawai'i press
- Nadeau, Randall L. (2012), The Wiley-Blackwell Companion to Chinese Religions, John Wiley & Sons
- Oh, Kang-nam (2000), "The Taoist Influence on Hua-yen Buddhism: A Case of the Scinicization of Buddhism in China", Chung-Hwa Buddhist Journal, 13
- Pajin, Dusan (1988), On Faith in Mind - Translation and Analysis of the Hsin Hsin Ming. In: Journal of Oriental Studies, Vol. XXVI, No. 2, Hong Kong 1988, pp. 270-288
- Poceski, Mario (n.d.), Attitudes Towards Canonicity and Religious Authority in Tang Chan
- Sato, Kemmyō Taira, D.T. Suzuki and the Question of War (PDF)
- Sasaki, Ruth Fuller (2009), The Record of Linji. Translation and commentary by Ruth Fuller Sasaki. Edited by Thomas Yūhō Kirchner (PDF), Honolulu: University of Hawai‘i Press
- Schlütter, Morten (2008), How Zen became Zen. The Dispute over Enlightenment and the Formation of Chan Buddhism in Song-Dynasty China, Honolulu: University of Hawai'i Press, ISBN 978-0-8248-3508-8
- Sekida, Katuski (1996), Two Zen Classics. Mumonkan, the gateless gate. Hekiganroku, the blue cliff record, New York & Tokyo: Weatherhill
- Sharf, Robert H. (August 1993), "The Zen of Japanese Nationalism", History of Religions, 33 (1): 1–43, doi:10.1086/463354, S2CID 161535877
- Sharf, Robert H. (1995), Whose Zen? Zen Nationalism Revisited (PDF)
- Sharf, Robert H. (1995b), "Buddhist Modernism and the Rhetoric of Meditative Experience" (PDF), NUMEN, 42 (3): 228–283, doi:10.1163/1568527952598549, hdl:2027.42/43810
- Sharf, Robert H. (1995c), "Sanbokyodan. Zen and the Way of the New Religions" (PDF), Japanese Journal of Religious Studies, 22 (3–4), doi:10.18874/jjrs.22.3-4.1995.417-458
- Shimano, Eido T. (1991), Points of Departure: Zen Buddhism With a Rinzai View, Livingston Manor, NY: The Zen Studies Society Press, ISBN 0-9629246-0-1
- Snelling, John (1987), The Buddhist handbook. A Complete Guide to Buddhist Teaching and Practice, London: Century Paperbacks
- Suzuki, Shunryu (1997), Branching streams flow in the darkness: Zen talks on the Sandokai, University of California Press, ISBN 9780520222267
- Swanson, Paul L. (1993), The Spirituality of Emptiness in Early chinese Buddhism. In: Buddhist Spirituality. Indian, Southeast Asian, Tibetan, Early Chinese; edited by Takeuchi Yoshinori, New York: Crossroad
- Tetsuo, Otani (2003), To Transmit Dogen Zenji's Dharma (PDF)
- Tomoaki, Tsuchida (2003), The Monastic spirituality of Zen Master Dogen. In: Buddhist Spirituality. Later China, Korea, Japan and the Modern World; edited by Takeuchi Yoshinori, Delhi: Motilal Banarsidass
- Torei (2010), The Undying Lamp of Zen. The Testament of Zen Master Torei, translated by Thomas Cleary, Boston & London: Shambhala
- Tweed, Thomas A. (2005), "American Occultism and Japanese Buddhism. Albert J. Edmunds, D. T. Suzuki, and Translocative History" (PDF), Japanese Journal of Religious Studies, 32 (2): 249–281, archived from the original (PDF) on 2012-05-22
- Verstappen, Stefan H. (2004), Blind Zen, Red Mansion Pub, ISBN 9781891688034
- Victoria, Brian Daizen (2006), Zen at war (Second ed.), Lanham e.a.: Rowman & Littlefield Publishers, Inc.
- Victoria, Brian Daizen (2010), "The "Negative Side" of D. T. Suzuki's Relationship to War" (PDF), The Eastern Buddhist, 41 (2): 97–138
- Waddell, Norman (2010), Foreword to "Wild Ivy: The Spiritual Autobiography of Zen Master Hakuin", Shambhala Publications
- The Diamond Sutra. In: A Buddhist Bible, translated by Wai-tao, Boston, Massachusetts: Beacon Press, 1994
- Wayman, Alex and Hideko (1990), The Lion's roar of Queen Srimala, Delhi: Motilal Banarsidass Publishers
- Welter, Albert (n.d.), The Textual History of the Linji lu (Record of Linji): The Earliest Recorded Fragments
- Welter, Albert (n.d.), The Formation of the Linji lu: An Examination of the Guangdeng lu/Sijia yulu and Linji Huizhao Chanshi yulu. Versions of the Linji lu in Historical Context (PDF)
- Welter, Albert (2000), Mahakasyapa's smile. Silent Transmission and the Kung-an (Koan) Tradition. In: Steven Heine and Dale S. Wright (eds)(2000): "The Koan. Texts and Contexts in Zen Buddhism, Oxford: Oxford University Press
- Wolfe, Robert (2009), Living Nonduality: Enlightenment Teachings of Self-Realization, Karina Library
- Wright, Dale S. (2010), Humanizing the Image of a Zen master: Taizan Maezumi Roshi. In: Zen Masters, edited bySteven Heine and Dale S. Wright, Oxford: Oxford University Press
- Yampolski, Philip (1967), The Platform Sutra of the Sixth Patriarch. Translated with notes by Philip B. Yampolsky, Columbia University Press, ISBN 0-231-08361-0
- Yampolski, Philip (2003a), Chan. A Historical Sketch. In: Buddhist Spirituality. Later China, Korea, Japan and the Modern World; edited by Takeuchi Yoshinori, Delhi: Motilal Banarsidass
- Yampolski, Philip (2003b), Zen. A Historical Sketch. In: Buddhist Spirituality. Later China, Korea, Japan and the Modern World; edited by Takeuchi Yoshinori, Delhi: Motilal Banarsidass
- Yanagida, Seizan (2009), Historical Introduction to The Record of Linji. In: The record of Linji, translated by Ruth Fuller Sasakia e.a. Pages 59-115 (PDF), University of Hawaii Press
- Yen, Chan Master Sheng (1996), Dharma Drum: The Life and Heart of Ch'an Practice, Boston & London: Shambhala
- Young, Stuart (2009), Linji Lu and Chinese Orthodoxy. Review of "Albert Welter. The Linji lu and the Creation of Chan Orthodoxy: The Development of Chan's Records of Sayings Literature.
