= Sanshin Zen Community =

American Soto Zen sangha

Sanshin-ji
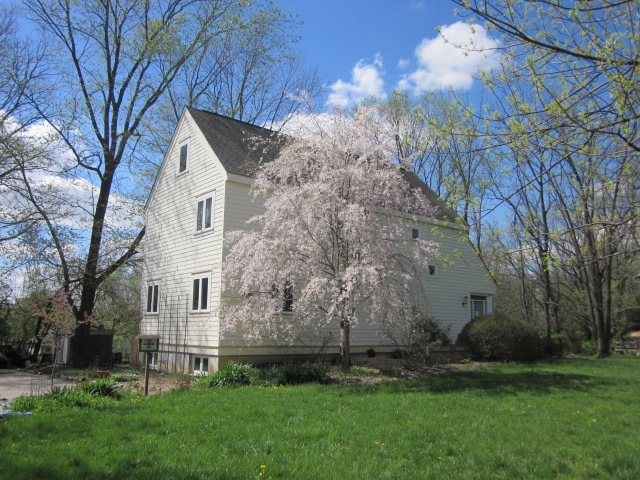

Religion
- Affiliation: Sōtō

Location
- Location: 1728 S Olive St. Bloomington, Indiana
- Country: United States
- Interactive map of Sanshin-ji
- Coordinates: 39.147735°N 86.519626°W

Architecture
- Founder: Shohaku Okumura
- Completed: 1996

Website
- Official Website

Sanshin Zen Community is a Soto Zen sangha based at the temple Sanshin-ji in Bloomington, Indiana founded by Shohaku Okumura.

== History ==
The Sanshin Zen Community was incorporated as an organization in 1996 by Shohaku Okumura after serving as the interim abbot of the Minnesota Zen Meditation Center since 1992. He chose the name sanshin (三心, sanshin), meaning "three minds", in reference to Eihei Dogen's teaching from the Tenzo Kyōkun of the three minds a Zen student should cultivate: magnanimous mind, parental mind, and joyful mind. However, the following year the Sōtō-shumucho, the administrative body of Sōtō Zen in Japan, asked Okumura to head the Soto Zen Education Center in San Francisco, to which he agreed, delaying his plans to found his own temple. While still serving in that position, his friend and Buddhist Studies scholar John McRae, recommended locating his temple in Bloomington, Indiana. By 2002 land had been purchased and a local architect employed to design a combined zendo and living space for the Okumura family.

The sangha follows a modified monastic schedule with a retreat each month. Sanshin is one of the few Zen communities offering a sesshin ('without toys') in the style of Uchiyama-roshi, featuring 14 hours of zazen per day with no ceremonies, work, or Dharma talks. Okumura also offers regular Genzo-e retreats devoted to studying one of the fascicles of Dōgen Zenji's Shōbōgenzō; he also travels to give them at other prominent North American Zen Centers. Since the founding of Sanshin-ji, Okumura has ordained multiple students as priests, some of whom have gone on to found their own temples and monasteries elsewhere. For example, Okumura's student Densho Quintero had founded the Comunidad Soto Zen de Colombia in Bogotá in 1989, while Shōryū Bradley founded the Gyobutsuji Zen Monastery in Arkansas in 2011. In early 2016 it was announced that the founding abbot Shohaku Okumura would retire in 2023 to be gradually succeeded by his student Hoko Karnegis, who would serve as vice abbot in the interim.

=== Lineage ===
The style of practice at this zendo follows the lineage of Kosho Uchiyama-roshi and his teacher, Kodo Sawaki-roshi, who founded Antaiji temple, and greatly simplified the Soto Zen forms used there.

== See also ==
- Timeline of Zen Buddhism in the United States
