= Gyobutsuji Zen Monastery =

Sōtō Zen Buddhist monastery near Kingston, Arkansas

- Location in Arkansas

Religion
- Affiliation: Buddhism
- Rite: Sōtō Zen, Sawaki Lineage
- Ecclesiastical or organizational status: Monastery
- Status: Active

Location
- Location: Country Road 9, Kingston, Arkansas, 72742
- Country: United States
- Interactive map of Gyobutsuji Zen Monastery
- Coordinates: 35°59′15″N 93°27′10″W

Architecture
- Founder: Shoryu Bradley
- Completed: 2011

Website
- gyobutsuji.org

Gyobutsuji Zen Monastery (行仏寺, gyōbutsu-ji) is a small Sōtō Zen Buddhist monastery near Kingston in Madison County, Arkansas in the United States. It is located in the Boston Mountains of the Ozarks. The temple focuses primarily on the practice of zazen in the tradition of Kosho Uchiyama and Shohaku Okumura, the latter being the teacher of the founder, Shōryū Bradley. Study of the writings of Eihei Dōgen and the teachings of Shakyamuni Buddha are also emphasized. The monastery holds a five-day sesshin every month except in February and August. Sesshins are Uchiyama-style consisting of 14 periods of zazen (50 minutes) and kinhin (10 minutes) without liturgy, dokusan or ōryōki.

The name Gyōbutsu-ji literally means 'Practice Buddha Temple' and is derived from Eihei Dōgen's magnum opus the Shōbōgenzō, specifically the chapter titled Gyōbutsu igi (行仏威儀). While the standard Classical Chinese interpretation of this title is "practice Buddha's dignified actions", Dōgen re-interpreted it as "dignified actions of the Practice Buddha" in line with his assertion that practice and enlightenment are the same. The chapter explains:

All buddhas without exception fully practice dignified conduct: this [practice] is Practice Buddha. ... Sharing one corner of the Buddha's dignified conduct is done together with the entire universe, the great earth, and with the entire coming-and-going of life-and-death. ... This is nothing other than the dignified conduct of the oneness of Practice and Buddha.
