= Valley Zendo =

Zen hall in Massachusetts, US

Pioneer Valley Zendo is a Soto Zen zendo established in 1976 in Charlemont, Massachusetts, United States, as a sister-temple to Antai-ji in Japan, where Kosho Uchiyama was rōshi.

== History ==
In 1974, Steve Yenik and Koshi Ichida arrived from Japan and began raising funds to create a zendo in the forest hills near the Vermont border. Ichida was joined by Eishin Ikeda and Shohaku Okumura. Reverend Issho Fujita was the resident teacher from 1987 until 2005. Eishin Ikeda, who later led the Bean Town Sangha (founded by Eishin Ikeda and Michael Flessas) whose first meetings were held on the second floor of a book store in Arlington, Massachusetts, returned as the present resident priest in 2006.

== See also ==
- Timeline of Zen Buddhism in the United States
