= William Bodiford =

American academic (born 1955)

William M. Bodiford
- Born: December 3, 1955 (age 70)
- Education: University of Kansas; Yale University; University of Tsukuba; Komazawa University
- Occupation: Professor
- Writing career
- Genre: Non-fiction
- Subject: Religion
- Notable work: Sōtō Zen in Medieval Japan

William Marvin Bodiford (born December 3, 1955) is an American professor and author. He teaches Buddhist Studies and religion in the cultures of Japan and East Asia at the University of California, Los Angeles.

== Education and early career ==
In his section "Acknowledgments" in his book Sōtō Zen in Medieval Japan, Bodiford thanks the monks of the Eihei-ji temple in Japan who "kindly broke the rules" to teach him, before his university education began, about Sōtō Zen and Japanese beer.

Bodiford earned his PhD in Buddhist Studies at Yale University and did additional graduate training at the University of Tsukuba and Komazawa University.

Before moving to UCLA, he taught at Davidson College, the University of Iowa, and Meiji Gakuin University in Tokyo and Yokohama, Japan.

== Sōtō Zen in Medieval Japan ==
Bodiford's book Sōtō Zen in Medieval Japan (1993 and 2008) began as his dissertation written at Yale (1989) under Stanley Weinstein. Fabio Rambelli, who reviewed the book in 1994 for The Journal of Asian Studies, writes that the author delivers an alternative to the "traditional dichotomy between 'pure' Zen and 'popular' religion". Christopher Ives writes in the Journal of Japanese Studies that the book is the "most important English work on Sōtō Zen to date".

== Other activities and research ==
He presented his paper on the birth of Ise Shinto at the 2008 annual meeting of the Association for Asian Studies (AAS) in a session organized by Rambelli. In 2009, Bodiford participated with Shoji Yamada of International Research Center for Japanese Studies in Japan and William R. Lafleur of the University of Pennsylvania in a panel at the AAS annual meeting. In 2011, he sat on a panel with Steven Heine, Taigen Dan Leighton, Shohaku Okumura and others for a conference on Dogen Zenji organized by Heine's school, Florida International University. In May 2023, he gave a lecture on "Buddhist and Samurai Views of the Japanese 'Watery Moon' Motif" at UC Santa Barbara.

Bodiford researches Japanese history from medieval times to the present. He has published works on the Tendai and Vinaya Buddhist traditions, on Shinto, and other subjects. He is an associate editor of Macmillan Reference USA's Encyclopedia of Buddhism.

== Publications ==
=== Books ===
- Bodiford, William M. (2008) [1993]. Sōtō Zen in Medieval Japan. University of Hawaii Press. ISBN 978-0824833039.
- Bodiford, William M. (2005). Going Forth: Visions of Buddhist Vinaya. University of Hawaii Press. ISBN 0824827872.
- Buswell, Robert E. Jr., ed. (2003). Encyclopedia of Buddhism. Bodiford, William (associate editor). Macmillan. ISBN 0028657187.

=== Articles ===
- Bodiford, William M. 2025. “Introduction to the Shōbōgenzō.” In Treasury of the True Dharma Eye: Dōgen’s Shōbōgenzō. Translated by the Sōtō Zen Text Project. Honolulu: University of Hawai‘i Press. Volume 8, pp. 1–287 (287 pages).
- Bodiford, William M. 2023. “La relecture des écritures bouddhiques en Chine et chez Dōgen” (“The Re-reading of Buddhist Scriptures in China and in Dōgen,” translated by Frédéric Girard), in L’identité du japonais face aux traductions: les cas du bouddhisme, de la philosophie et du kanbun (special issue). Des mots aux actes 12: 163–192.
- Bodiford, William M. 2021. "Introduction". In Keizan, Shōkin, T. Griffith Foulk, et al. Record of the Transmission of Illumination. Honolulu: University of Hawai’i Press, (vol. 1, pp. 1–74).
- Bodiford, William M. 2020. "Shamon Dōgen at Ninety". Annual Report of the Zen Institute, n.32 (2020.12), pp.59–86.
- Bodiford, William M. 2019. "Rewriting Dōgen". International Zen Studies, pp. 219–302. doi:10.34428/00012065
- Bodiford, William M. 2018. "Lives and Afterlives of Bushidō: A Perspective from Overseas". Asian Studies 6(2): University of Ljubljana, pp. 33–50. doi:10.4312/as.2018.6.2.33-50
- Bodiford, William M. 2018. “Anraku Ritsu: Genealogies of the Tendai Vinaya Revival in Early Modern Japan.” The Eastern Buddhist 49, 1 & 2. pp. 181–210. JSTOR 48711043
- Bodiford, William M. 2015. "Keizan’s Denkōroku: A Textual and Contextual Overview." In Steven Heine ed., Dōgen and Sōtō Zen. Oxford University Press, pp. 167–187.
- Bodiford, William M. 2012. "Remembering Dōgen: Eiheiji and Dōgen Hagiography". In Steven Heine ed., Dōgen: Textual and Historical Studies. Oxford University Press, pp. 207–222.
- Bodiford, William M. 2011. "The Rhetoric of Chinese Language in Japanese Zen." In Christoph Anderl ed., Zen Buddhist Rhetoric in China, Korea, and Japan, pp. 285–314. Brill.
- Bodiford, William M. 2010. "Zen and Esoteric Buddhism." In Orzech, Charles D. (ed). Esoteric Buddhism and the Tantras in Eastern Asia. Brill, pp. 924–935.
- Bodiford, William M. 2010. “The Monastic Institution in Medieval Japan – The Insider's View.” In Buddhist Monasticism in East Asia, edited by James A. Benn, Lori Meeks, and James Robson, 125–147, New York: Routledge.
- Bodiford, William M. 2008. "Dharma Transmission in Theory and Practice." In Steven Heine, Dale S. Wright ed., Zen Ritual: Studies of Zen Buddhist Theory in Practice. Oxford University Press, pp. 261–331.
- Bodiford, William M. 2006. "When Secrecy Ends: The Tokugawa Reformation of Tendai Buddhism.” In Bernhard Scheid, Mark Teeuwen ed., The Culture of Secrecy in Japanese Religion, Routledge, pp. 309–330.
- Bodiford, William M. 2006. "Koan Practice" In John D. Loori ed., Sitting with Koans: Essential Writings on Zen Koan Introspection, Wisdom Publications, pp. 77–96.
- Bodiford, William M. 2006. “Remembering Dōgen: Eiheiji and Dōgen Hagiography." The Journal of Japanese Studies, Volume 32, Number 1, pp. 1-21.
- Bodiford, William M. 2006. "Matara: A Dream King Between Insight and Imagination." Cahiers d'Extrême-Asie, Vol. 16, pp. 233–262. JSTOR 44171457
- Bodiford, William M. 2005. "Zen and Japanese Swordsmanship Reconsidered." In Alexander Bennett ed., Budo Perspectives. Auckland: Kendo World Publications, pp. 69–103.
- Bodiford, William M. 2005. "Bodhidharma's Precepts in Japan." In: Going Forth: Visions of Buddhist Vinaya. (Studies in East Asian Buddhism 18), University of Hawaii Press, pp. 185–209.
- Bodiford, William M. 2005. "A Chronology of Religion in Japan." In: Nanzan Guide to Japanese Religions, pp. 395–432.
- Bodiford, William M. 2005. "The Medieval Period – Eleventh to Sixteenth Centuries." In: Nanzan Guide to Japanese Religions, pp. 163–183.
- Bodiford, William M. 2003. "Monastic Militias." In Robert E. Buswell ed., Encyclopedia of Buddhism, Vol. 2 pp. 560–561. New York: Macmillan Reference.
- Bodiford, William M. 2002. "Soke: Historical Transformations of a Title and its Entitlements." In Diane Skoss ed., Keiko Shokon. Classical Warrior Traditions of Japan, vol. 3, pp.129–143. Also available on koryu.com
- Bodiford, William M. 2002. "Zen Buddhism." In Theodore A. Barry et al, ed., Sources of Japanese Tradition, Volume One: From Earliest Times to 1600, pp. 306–335.
- Bodiford, William M. 2001. "Written Texts: Japan." In Thomas A. Green, ed., Martial Arts of the World: An Encyclopedia Volume One: A–Q. Santa Barbara, Calif.: Abc-Clio.
- Bodiford, William M. 2001. "Religion and Spiritual Development: Japan." In Thomas A. Green, ed., Martial Arts of the World: An Encyclopedia Volume One: A–Q. Santa Barbara, Calif.: Abc-Clio, pp. 472–505.
- Bodiford, William M. 2000. "Emptiness and Dust – Zen Dharma Transmission Rituals." In David Gordon White, ed.,Tantra in Practice. Princeton University Press, pp. 299–307.
- Bodiford, William M. 1996. "Zen and the Art of Religious Prejudice. Efforts to Reform a Tradition of Social Discrimination." Japanese Journal of Religious Studies, 23 (1–2).
- Bodiford, William M. 1994. "Soto Zen in a Japanese Town – Field Notes on a Once-Every-Thirty-Three-Years Kannon Festival."Japanese Journal of Religious Studies 1994 21/1: 3–36.
- Bodiford, William M. 1993. "The Enlightenment of Kami and Ghosts – Spirit Ordinations in Japanese Sōtō Zen." Cahiers d'Extrême-Asie, pp. 267–282.
- Bodiford, William M. 1992. "Zen in the Art of Funerals: Ritual Salvation in Japanese Buddhism." History of Religions 32, no. 2: 146–164.
- Bodiford, William M. 1991. "Dharma Transmission in Sōtō Zen. Manzan Dōhaku's Reform Movement." Monumenta Nipponica, Vol. 46, no. 4: 423–451.
- Bodiford, William M. "Zen." Encyclopedia Britannica. https://www.britannica.com/topic/Zen.

Translations

- Foulk T. Griffith, William M Bodiford, Carl Bielefeldt, and John R McRae. 2021. Record of the Transmission of Illumination Volume 2: A Glossary of Terms, Sayings, and Names Pertaining to Keizan's Denkōroku. Honolulu: University of Hawaii Press.
- 瑩山 1268–1325 T. Griffith Foulk (ed), William M Bodiford (trans.), Sarah J Horton (trans.), Carl Bielefeldt (trans.), and John R McRae (trans.) 2021. Record of the Transmission of Illumination. Volume 1 an Annotated Translation of Zen Master Keizan's Denkōroku. Tokyo Honolulu: Sōtōshū Shūmuchō; University of Hawai'i Press. ISBN 9780824890001
- In Donald S. Lopez Jr. ed. 2004. Buddhist Scriptures :
- Kyōkai's “Karma Tales.” pp. 24–33
- Genshin's “Avoiding Hell, Gaining Heaven.” pp. 69–77
- “Taking the Vinaya Across the Sea.” pp. 306–317
- "Zen for National Defence." pp. 318–328
- "A Zen Master Interprets the Dharma: Bassui Tokushō (1327–1387)." pp. 531–539
- “Colloquial Transcriptions as Sources for Understanding Zen in Japan.", by Ishikawa Rikizan. The Eastern Buddhist, Vol. 34, No. 1, 2002.
- "Treasury of the Eye of the True Dharma – Book 31 – Not Doing Evils (Shoaku Makusa)", Dōgen's Shōbōgenzō. Introduction and translation by William M. Bodiford. Dharma Eye: News of Sōtō Zen Buddhism – Teachings and Practice. pp. 21–26, December 2002.
- "Kokan Shiren's “Zen Precept Procedures.” In Religions of Japan in Practice (1999) Chapter 8.
- "Keizan's “Dream History." in: Religions of Japan in Practice (1999) Chapter 44.
- "Chidō's Dreams of Buddhism." In Donald S. Lopez Jr. ed., Religions of Asia in practice: an anthology. Princeton University Press, pp. 649–659, 2002.
- Takuan Soho's “Marvelous Power of Immovable Wisdom." In Sources of Japanese Tradition, Volume 2: 1600 to 2000. Columbia University Press, pp. 527–531.

The Sōtō Zen Text Project

- Introduction to the Shōbōgenzō.” In Treasury of the True Dharma Eye: Dōgen's Shōbōgenzō, vol. 8, edited by Carl Bielefeldt.
