= Isshō =

- Gender: Male

Origin
- Origin: Japanese
- Meaning: Different meanings depending on the kanji used

Isshō, Issho or Isshou (written: 一笑 or 一照) is a masculine Japanese given name. Notable people with the name include:

- Isshō Fujita (藤田 一照; born 1954), Japanese Zen Buddhist
- Miyagawa Isshō (宮川 一笑; 1689–1780), Japanese painter
- Issho (One Piece), fictional character
