= Taigen Dan Leighton =

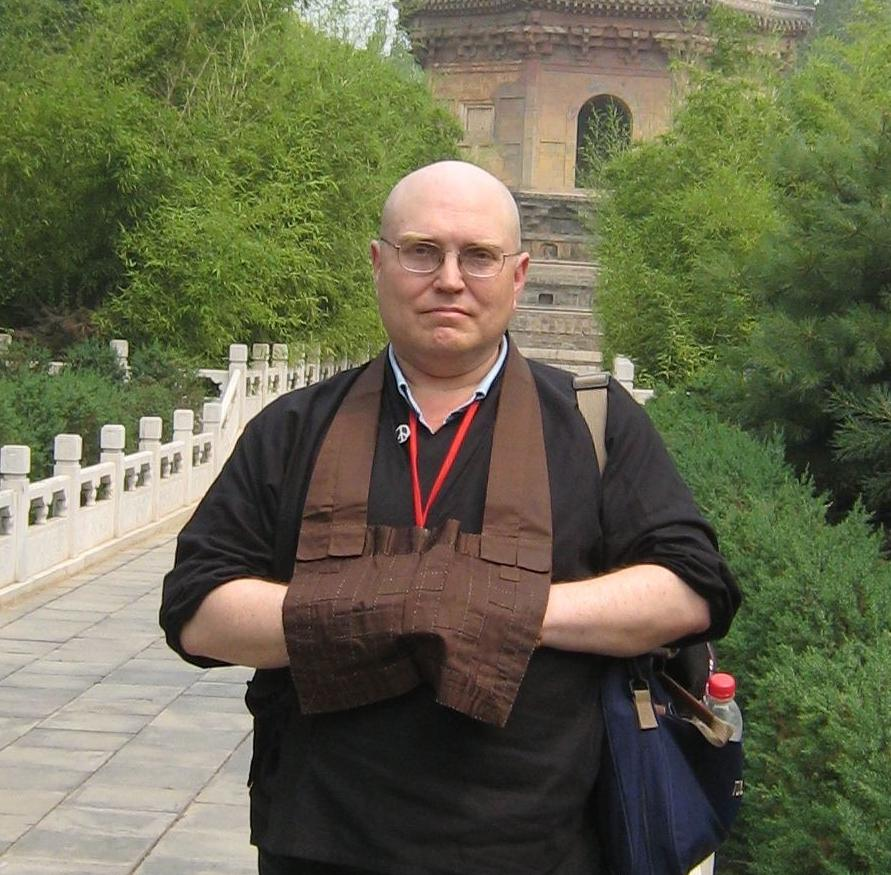

Personal life
- Education: Columbia University, B.A. California Institute of Integral Studies, M.A. Graduate Theological Union, Berkeley, Ph.D.
- Website: ancientdragon.org/taigen_dan_leigton

Religious life
- Religion: Sōtō
- Dharma name: Taigen Shizan

Senior posting
- Teacher: Kando Nakajima; Reb Anderson; Blanche Hartman
- Based in: Ancient Dragon Zen Gate; Loyola University Chicago; Institute of Buddhist Studies
- Predecessor: Reb Anderson
- Successor: Nyozan Eric Shutt, Eishin Nancy Easton

Taigen Dan Leighton (born 1950, grew up in Pittsburgh, PA) is a Sōtō priest and teacher, academic, and author. He is an authorized lineage holder and Zen teacher in the tradition of Shunryū Suzuki and is the founder and Guiding Teacher of Ancient Dragon Zen Gate in Chicago, Illinois. Leighton is also an authorized teacher in the Japanese Sōtō School (kyōshi).

== Biography ==
Leighton's father was a medical school professor and cancer researcher, his mother a high school French teacher and librarian. Leighton began his Zen practice in 1975 at the New York Zen Center, training under Kando Nakajima rōshi. He studied at Columbia University, where he obtained a bachelor's degree in East Asian studies. Leighton worked as a television and film editor in New York City, and then San Francisco.

In 1978, he moved to California and eventually became a resident at San Francisco Zen Center, where he worked at Tassajara Bakery and other of Zen Center's businesses. In subsequent years, Leighton practiced in residence at all of the San Francisco Zen Center facilities, including Green Gulch Farm Zen Center and Tassajara Zen Mountain Center. In 1986, Leighton was ordained as a priest by Reb Anderson in the latter's first ordination ceremony. In 1990 Leighton served as shuso (head monk) for the Spring practice period at Tassajara monastery under Zenkei Blanche Hartman as her first shuso.

Leighton lived in Japan from 1990–1992, translating Dōgen texts with Shōhaku Okumura and training under various masters. In 1994, Leighton founded the Mountain Source Sangha in Bolinas, San Rafael, and San Francisco, California (of which Ancient Dragon Zen Gate is a sister temple).

In 2000, Leighton received shihō, or Dharma transmission, from Reb Anderson.

He taught for four years at Loyola University Chicago and has taught since 1994 at the Institute of Buddhist Studies, part of the Berkeley Graduate Theological Union, from which Leighton has a Ph.D. degree.

Leighton has been involved in many interfaith dialogue programs, including conducting Buddhist–Christian dialogue workshops. He has long been active in various Engaged Buddhist programs for social justice, including Environmental and Peace activism. Leighton's peace activism goes back to dedicated anti-Vietnam War work in high school, and he was then as a College freshman arrested as part of the 1968 week-long building occupation at Columbia University protesting the War and racism.

In 2007 Leighton relocated to Chicago to serve full-time as Guiding Dharma Teacher for Ancient Dragon Zen Gate, which he had founded with students there a few years before. In 2008 Leighton performed Zuisse ceremonies at Eiheiji and Sōjiji temples in Japan to be recognized as a Dharma teacher by the Japanese Sōtō School. In 2019 Leighton completed Dharma transmission ceremonies at Ancient Dragon Zen Gate for his Dharma heirs Nyozan Eric Shutt and Eishin Nancy Easton.

== Professorships ==
Over the years, Leighton has taught at various universities around the world. The following is a complete list:

- Kansai University
- Ōtani University
- California Institute of Integral Studies
- University of San Francisco
- Saint Mary's College of California
- Institute of Buddhist Studies
- Loyola University Chicago
- Meadville Lombard Theological School

== Gallery ==
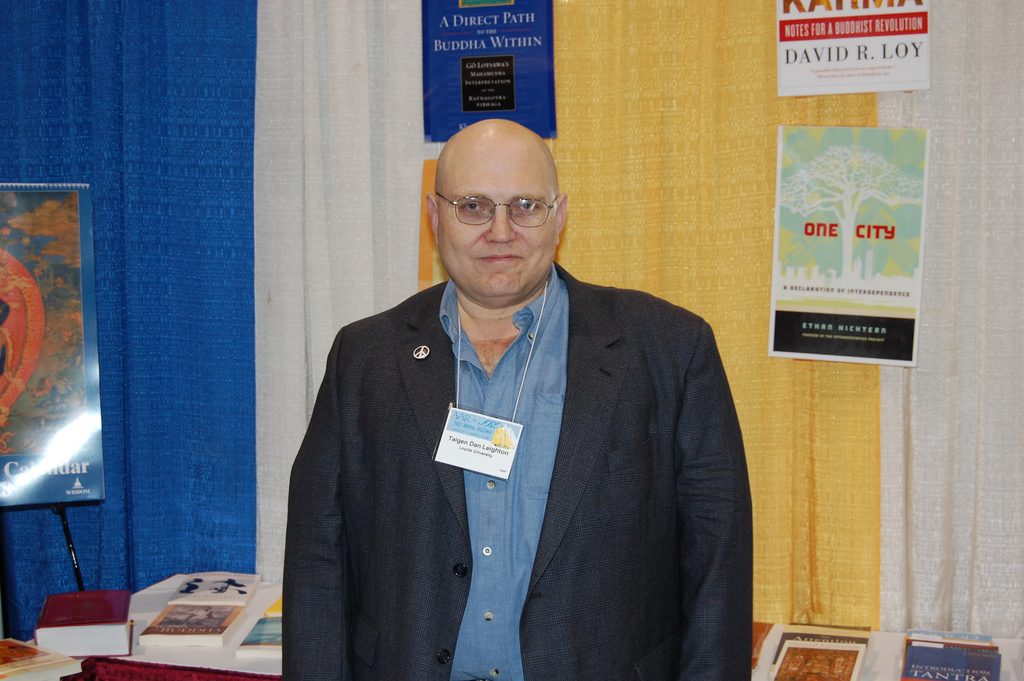

== Bibliography ==
- Leighton, Taigen Dan (2022) “Dōgen’s Vision of the Environment and his Practice of Devotion and Faith,” in Prebish, Charles S. and Ng, On-cho (eds.) The Theory and Practice of Zen Buddhism: A Festschrift in Honor of Steven Heine. Singapore, Springer. pp. 103-121. ISBN 978-981-16-8285-8
- Leighton, Taigen Dan (March 14, 2020). "Bob Dylan's Ongoing Critique of Social Injustice and Masters of War". Ancient Dragon Zen Gate.
- Leighton, Taigen Dan (2020) “Being Time and Deep Time” in Kaza, Stephanie (ed.) A Wild Love for the World: Joanna Macy and the Work of Our Time. Boston: Shambhala. pp. 226-235. ISBN 978-1-61180-795-0
- Leighton, Taigen Dan (2015). Just This Is It: Dongshan and the Practice of Suchness. Boston: Shambhala Publications. ISBN 978-1-61180-228-3.
- Leighton, Taigen Dan (2012). "Dogen's Approach to Training in Eihei Koroku". In Heine, Steven (ed.). Dogen: Textual And Historical Studies. New York: Oxford University Press. pp. 122–138. ISBN 978-0199754465. OCLC 731191960.
- Leighton, Taigen Dan (2012) [2003]. Faces of Compassion: Classic Bodhisattva Archetypes and Their Modern Expression—an Introduction to Mahayana Buddhism (Revised ed.). Boston: Wisdom Publications. ISBN 978-1614290148. OCLC 757476824.
- Leighton, Taigen Dan (2011). Zen Questions: Zazen, Dogen, and the Spirit of Creative Inquiry. Boston: Wisdom Publications. ISBN 978-0861716456. OCLC 713188144.
- Leighton, Taigen Dan (2010). "Dongshan and the Teaching of Suchness". In Heine, Steven; Wright, Dale Stuart (eds.). Zen Masters. New York: Oxford University Press. pp. 33–58. ISBN 978-0195367645. OCLC 426391158.
- Leighton, Taigen Dan (2009). "Now the Whole Planet Has Its Head on Fire". In Stanley, John; Loy, David; Dorje, Gyurme (eds.). A Buddhist Response to the Climate Emergency. Boston: Wisdom Publications. pp. 187–194. ISBN 978-0861716050. OCLC 298781881.
- Leighton, Taigen Dan (2008). "Zazen as an Enactment Ritual". In Heine, Steven; Wright, Dale Stuart (eds.). Zen Ritual: Studies of Zen Buddhist Theory in Practice. New York: Oxford University Press. pp. 167–184. ISBN 978-0195304671. OCLC 77573898.
- Leighton, Taigen Dan (2007). Visions of Awakening Space and Time: Dogen and the Lotus Sutra. Oxford; New York: Oxford University Press. ISBN 978-0195320930. OCLC 71350616.
- Leighton, Taigen Dan (2007). Songs for the True Dharma Eye: Verse Comments on Dogen's Shobogenzo. San Francisco, CA: Browser Books Publishing. ISBN 9780977221271.
- Payne, Richard Karl; Leighton, Taigen Dan, eds. (2006). Discourse and Ideology in Medieval Japanese Buddhism. Routledge Critical Studies in Buddhism. London; New York: Routledge. ISBN 0415359171. OCLC 59817941.
- Dōgen; Leighton, Taigen Dan; Shōhaku Okumura (2004). Dogen's Extensive Record: A Translation of the Eihei Koroku [永平広録]. Somerville, MA: Wisdom Publications. ISBN 0861713052. OCLC 55286286.
- Kim, Hee-Jin (2004) [1975]. Eihei Dogen: Mystical Realist (3rd ed.). Boston: Wisdom Publications. ISBN 0861713761. OCLC 53138715.
- Loori, John Daido (2004) [2002]. The Art of Just Sitting: Essential Writings on the Zen Practice of Shikantaza (2nd ed.). Boston: Wisdom Publications. ISBN 086171394X. OCLC 54392536.
- Warner, Jishō; Shōhaku Okumura; Leighton, Taigen Dan; McRae, John (2001). Nothing Is Hidden: Essays on Zen Master Dogen's Instructions for the Cook. New York: Weatherhill. ISBN 0834804786. OCLC 45488199.
- Leighton, Taigen Dan (2001). "Sacred Fools and Monastic Rules: Zen Rule-Bending and the Training for Pure Hearts". In Barnhart, Bruno; Huang, Yuese (eds.). Purity of Heart and Contemplation: A Monastic Dialogue Between Christian and Asian Traditions. New York: Continuum. pp. 151–164. ISBN 082641348X. OCLC 47136534.
- Leighton, Taigen Dan; Hongzhi Zhengjue (2000) [1991]. Cultivating the Empty Field: The Silent Illumination of Zen Master Hongzhi (Revised ed.). Boston: Tuttle Publishing. ISBN 0804832404. OCLC 43978646.
- Leighton, Taigen Dan (1998). Bodhisattva Archetypes: Classic Buddhist Guides to Awakening and Their Modern Expression. New York: Penguin Arkana. ISBN 0140195564. OCLC 37211178.
- Dōgen; Kōshō Uchiyama; Leighton, Taigen Dan; Shōhaku Okumura (1997). The Wholehearted Way: A Translation of Eihei Dogen's Bendowa [弁道話]. Boston: Tuttle Publishing. ISBN 080483105X. OCLC 38190728.
- Dōgen; Leighton, Taigen Dan; Shōhaku Okumura (1996). 永平清規 [Dogen's Pure Standards for the Zen Community: a Translation of the Eihei Shingi]. Albany, NY: State University of New York Press. ISBN 0791427102. OCLC 32859858.

== See also ==
- Buddhism in the United States
- Timeline of Zen Buddhism in the United States
