= Hōkyō-ji =

Buddhist temple in Fukui Prefecture, Japan

Coordinates: 35.0340°N 135.7526°E

Hōkyō-ji (宝慶寺) is a Sōtō Zen Buddhist temple founded about 1278 in Echizen, Fukui prefecture, Japan.

== History and founding ==
Jakuen left Eihei-ji in 1261. He meditated in solitary with the wild animals at the base of Mount Ginnanpo, about 25 kilometres (16 mi) away. By one account, a leader of the Fujiwara clan in charge of the Ono District, Ijira Tomotoshi happened to find him during a hunt, and offered his financial support. In 1278, Tomotoshi's son Tomanari built a temple for Jakuen who apparently wished to revere Ju-ching by taking the name from the Hōkyō era in China, a period during which Ju-ching was Dogen's teacher.

Giun, who was Jakuen's student and eventual Dharma heir, joined Hōkyō-ji in 1279, where he succeeded Jakuen as the abbot in 1299 for 15 years. Later Giun went to Eihei-ji for 18 years.

Keizan joined in 1282, when he became ino. Studying with Jakuen, Keizan experienced enlightenment at Hōkyō-ji in 1285.

== From the Hōkyō-ji treasure house ==
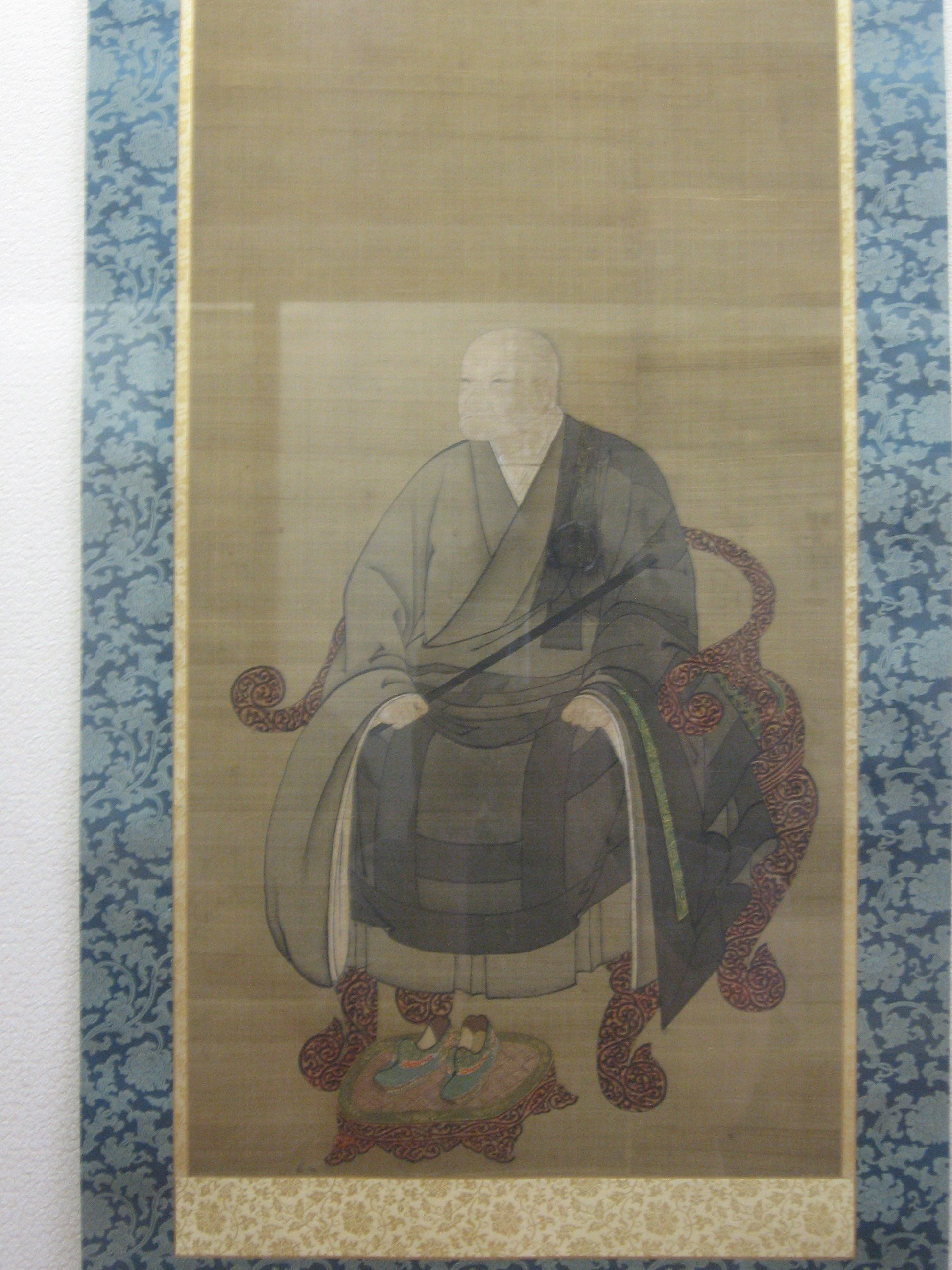
Jakuen, the founding abbot

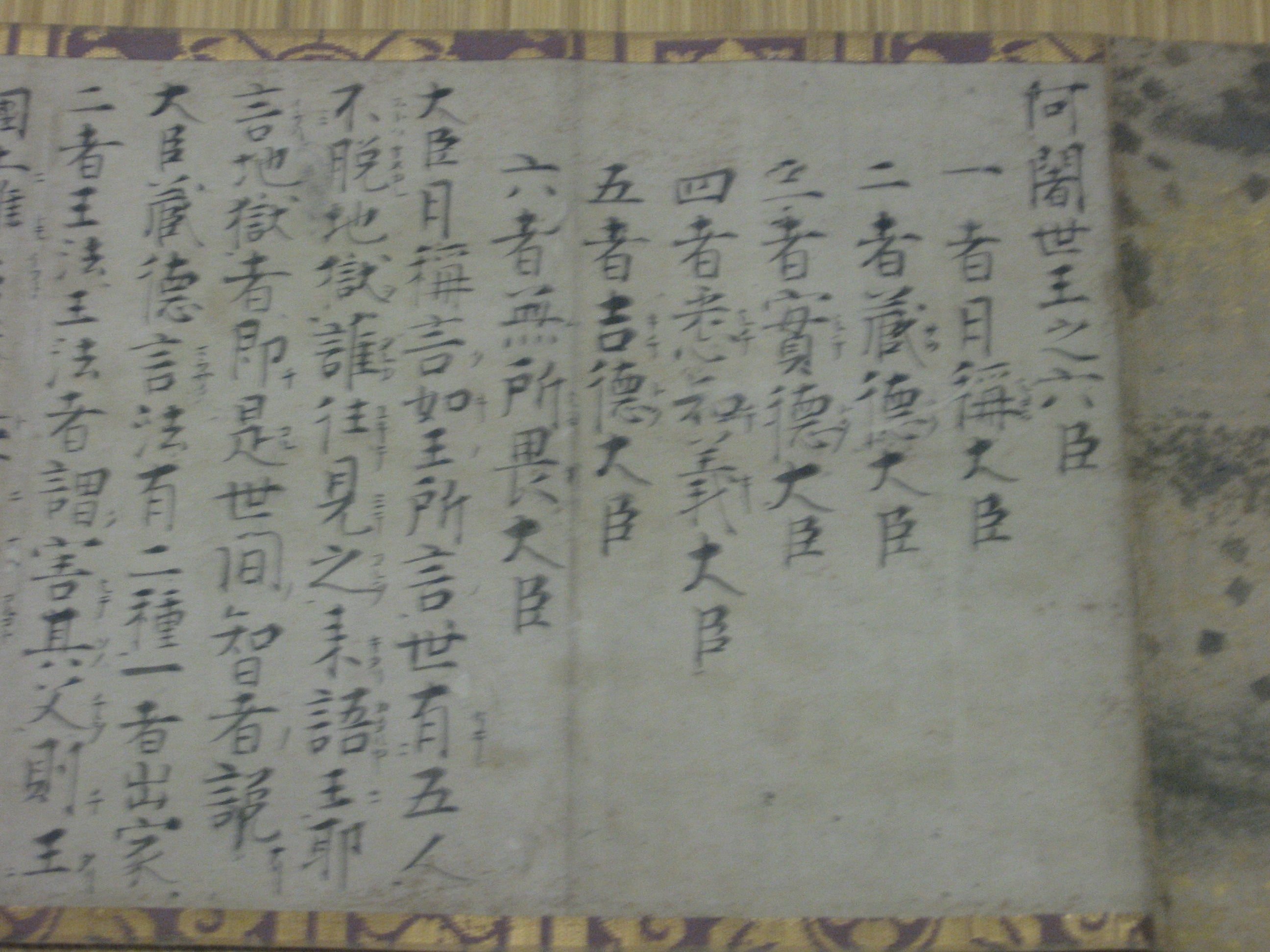
A text in Dogen's own hand

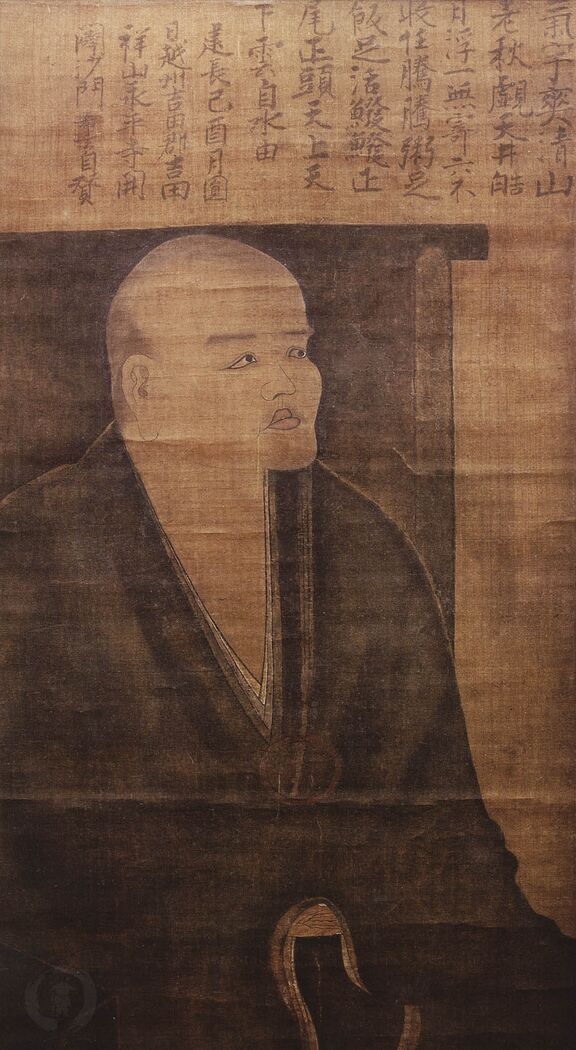
Dogen watching the moon

== Bibliography ==
- Bodiford, William M. (2008) [1993]. Sōtō Zen in Medieval Japan. University of Hawaii Press. ISBN 978-0824833039.
