= Shoryu Bradley =

Soto Zen priest

- Title: Priest

Personal life
- Education: University of Texas

Religious life
- Religion: Zen Buddhism
- School: Sōtō
- Lineage: Kodo Sawaki-Kosho Uchiyama

Senior posting
- Teacher: Shōhaku Okumura
- Based in: Gyobutsuji Zen Monastery

Shōryū Bradley (Japanese: 正竜ブラッドリー) is a Sōtō Zen priest and the founder and abbot of Gyobutsuji Zen Monastery located near Kingston, Arkansas.

== Biography ==
Shoryu Bradley studied psychology at Texas A&M University, where he received a B.S. He went on to graduate studies at the University of Texas and earned an M.Ed. in rehabilitation counseling. In 2002, Shoryu was ordained at Austin Zen Center by his teacher Seirin Barbara Kohn, where he practiced until 2004. In 2004, Shoryu went to study with Shōhaku Okumura at the Sanshin Zen Community in Bloomington, Indiana. He also visited and trained at Tassajara Zen Mountain Center near Monterey, California. He attended two Sōtōshū International Training angos, one at Shogo-ji in Kumamoto Prefecture, Japan. In 2010 Shoryu received dharma transmission from Okumura.

In 2011 Shoryu Bradley founded Gyobutsuji Zen Monastery in order to create a place for the practice of zazen in the United States similar to Antai-ji.

== Bibliography ==
- Okumura, Shohaku (2010), Bradley, Shoryu (ed.), Realizing Genjokoan: The Key to Dogen's Shobogenzo, Somerville, MA: Wisdom Publications, ISBN 978-0-86171-601-2, OCLC 531718920
- Bradley, Shoryu (2018), "Completely Receiving, Completely Releasing", in Okumura, Shohaku (ed.), Boundless Vows, Endless Practice: Bodhisattva Vows in the 21st Century, CreateSpace, ISBN 978-1986563284
