= Isshō Fujita =

Issho Fujita
- Title: Priest, Director

Personal life
- Born: April 18, 1954 (age 72) Niihama, Japan
- Education: Tokyo University, Doctoral chose
- Website: http://fujitaissho.info/

Religious life
- Religion: Zen Buddhism
- School: Sōtō
- Dharma name: Isshō

Senior posting
- Teacher: Kōhō Watanabe
- Based in: Hayama, Kanagawa

Isshō Fujita (藤田 一照, Fujita Isshō; b. 18 April 1954) was born in Niihama, Ehime, Japan and was head teacher at Valley Zendo, a Sōtō Zen practice center in Charlemont, Massachusetts, USA. Fujita had done studies in child psychology at Tokyo University Graduate School, but abandoned them and became a Zen monk. At the age of twenty-nine, on 8 December, Fujita was ordained a Zen priest, along with Ryōdō Yamashita, by Kōhō Watanabe at Antai-ji temple.

In 1987, Fujita assumed the role of abbot at Valley Zendo, where he lived until his return to Japan in 2005.

From 2010 to 2018, he was the Director of the Soto Zen International Center.

== See also ==
- Timeline of Zen Buddhism in the United States
