= Steven Heine =

American Zen Buddhist scholar

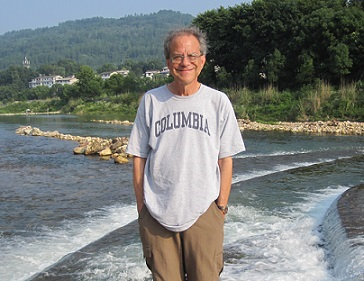
- Born: 1950 (age 75–76)
- Education: B.A. at the University of Pennsylvania; M.A. and Ph.D. at Temple University
- Occupations: Professor of Religious Studies and History; Director of Asian Studies
- Employer: Florida International University
- Organization: Asian Studies Program
- Known for: Studies in Zen Buddhist history and thought
- Website: religion.fiu.edu/people/faculty/heines.html

Steven Heine (born 1950), is a scholar in the field of Zen Buddhist history and thought, particularly the life and teachings of Zen Master Dōgen (1200–1253). He has also taught and published extensively on Japanese religion and society in worldwide perspectives.

== Teaching and research career ==
Heine lectured at Villanova University in Religious Studies from 1982 to 1987. In 1987, he became an assistant professor of religion at La Salle University and taught there until 1991 when he moved to Penn State University and became an associate professor of Religious Studies. He left Penn State University in 1997 to work as director of Florida International University's Asian Studies Program. Since his arrival at FIU, Heine has expanded Asian Studies and helped facilitate its growth at both the undergraduate and graduate levels. He is editor of the Japan Studies Review and a review editor for Philosophy East and West.

== White Collar Zen ==
Heine also runs the White Collar Zen project which examines use of the principles of Zen Buddhism in relation to the contemporary workplace and professional leadership issues. In addition to the book White Collar Zen: Using Zen Principles to Overcome Obstacles and Achieve Your Goal (2005), the project also includes a course on Asian Cultural Values in Business, first taught in 2006, sponsored by the Eugenio Pino Entrepreneurship Center at Florida International University, as well as workshops and conferences.

== Publications ==
Dogen Studies

- A Blade of Grass: Japanese Poetry and Aesthetics in Dōgen Zen (Peter Lang Publishing, 1989, ISBN 978-0-8204-0627-5)
- Did Dōgen Go to China? What He Wrote and When He Wrote It? (Oxford University Press, 2006, ISBN 978-0-19-530592-0)
- Dōgen: Japan’s Original Zen Teacher (Shambhala Publications, 2021, ISBN 978-1-61180-980-0)
- Dōgen and Sōtō Zen (Oxford University Press, 2015, ISBN 978-0-19-932486-6)
- Dōgen and the Kōan Tradition: A Tale of Two Shōbōgenzō Texts (SUNY, 1993, ISBN 978-0-7914-1773-7)
- Dōgen: Textual and Historical Studies (Oxford University Press, 2012, ISBN 978-0-19-975447-2)
- Existential and Ontological Dimensions of Time in Heidegger and Dōgen (SUNY, 1985, ISBN 978-0-88706-000-7)
- Flowers Blooming on a Withered Tree: Giun’s Verse Comments on Dōgen’s Shōbōgenzō (Oxford University Press, 2020, ISBN 978-0-19-094134-5)
- Readings in Dōgen’s Treasury of the True Dharma Eye (Columbia University Press, 2020, ISBN 978-0-231-18229-4)
- Wisdom Within Words: Translation with Comments of Dōgen’s Chinese Poetry (Oxford University Press, 2022, ISBN 978-0-19-755352-7)
- The Zen Poetry of Dōgen: Verses from the Mountain of Eternal Peace (Tuttle, 1997, ISBN 978-1-882795-20-8)

History and Thought of Zen Buddhism

- Approaches to Chan, Sŏn, and Zen Studies: Chinese Chan Buddhism and Its Spread throughout East Asia (SUNY series in Chinese Philosophy and Culture) (SUNY Press, 2022, ISBN 978-1-4384-9089-2, ASIN B0B1N6M85Q)
- Chan Rhetoric of Uncertainty in the Blue Cliff Record: Sharpening the Sword at the Dragon’s Gate (Oxford University Press, 2016, ISBN 978-0-19-939777-8)
- From Chinese Chan to Japanese Zen: A Remarkable Century of Transmission and Transformation (Oxford University Press, 2017, ISBN 978-0-19-063749-1)
- Like Cats and Dogs: Contesting the Mu Kōan in Zen Buddhism (Oxford University Press, 2013, ISBN 978-0-19-983730-4)
- Opening a Mountain: Kōans of the Zen Masters (Oxford University Press, 2003, ISBN 978-0-19-517434-2)
- Shifting Shape, Shaping Text: Philosophy and Folklore in the Fox Kōan (University of Hawai’i Press, 2000, ISBN 978-0-8248-2197-5)
- Zen and Material Culture (Oxford University Press, 2017, ISBN 978-0-19-046930-6)
- Zen Kōans (University of Hawai’i Press, 2014, ISBN 978-0-8248-3974-1)
- Zen Skin, Zen Marrow: Will the Real Zen Buddhism Please Stand Up? (Oxford University Press, 2007, ISBN 978-0-19-532677-2)

=== Asian Religion in Contemporary Culture: East & West ===
- A Dream Within a Dream: Studies in Japanese Thought (Peter Lang, 1991, ISBN 978-0-8204-1350-1)
- Bargainin’ For Salvation: Bob Dylan, A Zen Master? (Continuum, 2009, ISBN 978-0-8264-2950-6)
- Buddhism in the Modern World: Adaptations of an Ancient Tradition (Oxford University Press, 2003, ISBN 978-0-19-514698-1)
- Japan in Traditional and Postmodern Perspectives (SUNY, 1995, ISBN 978-0-7914-2469-8)
- Sacred High City, Sacred Low City: A Tale of Religious Sites in Two Tokyo Neighborhoods (Oxford University Press, 2011, ISBN 978-0-19-986144-6)
- White Collar Zen: Using Zen Principles to Overcome Obstacles and Achieve Your Career Goals (Oxford University Press, 2005, ISBN 978-0-19-516003-1)
- Xuedou’s 100 Odes to Old Cases: A Translation with Commentary (Oxford University Press, Forthcoming)

Co-Edited Series with Dale S. Wright

- The Kōan: Texts and Contexts in Zen Buddhism (Oxford University Press, 2000, ISBN 978-0-19-511749-3)
- The Zen Canon: Understanding the Classic Texts (Oxford University Press, 2004, ISBN 978-0-19-515068-1)
- Zen Classics: Formative Texts in the History of Zen Buddhism (Oxford University Press, 2005, ISBN 978-0-19-517525-7)
- Zen Ritual: Studies of Zen Buddhist Theory in Practice (Oxford University Press, 2007, ISBN 978-0-19-530468-8)
- Zen Masters (Oxford University Press, 2010, ISBN 978-0-19-536765-2)

=== Edited Books by Masao Abe ===
- A Study of Dōgen: His Philosophy and Religion (SUNY, 1991, ISBN 978-0-7914-0838-4)
- Buddhism and Interfaith Dialogue (University of Hawai’i Press, 1995, ISBN 978-0-8248-1752-7)
- Zen and Comparative Studies (University of Hawai’i Press, 1996, ISBN 978-0-8248-1832-6)
- Zen and the Modern World: A Third Sequel to Zen and Western Thought (University of Hawai’i Press, 2003, ISBN 978-0-8248-2665-9)

== Honors and awards ==
Heine is the recipient of the Order of the Rising Sun, Gold Rays with Rosette for his contribution to Japanese Studies.

A festschrift - as a tribute to honor Heine's contributions in the field of studies on Zen Buddhism - was published in 2022, with contributions of many of his colleagues.
