= Shōhaku Okumura =

Japanese Sōtō Zen priest and abbot

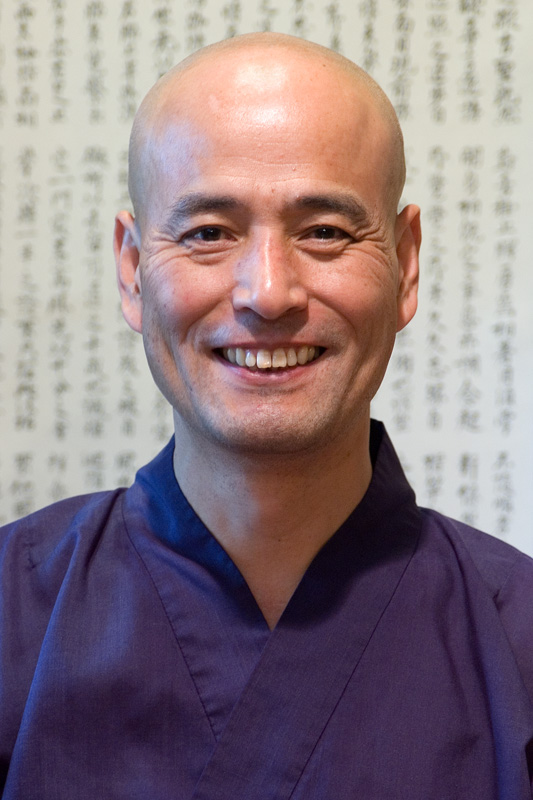
- Shōhaku Okumura in 2006
- Title: Priest

Personal life
- Born: June 22, 1948 (age 78) Osaka, Japan
- Spouse: Yūko Okumura
- Children: Yōko and Masaki
- Education: Komazawa University

Religious life
- Religion: Zen Buddhism
- School: Sōtō

Senior posting
- Based in: Sanshin Zen Community
- Predecessor: Kosho Uchiyama
- Successor: Hōkō Karnegis
- Students: Shōryū Bradley, Dōryu Cappelli, Kōshin Cherin, Chikō Corona, Gyōetsu Epifanìa, Hōkō Karnegis, Shōju Mahler, Denshō Quintero, Shōtai de la Rosa, Eidō Reinhart

Shōhaku Okumura (奥村 正博, born June 22, 1948) is a Japanese Sōtō Zen priest and the founder and abbot of the Sanshin Zen Community located in Bloomington, Indiana, where he and his family currently live. From 1997 until 2010, Okumura also served as director of the Sōtō Zen Buddhism International Center in San Francisco, California, which is an administrative office of the Sōtō school of Japan.

== Biography ==
Shōhaku Okumura was born in Osaka, Japan in 1948. He received his education at Komazawa University in Tokyo, Japan, where he studied Zen Buddhism. On December 8, 1970, Okumura was ordained at Antaiji by his teacher Kōshō Uchiyama, where he practiced until Uchiyama retired in 1975.

Following Uchiyama's wishes, Okumura traveled to the United States where he co-founded Valley Zendo in Massachusetts and continued Uchiyama's style of zazen practice there until 1981. In that year, he returned to Japan and began translating the writings of Uchiyama and Eihei Dōgen from Japanese into English. He spent some time teaching at Kyoto Sōtō Zen Center.

After returning to the United States, Okumura was a teacher at the Minnesota Zen Meditation Center in Minneapolis, Minnesota from 1993 to 1996 and then founded the Sanshin Zen Community in 1996.

Okumura's daughter, Yoko Okumura, made a short documentary film entitled Sit described as "a film about purpose in life, seen through the eyes of a Buddhist monk and his son." The film explores parts of Okumura's way of thinking, how his views affected his parenting and the results this had on Yoko and her brother Masaki, with a strong focus on Masaki.

== Teaching ==
Okumura attributes his desire to become a Buddhist to the discovery of a book while he was in high school called Self (自己, jiko) by Kōshō Uchiyama, who would become his teacher not long after. After Okumura became a teacher in his own right, his message remained much the same as Uchiyama's and is centered around the practice of zazen, largely to the exclusion of other rituals associated with the tradition. Okumura also focuses on the translation of the works of Eihei Dōgen and associated texts into English, as well as aiding his students in the study of such writings. His practice of zazen is built on what Uchiyama called "sesshin without toys". These sesshins of three, five, or seven days are completely silent and consist of fourteen hours of zazen each day, punctuated only by meals and sleep in the evening. There are no services, chants, or work periods. These alternate with "genzō-e retreats", which are five days of intensive study of one or more fascicles of Dōgen's collection of writings called the Shōbōgenzō. He has published several translations of material previously unavailable in English such as Dōgen’s Pure Standards for the Zen Community and Eihei Kōroku, both with Taigen Dan Leighton.

== Bibliography ==
- Uchiyama, Kosho (2018), Deepest Practice, Deepest Wisdom: Three Fascicles from Shobogenzo with Commentary, translated by Okumura, Shōhaku; Wright, Daitsu Tom, Somerville, MA: Wisdom Publications, ISBN 978-1614293026
- Okumura, Shohaku (2012), Living by Vow: A Practical Introduction to Eight Essential Zen Chants and Texts, Somerville, MA: Wisdom Publications, ISBN 978-1-61429-010-0, OCLC 760977623
- Bokusan, Nishiari; Shohaku Okumura; Shunryu Suzuki; Kosho Uchiyama; Sojun Mel Weitsman; Kazuaki Tanahashi; Dairyu Michael Wenger (2011). Dogen's Genjokoan: Three Commentaries. Berkeley, CA: Counterpoint. ISBN 978-1582437439. OCLC 693810221.
- Okumura, Shohaku (2010), Bradley, Shoryu (ed.), Realizing Genjokoan: The Key to Dogen's Shobogenzo, Somerville, MA: Wisdom Publications, ISBN 978-0-86171-601-2, OCLC 531718920
- Leighton, Taigen Dan; Shohaku Okumura (2004). Dogen's Extensive Record: A Translation of the Eihei Koroku. Somerville, MA: Wisdom Publications. ISBN 978-0-86171-305-9. OCLC 55286286.
- Uchiyama, Kosho; Thomas Wright; Jishō Cary Warner; Shohaku Okumura (2004). Opening the Hand of Thought: Foundations of Zen Buddhist Practice. Boston: Wisdom Publications. ISBN 978-0-86171-357-8. OCLC 54670173.
- Okumura, Shohaku, ed. (2003). Dogen Zen and its Relevance for Our Time: An International Symposium Held in Celebration of the 800th Anniversary of the Birth of Dogen Zenji, Stanford University, October 23–24, 1999. San Francisco, CA: Sōtō Zen Buddhism International Center.
- Warner, Jisho Cary; Shohaku Okumura; Taigen Dan Leighton; John McRae (2001). Nothing is Hidden : Essays on Zen Master Dogen's Instructions for the Cook. New York: Weatherhill. ISBN 978-0-8348-0478-4. OCLC 45488199.
- Okumura, Shohaku; Taigen Dan Leighton (1997). The Wholehearted Way: A Translation of Eihei Dogen's Bendowa. Boston: Tuttle Publishing. ISBN 978-0-8048-3105-5. OCLC 38190728.
- Leighton, Taigen Dan; Shohaku Okumura (1996). Pure Standards for the Zen Community: A Translation of the Eihei Shingi. Albany, NY: SUNY Press. ISBN 978-0-585-04623-5. OCLC 42854986.
- Okumura, Shohaku (1990). Shobogenzo Zuimonki: Sayings of Eihei Dogen Zenji. Kyoto, Japan: Kyoto Sōtō-Zen Center. OCLC 215148008.
- Uchiyama, Kosho; trans. Koshi Ichida; Marshall Mittnick; George Vavares; Shohaku Okumura (1990). The Zen Teaching of Homeless Kodo. Kyoto, Japan: Kyoto Sōtō-Zen Center. OCLC 483376397.
- Okumura, Shohaku (1988). Dogen Zen. Kyoto, Japan: Kyoto Sōtō-Zen Center. OCLC 29269397.
- Okumura, Shohaku (1985). Shikantaza: An Introduction to Zazen. Kyoto, Japan: Kyoto Sōtō-Zen Center. OCLC 18308720.

== See also ==
- Buddhism in Japan
- Buddhism in the United States
- Timeline of Zen Buddhism in the United States
