= Kōshō Uchiyama =

Sōtō priest, origami master, and abbot

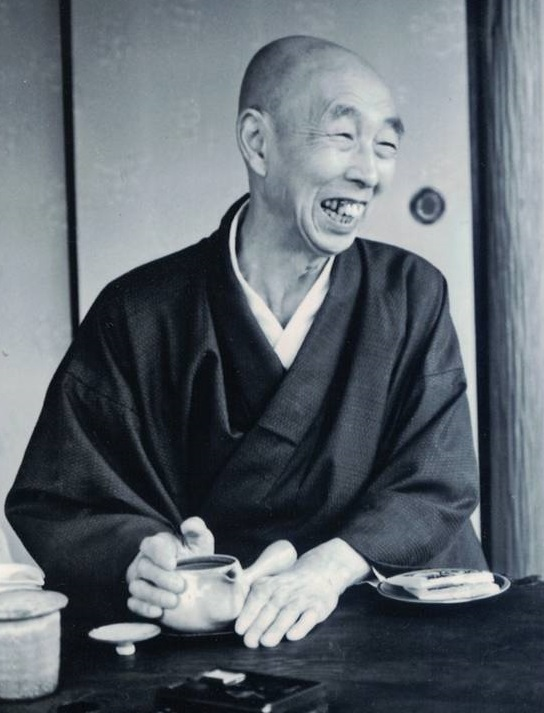
- Uchiyama preparing tea
- Title: Rōshi

Personal life
- Born: 1912 Tokyo, Japan
- Died: March 1998 (aged 85–86)
- Education: M.A. (Waseda Univ.)

Religious life
- Religion: Zen Buddhism
- School: Sōtō

Senior posting
- Based in: Antai-ji
- Predecessor: Kodo Sawaki
- Successor: Koho Watanabe; Shohaku Okumura; Joichi Yamamoto; Shusoku Kushiya

Kosho Uchiyama (内山 興正, Uchiyama Kōshō; 1912 – March 13, 1998) was a Sōtō Zen monk, origami master, and abbot of Antai-ji near Kyoto, Japan.

Uchiyama was author of more than twenty books on Zen Buddhism and origami, of which the best known in the Western World are Opening the Hand of Thought: Foundations of Zen Buddhist Practice and How to Cook Your Life: From the Zen Kitchen to Enlightenment.

== Education and career ==
Uchiyama graduated from Waseda University with a master's degree in Western philosophy in 1937 and was ordained a priest in 1941 by his teacher Kōdō Sawaki. Throughout his life, Uchiyama lived with the damaging effects of tuberculosis.

Uchiyama became abbot of Antai-ji following Sawaki's death in 1965 until he retired in 1975 to Nokei-in, also near Kyoto, where he lived with his wife. Following the death of his teacher he led a forty-nine-day sesshin in memorial of his teacher. In retirement he continued his writing, the majority of which consisted of poetry.

== Opening the Hand of Thought ==
Opening the Hand of Thought, first published in English in 1993 by Arkana Press, was edited by Jishō Cary Warner, and translated by Daitsū Tom Wright and Uchiyama's Dharma heir Shohaku Okumura. Portions of the book first appeared in a different English language translation in the author's Approach to Zen: The Reality of Zazen, Japan Publications, 1973. The book attempts a straightforward and practical description of Zen, with an emphasis on the practice of zazen, and uses comparisons of Buddhism and Christianity as a way for westerners to understand Uchiyama's approach

His summary is:

"one zazen, two practices, three minds"

which refers to his own formula: two practices of "vow" and "repentance", and three minds: "magnanimous mind, nurturing mind and joyful mind". He says his book covers butsudō, the effort of an individual to actualize their universal self.

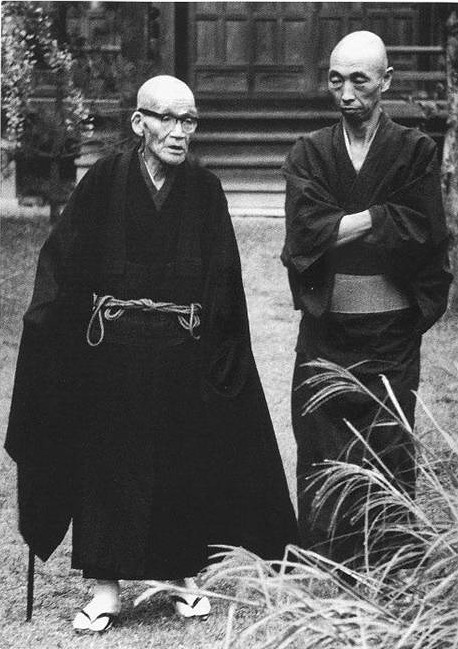
Uchiyama with his teacher Sawaki Roshi at Antai-ji in Kyoto

== Bibliography ==
- Uchiyama, Kosho (2025). The Sound that Perceives the World: Calling Out to the Bodhisattva. ISBN 978-1614299516.
- Uchiyama, Kosho (2025). The Roots of Goodness: Zen Master Dogen's Teaching on the Eight Qualities of a Great Person. ISBN 978-1645473312.
- Uchiyama, Kosho (2018). Deepest Practice, Deepest Wisdom: Three Fascicles from Shobogenzo with Commentary. ISBN 978-1614293026.
- Uchiyama, Kosho (2014). The Zen Teaching of 'Homeless Kodo. ISBN 978-1614290483.
- Uchiyama, Kosho (2008): Das Leben meistern durch Zazen. Angkor Verlag. ISBN 978-3-936018-56-1.
- Uchiyama, Kosho; Sawaki, Kodo (2007): Die Zen-Lehre des Landstreichers Kodo. Angkor Verlag. ISBN 978-3-936018-51-6.
- Uchiyama, Kosho; Dogen; François-Albert Viallet (2007). Zen für Küche und Leben: Kommentare zu zen-meister Dogens Tenzo Kyokun – Anweisungen für den Koch. Angkor Verlag. ISBN 978-3-936018-55-4. OCLC 180743143.
- Uchiyama, Kosho (2007). Shōbō genzō hachidainingaku o ajiwau. Tokyo: Daihōrinkaku. ISBN 978-4-8046-1263-8. OCLC 212862710.
- Uchiyama, Kosho (2005). How to Cook Your Life: From the Zen Kitchen to Enlightenment. ISBN 978-1590302910.
- Uchiyama, Kosho; Jōichi Yamamoto (2005). Fukan zazengi o yomu : shūkyō to shiteno dōgenzen. Tokyo: Daihōrinkaku. ISBN 4-8046-1223-8. OCLC 76932031.
- Uchiyama, Kosho; Thomas Wright; Jishō Cary Warner; Shohaku Okumura (2004). Opening the Hand of Thought: Foundations of Zen Buddhist Practice. Wisdom Publications. ISBN 0-86171-357-5. OCLC 54670173.
- Uchiyama, Kosho (2000). Uvolnit sevření mysli: cesta k zenu. Praha: DharmaGaia. ISBN 80-85905-51-5. OCLC 84999536.
- Uchiyama, Kosho; Dogen; Shohaku Okumura; Taigen Daniel Leighton (1997). The Wholehearted Way: A Translation of Eihei Dogen's Bendowa. Tuttle Publishing. ISBN 0-8048-3105-X. OCLC 38190728.
- Uchiyama, Kosho (1989). Shōbō genzō gyōbutsu igi o ajiwau. Tokyo: Hakujusha. OCLC 23385648.
- Uchiyama, Kosho (1987). Shōbō genzō genjō kōan o ajiwau. Tokyo: Hakujusha. OCLC 18049880.
- Uchiyama, Kosho (1987). Inochi no hataraki : Chiji shingi o ajiau : shinsōban. Tokyo: Hakujusha. OCLC 22847500.
- Uchiyama, Kosho (1984). Shōbō genzō : uji shoaku makusa o ajiwau. Tōkyo: Hakujusha, Shōwa 59. OCLC 15414544.
- Uchiyama, Kosho (1983). Refining Your Life: From the Zen Kitchen to Enlightenment. Weatherhill. ISBN 0-8348-0179-5. OCLC 8928810.
- Uchiyama, Kosho; Dogen (1977). Shūkyō to shite no Dōgen Zen : Fukan zazengi ikai. Tokyo: Hakujusha. OCLC 42589281.
- Uchiyama, Kosho (1974). Réalité du Zen. Le chemin vers soi-même. Le Courrier du Livre. OCLC 32455013.
- Uchiyama, Kosho (1973). Approach to Zen: The Reality of Zazen/Modern Civilization and Zen. Japan Publications. ISBN 0-87040-252-8.
- Uchiyama, Kosho (1973). Weg zum Selbst: Zen-wirklichkeit. Barth. ISBN 3-87041-265-8. OCLC 34673388.
- Uchiyama, Kosho (1967). Modern Civilization and Zen: What Kind of Religion is Buddhism?. Administrative Office of Soto Sect. OCLC 38666101.
- Uchiyama, Kosho (1962). Origami. Tokyo: Kokudosha. OCLC 33721581.

== Sources ==
- Ford, James Ishmael (2006), Zen Master Who?: A Guide to the People and Stories of Zen, Wisdom Publications, ISBN 0-86171-509-8
- Uchiyama, Kosho; Wright, Thomas; Warner, Jishō; Okumura, Shohaku (2004), Opening the Hand of Thought: Foundations of Zen Buddhist Practice, Wisdom Publications, ISBN 0-86171-357-5, OCLC 54670173
- Wright, Daitsu Tom; Warner, Jishō (March 1, 2006), "Laughter Through the Tears: Kosho Uchiyama Roshi on Life as a Zen Beggar", Lion's Roar
