= Norman Waddell =

American translator of Japanese Zen texts

- Born: Norman A. Waddell; 1940 (age 85–86); Washington, D.C., U.S.
- Occupations: Translator, scholar
- Writing career
- Language: English
- Subjects: Zen Buddhism; Hakuin Ekaku; Bankei Yōtaku; Dōgen; Baisaō; R. H. Blyth

Norman A. Waddell (born 1940) is an American translator of Japanese Zen Buddhist texts. He is best known for translations of the eighteenth-century Rinzai master Hakuin Ekaku, published over three decades. He has also translated Bankei Yōtaku, Dōgen, Baisaō, and D. T. Suzuki, and edited the letters and uncollected writings of R. H. Blyth. Waddell taught English literature and international studies at Otani University in Kyoto for more than thirty years.

== Life ==
Waddell was born in Washington, D.C., in 1940, and was drawn to Japan by the writings of D. T. Suzuki and of Suzuki's protégé R. H. Blyth. He joined the faculty of Otani University, a Shin Buddhist university in Kyoto, where he taught for over three decades. By 1972 he was a lecturer in English literature there and one of six associate editors of The Eastern Buddhist, the English-language journal of the Eastern Buddhist Society that Suzuki had founded. He was later an associate professor of English literature, and by the early 2000s a professor in Otani's Department of International Studies; he then sat on the journal's advisory board. He has since retired.

== Works ==
Much of Waddell's work first appeared serially in The Eastern Buddhist before being revised for book publication.

=== D. T. Suzuki ===
Waddell's first book-length translation was Suzuki's Nihonteki reisei (1944), published in English as Japanese Spirituality in 1972 by the Japan Society for the Promotion of Science for the Japanese National Commission for UNESCO. Greenwood Press reprinted it in 1988 in its series Classics of Modern Japanese Thought and Culture.

=== Dōgen ===
From 1971 Waddell and Masao Abe published annotated translations of Dōgen's Fukanzazengi and of fascicles of the Shōbōgenzō, including Bendōwa, Genjōkōan, Busshō, Zenki and Shōji, in The Eastern Buddhist. Revised versions were collected as The Heart of Dōgen's Shōbōgenzō (SUNY Press, 2002).

=== Bankei ===
The Unborn: The Life and Teachings of Zen Master Bankei, 1622–1693 was published by North Point Press in 1984, drawing on translations first serialized in The Eastern Buddhist. A revised and expanded edition with additional talks and dialogues appeared in 2000.

=== Hakuin ===
Waddell's Hakuin translations began with a serialized version of the Sokkō-roku kaien fusetsu, Hakuin's introductory lectures on the records of the Chinese master Xutang, in The Eastern Buddhist (1985–1991), published by Shambhala in 1994 as The Essential Teachings of Zen Master Hakuin.

It was followed by Hakuin's commentary on the Heart Sutra (Zen Words for the Heart, 1996) and his late autobiographical work Itsumadegusa (Wild Ivy, 1999).

In 2009 Counterpoint Press published two further volumes: Hakuin's Precious Mirror Cave, a miscellany of shorter works most of which had not previously been translated, together with Tōrei Enji's chronological biography of Hakuin; and Waddell's translation of Katsuhiro Yoshizawa's The Religious Art of Zen Master Hakuin. Beating the Cloth Drum (Shambhala, 2012) collects twenty-eight of Hakuin's letters with commentary.

His largest undertaking was the Keisō dokuzui, Hakuin's formal teaching record. A selection covering just over half the text appeared in 2014 as Poison Blossoms from a Thicket of Thorn, and the complete translation, with annotations drawn from copies inscribed by Hakuin's students, followed in 2017.

In 2024 Shambhala published Waddell's translation of Yamada Mumon's 1962 commentary on Hakuin's Song of Zazen (Zazen wasan), with a foreword by Suzuki.

=== Baisaō ===
Waddell first published a study of Baisaō, the eighteenth-century Ōbaku monk who sold tea in the streets of Kyoto, in The Eastern Buddhist in 1984. His book The Old Tea Seller: Life and Zen Poetry in 18th Century Kyoto (Counterpoint, 2008) combines a biography with translations of nearly all of Baisaō's verse, prose and letters. The tea writer James Norwood Pratt credited Waddell with making Baisaō, a key figure in the popularization of sencha, readable in English for the first time.

=== R. H. Blyth ===
Waddell gathered the letters and uncollected writings of R. H. Blyth, drawing on correspondence supplied by Blyth's friend Dora Lord and by Robert Aitken. He also corresponded with J. D. Salinger. The collection appeared in 2022 as Poetry and Zen.

== Reception ==
In a review of Poison Blossoms in Tricycle, Kurt Spellmeyer wrote that Waddell had "probably done more than anyone else to bring Hakuin to North American readers".

== Selected works ==
=== Translations ===
- Suzuki, Daisetz. Japanese Spirituality. Tokyo: Japan Society for the Promotion of Science, 1972.
- Bankei. The Unborn: The Life and Teachings of Zen Master Bankei, 1622–1693. San Francisco: North Point Press, 1984; rev. ed. 2000.
- Hakuin. The Essential Teachings of Zen Master Hakuin: A Translation of the Sokkō-roku Kaien-fusetsu. Boston: Shambhala, 1994. ISBN 0-87773-972-2.
- Hakuin. Zen Words for the Heart: Hakuin's Commentary on the Heart Sutra. Boston: Shambhala, 1996. ISBN 1-57062-165-9.
- Hakuin. Wild Ivy: The Spiritual Autobiography of Zen Master Hakuin. Boston: Shambhala, 1999.
- Dōgen (with Masao Abe). The Heart of Dōgen's Shōbōgenzō. Albany: SUNY Press, 2002.
- Baisaō. The Old Tea Seller: Life and Zen Poetry in 18th Century Kyoto. Berkeley: Counterpoint, 2008.
- Hakuin. Hakuin's Precious Mirror Cave: A Zen Miscellany. Berkeley: Counterpoint, 2009.
- Hakuin (with Yoshizawa, Katsuhiro). The Religious Art of Zen Master Hakuin. Berkeley: Counterpoint, 2009.
- Hakuin. Beating the Cloth Drum: The Letters of Zen Master Hakuin. Boston: Shambhala, 2012.
- Hakuin. Poison Blossoms from a Thicket of Thorn. Berkeley: Counterpoint, 2014.
- Yamada Mumon. Hakuin's Song of Zazen: Yamada Mumon Rōshi on Zen Practice. Boulder: Shambhala, 2024. ISBN 978-1-64547-181-3.

=== As editor ===
- Blyth, R. H. Poetry and Zen: Letters and Uncollected Writings of R. H. Blyth. Boulder: Shambhala, 2022.
