= Gyōbutsu igi =

Book by monk Eihei Dōgen

Gyōbutsu igi (Japanese: 行佛威儀), known in English as Dignified Behavior of the Practice Buddha, is a book of the Shōbōgenzō by the 13th century Sōtō Zen monk Eihei Dōgen. It was written in the winter of 1241 at Dōgen's monastery Kōshōhōrin-ji in Kyoto. The book appears as the sixth book in both the 75 and 60 fascicle versions of the Shōbōgenzō, and it is ordered 23rd in the later chronological 95 fascicle Honzan editions. Dōgen discusses similar concepts in two of his formal Dharma Hall Discourses, namely number 119, which was written shortly after Gyōbutsu igi, and number 228, both of which are recorded in the Eihei Kōroku. The title is a quotation from the final chapter of Buddhabhadra's translation of the Avataṃsaka Sūtra (which also circulated independently as the Gaṇḍavyūha Sutra) where the phrase was used to simply describe the Buddha, "bearing himself as a Buddha." Dōgen substantially reimagines the meaning of the phrase in this fascicle.

Gudō Nishijima, a modern Zen priest, provides the following analysis for this book: "Buddhism can be called a religion of action. Buddhism esteems action very highly, because action is our existence itself, and without acting we have no existence. Gautama Buddha's historical mission was to find the truth of action, by which he could synthesize idealistic Brahmanism and the materialistic theories of the six non-Buddhist teachers. In this chapter, Master Dōgen explained the dignity that usually accompanies buddhas in action." Dōgen also uses the book to reiterate his conviction that practice and awakening are not separate, writing, "Know that buddhas in the Buddha way do not wait for awakening". Taigen Dan Leighton, also a Zen priest and scholar, writing about Gyōbutsu igi, notes, "For Dōgen, buddhahood is not some one-time attainment to be cherished thereafter but an ongoing vital process, requiring continued reawakening".

Gyobutsuji Zen Monastery in the U.S. state of Arkansas is named for this chapter of the Shōbōgenzō.
