= Uji (Being-Time) =

Coinage of Sōtō Zen founder Dōgen

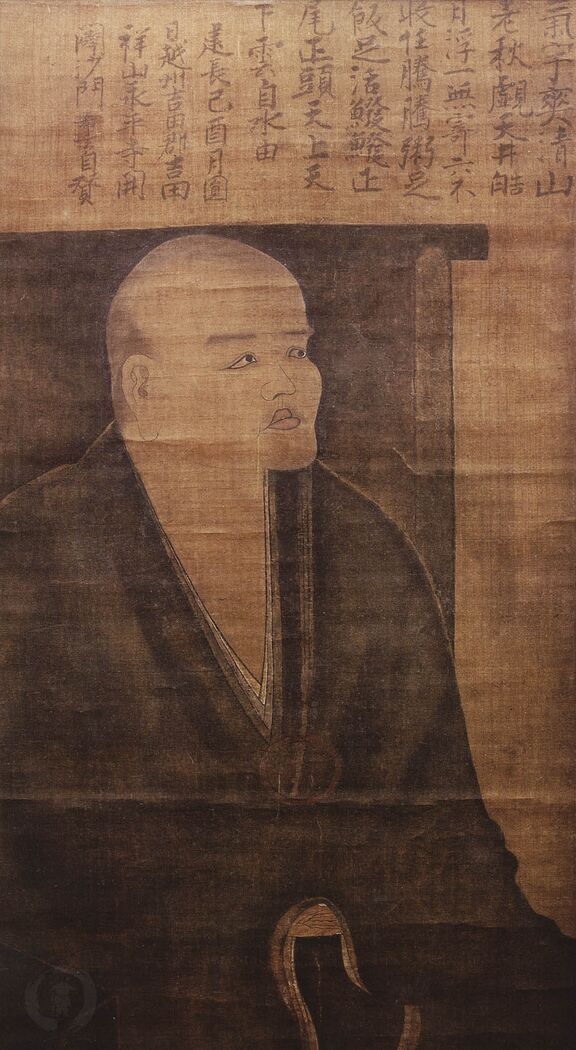
- Painting of Dōgen viewing the moon, c. 1250, Hōkyōji monastery collection.

Chinese name
- Chinese: 有時
- Literal meaning: exist/be/have time
Transcriptions
Standard Mandarin
- Hanyu Pinyin: yǒushí
- Wade–Giles: yu-shih
Hakka
- Romanization: yû-sṳ̀
Yue: Cantonese
- Jyutping: jau^{5} si^{4}
Middle Chinese
- Middle Chinese: ɦɨuX d͡ʑɨ

Vietnamese name
- Vietnamese: hữu thời

Korean name
- Hangul: 유시
- Hanja: 有時
Transcriptions
- Revised Romanization: yusi
- McCune–Reischauer: yusi

Japanese name
- Kanji: 有時
- Hiragana: うじ
- Katakana: ウジ
Transcriptions
- Revised Hepburn: uji

The Japanese Buddhist word uji (有時), usually translated into English as Being-Time, is a key metaphysical idea of the Sōtō Zen founder Dōgen (1200–1253). His 1240 essay titled Uji, which is included as a fascicle in the Shōbōgenzō ("Treasury of the True Dharma Eye") collection, gives several explanations of uji, beginning with, "The so-called "sometimes" (uji) means: time (ji) itself already is none other than being(s) (u) are all none other than time (ji)." Scholars have interpreted uji "being-time" for over seven centuries. Early interpretations traditionally employed Buddhist terms and concepts, such as impermanence (Pali anicca, Japanese mujō 無常). Modern interpretations of uji are more diverse, for example, authors like Steven Heine and Joan Stambaugh compare Dōgen's concepts of temporality with the existentialist Martin Heidegger's 1927 Being and Time.

== Terminology ==
Dōgen's writings can be notoriously difficult to understand and translate, frequently owing to his wordplay with Late Middle Japanese terms. Dōgen's Zen neologism uji (有時, "existence-/being-time") is the uncommon on'yomi Sino-Japanese reading of the Chinese word yǒushí (有時, "sometimes; at times", Wenlin 2016), and plays with the more common kun'yomi native Japanese pronunciation of these two kanji characters as arutoki (或る時, "once; on one occasion; at one point; [in the past] once; at one time; once upon a time". In the multifaceted Japanese writing system, arutoki ("at one time; etc.") was archaically transcribed 有時 in kanbun ("Chinese character writing"), and is now either written 或る時 with -ru る in okurigana indicating a Group II verb stem, or simply あるとき in hiragana. Authors have described Dōgen's uji as an "intentional misreading" of ordinary language and a "deliberate misreading" of arutoki.

Dōgen etymologizes the two components of uji (有時) with usage examples from everyday Japanese. The first element u refers to "existence" or "being", and the second ji means "time; a time; times; the time when; at the time when; sometime; for a time". Several of Dōgen's earlier writings used the word arutoki, for example, in a kōan story, it repeatedly means "and then, one day" to signal that an important event is about to happen.

Interpretations of uji are plentiful. Dainin Katagiri says that Dōgen used the novel term being-time to illustrate that sentient "beings" and "time" were unseparated. Thus, being represents all beings existing together in the formless realm of timelessness, and time characterizes the existence of independent yet interconnected moments. Gudo Nishijima and Chodo Cross say, u means "existence" and ji means "time," so uji means "existent time," or "existence-time." Since time is always related with existence and existence is always related with momentary time, the past and the future are not existent time—the point at which existence and time come together—the present moment is the only existent time.

The Japanese keyword uji has more meanings than any single English rendering can encompass. Nevertheless, translation equivalents include:

- Existence/Time
- Being-Time
- Being Time
- Time-Being
- Just for the Time Being, Just for a While, For the Whole of Time is the Whole of Existence.
- Existence-Time
- Existential moment

== Shōbōgenzō fascicle ==
Dôgen wrote his Uji essay at the beginning of winter in 1240, while he was teaching at the Kōshōhōrin-ji, south of Kyoto. It is one of the major fascicles of Shôbôgenzô, and "one of the most difficult". Dôgen's central theme in Uji Being-Time, and an underlying theme in other fascicles such as Busshō (佛性, Buddha Nature), is the inseparability of time and existence in the everchanging present.

The present Shōbōgenzō fascicle (number 20 in the 75 fascicle version) commences with a poem (four two-line stanzas) in which every line begins with uji (有時). The 1004 The Jingde Record of the Transmission of the Lamp collection of hagiographies for Chinese Chan and Japanese Zen monks attributes the first stanza to the Sōtō Zen Tang dynasty patriarch Yaoshan Weiyan (745-827).

An old Buddha said:
For the time being, I stand astride the highest mountain peaks.
For the time being, I move on the deepest depths of the ocean floor.
For the time being, I'm three heads and eight arms [of an Asura fighting demon].
For the time being, I'm eight feet or sixteen feet [a Buddha-body while seated or standing].
For the time being, I'm a staff or a whisk.
For the time being, I'm a pillar or a lantern.
For the time being, I'm Mr. Chang or Mr. Li [any Tom, Dick, or Harry].
For the time being, I'm the great earth and heavens above..

The translators note their choice of "for the time being" attempts to encompass Dōgen's wordplay with uji "being time" meaning arutoki "at a certain time; sometimes".

Compare these other English translations of the first stanza:

Sometimes (uji) standing so high up on the mountain top;
Sometimes walking deep down on the bottom of the sea;
For the time being stand on top of the highest peak.
For the time being proceed along the bottom of the deepest ocean.
At a time of being, standing on the summit of the highest peak;
At a time of being, walking on the bottom of the deepest ocean.
Standing atop a soaring mountain peak is for the time being
And plunging down to the floor of the Ocean's abyss is for the time being;
Being-time stands on top of the highest peak;
Being-time goes to the bottom of the deepest ocean
Sometimes standing on top of the highest peak,
Sometimes moving along the bottom of the deepest ocean.

Dōgen's Uji commentary on the poem begins by explaining that, "The 'time being' means time, just as it is, is being, and being is all time.", which shows the "unusual significance" he gives to the word uji "being-time.".

== Interpretations ==
Many authors have researched and discussed Dōgen's theories of temporality. In English, there are two books and numerous articles on uji (有時, "being-time; time-being; etc."). According to the traditional interpretation, uji "means time itself is being, and all being is time". Hee-Jin Kim analyzed Dōgen's conception of uji "existence/time" as the way of spiritual freedom, and found that his discourse can be better understood in terms of ascesis rather than vision of Buddha-nature; "vision is not discredited, but penetrated, empowered by ascesis".

Steven Heine's 1983 article on the hermeneutics of temporality in the Shōbōgenzō, that is, Dōgen critically reinterpreting and restating, "even at the risk of grammatical distortion," previous views of Buddha-nature in order to reflect the multidimensional unity of uji "being-time". For example, paraphrasing the venerated Nirvana Sutra, "If you wish to know the Buddha-nature's meaning, you should watch temporal conditions. If the time arrives, the Buddha-nature will manifest itself," Dōgen reinterprets the phrase "if the time arrives" (jisetsu nyakushi 時節若至) to mean "the time already arrived" (jisetsu kishi 時節既至) and comments, "There is no time right now that is not a time that has arrived,.. There is no Buddha-nature that is not Buddha-nature fully manifested right here-and-now.".

Heine's 1985 book contrasted the theories of time presented in Dōgen's 1231-1253 Shōbōgenzō and the German existentialist Martin Heidegger's 1927 classic Being and Time (Sein und Zeit). Despite the vast cultural and historical gaps between medieval Japan and modern Germany, there are philosophical parallels. The conventional conceptualization of time is removed from the genuine experience of what Heidegger calls ursprüngliche Zeit ("primordial time", that is, temporalizing temporality) and similar to what Dōgen calls uji no dōri (有時の道理, "truth of [being]-time").

Masao Abe's and Steven Heine's article analyzes the origins of Dōgen's interest in being-time when he was a young monk on Mount Hiei, the headquarters of the Tendai school of Buddhism. According to the 1753 Kenzeiki (建撕記) traditional biography of Dōgen, he became obsessed by doubts about the Tendai concepts of hongaku (本覚, "original awakening") that all human beings are enlightened by nature, and shikaku (始覺, "acquired awakening") that enlightenment can only be achieved through resolve and practice. "Both exoteric and esoteric Buddhism teach the original Dharma-nature and innate self-nature. If that were true, why have the Buddhas of past, present, and future awakened the resolve for and sought enlightenment through ascetic practices?". Dōgen's doubt eventually led him to travel to Song dynasty China to seek a resolution, which was dissolved through the enlightenment experience of shinjin-datsuraku (身心脱落, "casting off of body-mind") when he was a disciple of Rujing (1162-1228).

Joan Stambaugh, the philosopher and translator of Martin Heidegger's writings including Being and Time, wrote a book on Dōgen's understanding of temporality, Buddhist impermanence, and Buddha-nature. Rather than writing yet another comparative study, Stambaugh chose to produce a "dialogical" encounter between Eastern thinkers and Western philosophers, including Heraclitus, Boethius, Spinoza, Leibniz, Hegel, Schopenhauer, Kierkegaard, Nietzsche, and particularly Heidegger.

J. M. E. McTaggart's classic argument that time is unreal differentiated two basic aspects of temporality, the "A-series and B-series": the A-series orders all events as continual transformations in time's passage, things are said to exist in the "future", then become "present", and finally enter the "past"; while the B-Series orders time as a set of relative temporal relationships between "earlier than" and "later than". Dirck Vorenkamp demonstrated that Dōgen's writings contained elements of the "B-theory of time". The Shōbōgenzō describes time's passage without reference to a sentient subject, "You should learn that passage [kyōraku (経歴)] occurs without anything external. For example, spring's passage is necessarily that which passes through spring."

Trent Collier contrasts how Dōgen and Shinran (1173-1263), the founder of the Jōdo Shinshū sect of Pure Land Buddhism, diversely understood the role of time in Buddhist enlightenment. These two leaders in Kamakura Buddhism believed in two different forms of spiritual practice with disparate temporal concepts; Dōgen advocated zazen or shikantaza ("just sitting") meditation and Shinran emphasized the recitation of the nembutsu ("repeating the name of Amida") alone. Dōgen's notion of uji unified time and being, and consequently things in the world do not exist in time, but are time". According to the Uji fascicle, zazen falls outside the common understanding of time as past, present, and future. Dōgen declares that "When even just one person, at one time, sits in zazen, he becomes, imperceptively, one with each and all the myriad things, and permeates completely all time." Everything in reality is to be found in the absolute now of being-time. For Shinran, the central Pure Land awakening or experience is shinjin ("faith; piety; devotion"), the unfolding of Amida's wisdom-compassion in the believer. Shinran teaches that ichinen (一念, "one thought-moment") of shinjin is "time at its ultimate limit," and in the subjective experience of the practitioner, Amida's Primal Vow in the past and the Pure Land of the future are realized simultaneously. There are two ways of interpreting this "ultimate limit". In the first sense, it is the ultimate limit of samsaric existence, deluded and foolish existence stretched to its end; and in the second, "ultimate limit" refers to the absolute brevity of the one thought-moment, "the briefest instant of time, a moment so brief that it cannot be further divided".

Rein Raud wrote two articles concerning Dōgen's notion of uji, translated as "being-time". and "existential moment", respectively. Raud's first study compared uji with Nishida Kitarō's interpretation of basho (場所, "place, location") as "the locus of tension, where the contradictory self-identities are acted out and complementary opposites negate each other", and is thus "the 'place' where impermanence happens". Both these Japanese philosophers believed that in order to attain self-realization one must transcend the "ordinary" reality not by rising above it, and thereby separating oneself from it, but by "becoming" it, realizing oneself in it and the totality of the world, including "being-time". Raud's second study reinterprets Dōgen's concept of time as primarily referring to momentary rather than durational existence, and translates uji as "existential moment" in opposition to the usual understanding of time as measurable and divisible. According to Raud, this interpretation enables "more lucid readings" of many key passages in the Shōbōgenzō, such as translating the term kyōraku (経歴, "passage", etc.) as "shifting". In present day usage, this term is commonly read as Japanese keireki (経歴, "personal history; résumé; career") and Chinese jīnglì (經歷, "go through; undergo; experience").

Scholars have translated Dōgen's kyōraku as "continuity" (Masunaga), "flowing", "stepflow", "passing in a series of moments" (Nishijima and Cross), "passage", "totalistic passage or process" (Heine), and "seriatim passage". One translator says, "These attempts basically hit the mark, but fail to convey the freshness and originality of Dōgen's terminology, which is the verbal equivalent of him waving his arms wildly and screaming at the top of his lungs across the centuries to us: 'Look at my radical new idea about time!'". Compare these two renderings:

Being-time has the virtue of seriatim passage; it passes from today to tomorrow, passes from today to yesterday, passes from yesterday to today, passes from today to today, passes from tomorrow to tomorrow. This is because passing seriatim is a virtue of time. Past time and present time do not overlap one another, or pile up in a row.

The existential moment has the quality of shifting. It shifts from what we call "today" into "tomorrow," it shifts from "today" into "yesterday," and from "yesterday" into "today" in turn. It shifts from "today" into "today," it shifts from "tomorrow" into "tomorrow." This is because shifting is the quality of the momentary. The moments of the past and the present do not pile on each other nor do they line up side by side.

Dainin Katagiri says Dōgen's uji Being-time means the complete oneness of time and space, "dynamically functioning from moment to moment as illumination that is alive in the individual self". When time, being, self, and illumination come together and work dynamically in one's life, time and being are unified. Furthermore, self is time. The "self arrays itself and forms the entire universe." One should perceive each particular thing in the universe as a moment of time. Neither things nor moments hinder one another.

== See also ==
- Eternalism (philosophy of time)
- Philosophy of space and time
- Metaphysics of presence
