= Shin fukatoku =

13th Century Zen text

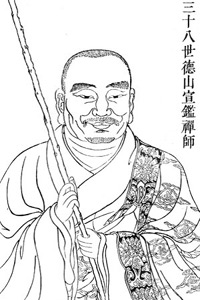
Portrait of Deshan Xuanjian, whose dialogue with an old woman is the subject of much of the essay

Shin fukatoku (Japanese: 心不可得), also known in English translation as The Mind Cannot Be Grasped, is a book of the Shōbōgenzō by the 13th century Sōtō Zen monk Eihei Dōgen. It was presented to his students in 1241 during the summer ango at his first monastery, Kōshōhōrin-ji, in Kyoto. The book appears eighth in the 75 fascicle version of the Shōbōgenzō, and it is ordered eighteenth in the later chronological 95 fascicle "Honzan edition". It was also included as the third book of the 28 fascicle "Eiheiji manuscript" Shōbōgenzō, and a variant of it was fourth in that version as well. The title is an excerpt from the line from the Diamond Sutra "Past mind cannot be grasped, present mind cannot be grasped, and future mind cannot be grasped". Gudō Nishijima, a modern Zen priest, contrasts the subject of this book with the line of René Descartes "I think, therefore I am", which suggests the intellect can grasp the mind. Nishijima states that Buddhism is instead only a "philosophy of the here and now" and that Dōgen is telling us the opposite of Descartes: the mind fundamentally lacks substance, cannot exist independently of the outside world, and therefore cannot be grasped. In order to illustrate this point, Dōgen examines a kōan story about Deshan Xuanjian, a Buddhist scholar of the Diamond Sutra, who attempts to purchase rice cakes from an old woman to "refresh his mind". The woman asks him what mind he intends to refresh if the mind cannot be grasped, leaving him speechless. Dōgen provides suggestions for how Deshan should have responded, and also for what the woman should have said after Deshan failed to say anything.
