= Sansui kyō =

Camilotezi

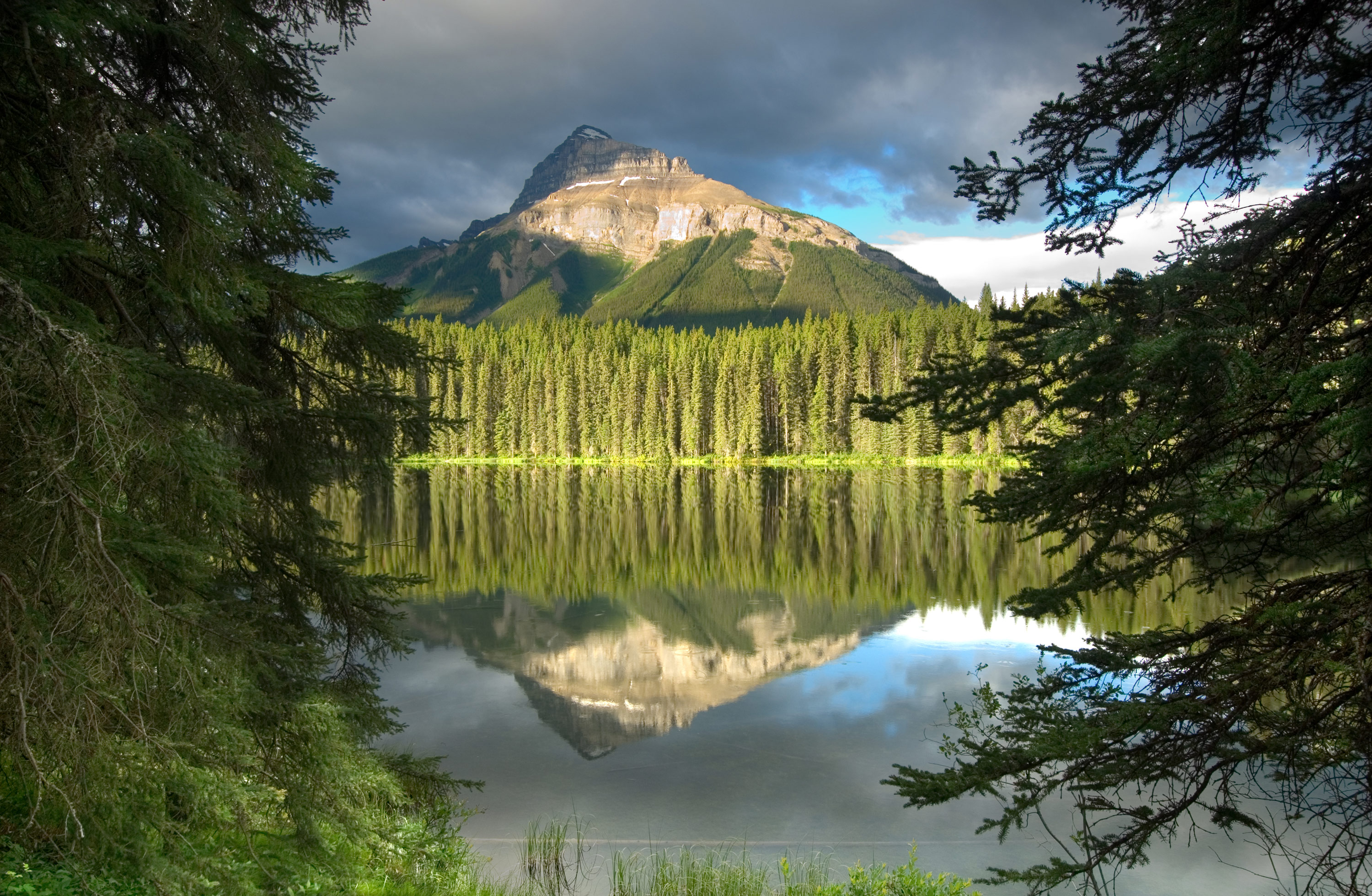
In this book, Dōgen equates mountains and waters with the Buddha's body and speech

Sansui kyō (Japanese: 山水經), rendered in English as Mountains and Waters Sutra, is a book of the Shōbōgenzō by the 13th century Sōtō Zen monk Eihei Dōgen. It is widely considered to be one of the most beautiful of all of the 95 books of the Shōbōgenzō according to Stanford University professor Carl Bielefeldt. The text was written in the fall of 1240 at Dōgen's monastery Kōshōhōrin-ji in Kyoto, and the manuscript from that time in Dōgen's own hand survives. This year saw a marked increase in the output of his essays for the Shōbōgenzō, including the closely related work Keisei sanshoku written a few months before and covering essentially the same theme, namely the mountains and rivers as equivalent to the body and speech of the Buddha. The book appears as the 29th in the 75 fascicle versions of the Shōbōgenzō, and it is ordered 14th in the later chronological 95 fascicle Honzan edition. It was also included as the 14th book of the 28 fascicle "Eiheiji manuscript" Shōbōgenzō. Gudō Nishijima, a modern Zen priest, sums up the essay as follows: "Buddhism is basically a religion of belief in the universe, and nature is the universe showing its real form. So to look at nature is to look at the Buddhist truth itself. For this reason, Master Dōgen believed that nature is just Buddhist sutras."
