= Fukan zazengi =

Essay describing the practice of zazen

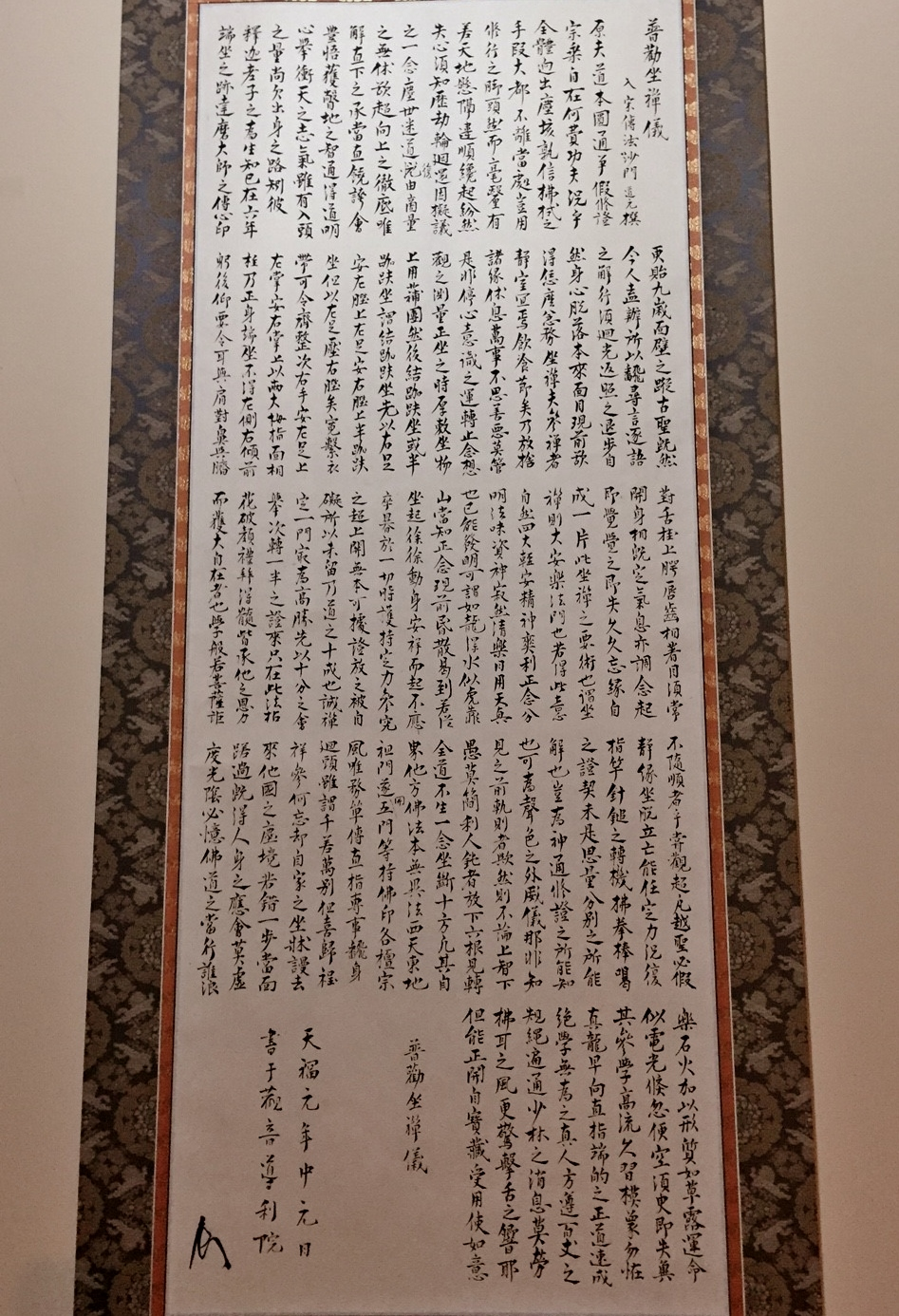
Reproduction of the Tenpuku version of Dogen's Fukanzazengi, originally produced in 1233

Fukan zazengi (Japanese: 普勸坐禪儀), also known by its English translation Universal Recommendation for Zazen, is an essay describing and promoting the practice of zazen written by the 13th century Japanese Zen monk Eihei Dōgen. The date of its composition is unclear, and the text evolved significantly over the author's lifetime. It is written in Classical Chinese rather than the Classical Japanese Dōgen used to compose his famous Shōbōgenzō.

It is traditionally thought to have been composed in 1227, shortly after Dōgen's return to Japan from his years of study in China. This is based on a statement to that effect in his essay Bendōwa from 1231. However, a manuscript of Fukan zazengi discovered in modern times that was produced by Dōgen's own hand ends with a Colophon (publishing) stating it was written in 1233. This version, known as the Tenpuku manuscript, also has a number of major differences from the more widely known version, the "vulgate version". The vulgate version, which is included in the Eihei Kōroku, likely has an even later date. Carl Bielefeldt, a scholar of Dōgen's work, believes it could not have been composed before 1242 based on similarities with the Shōbōgenzō book Zazen shin, which was composed in that year. There is also a Shōbōgenzō book entitled Zazen gi, composed sometime between 1243 and 1246, that appears to draw material from the vulgate Fukan zazengi and thus suggesting it would not have been written afterwards. Regardless of the exact date of its first composition, it is clear the material went through many rounds of editing over the author's lifetime.

Much of the section describing the actual practice of zazen is copied from the Zuochan yi, a meditation manual written by Changlu Zongze in the early 12th century.
