= Tenzo Kyōkun =

1237 Japanese essay on Soto Zen practice

Tenzo Kyōkun (典座教訓), usually rendered in English as Instructions for the Cook, is an important essay written by Dōgen, the founder of Zen Buddhism's Sōtō school in Japan.

== Title and content ==
While the title suggests the scope is limited to simple cooking instructions, Ekiho Miyazaki, an abbot of the Sōtō school's head temple Eihei-ji, summarizes the work's importance when he writes, "Instructions for the Cook are instructions for life". The work was written in 1237, ten years after Dōgen's return from his time in Song dynasty China. At this time he was practicing at the monastery he had founded four years earlier, Kōshōhōrin-ji. During this period he wrote several of his best known works such as Bendōwa, Fukan Zazengi, and Genjōkōan. However, the language and style in the Instructions are regarded as more concrete and straightforward than these other popular works. Instructions for the Cook is included as the first part of the Eihei Shingi, or Rules of Purity for Eihei-ji.

Renpō Niwa, a former abbot of Eihei-ji, divides the texts into five parts. The first part is the preface in which Dōgen emphasizes the importance of the work of the tenzo, or head cook. He asserts that the position is only suitable for experienced monks with a certain deep degree of understanding of zen practice. The next section describes the actual work the tenzo must carry out, as well as the attitude with which it should be undertaken. The third part includes instructions for serving, as well as an account of Dōgen's famous encounters with two monks serving as tenzo while he was visiting China. He acknowledges that these meetings had a deep and lasting impact on his understanding of Buddhism, and they thus ultimately helped shape Sōtō Zen in Japan. Next, Dōgen focuses on the need for the tenzo to act without any thought of discrimination or duality. In the last section, the discussion of the tenzo's attitude is concluded with a discussion of the Three Minds (Sanshin, 三心), a set of three ideals for Zen practice, namely magnanimous (or 'big') mind, nurturing mind, and joyful mind.

== Allusions to Kōan ==
Dōgen's essay makes numerous allusions to other works, especially kōans. One such reference is to a kōan attributed to Dongshan Shouchu that appears in both the Gateless Gate and the Blue Cliff Record. In it, Dongshan is asked, "What is Buddha"?, to which he replies, "Three pounds of hemp". Dōgen mentions the kōan in the opening of the essay while arguing how serious a position tenzo is, stating that Dongshan had this insight during his time serving as tenzo. While hemp may seem unrelated to the kitchen, the Zen scholars Shohaku Okumura and Taigen Dan Leighton suggest 'hemp' (麻) may be a mistranslation and that 'sesame' (胡麻) was intended, which makes more sense in the context of cooking. Dōgen mentions the kōan in order to suggest that the most simple activities, such as working with everyday ingredients, are no different from awakening when approached directly and with a clear mind.

Another kōan quoted in the work involves an encounter with the abbot Dongshan Liangjie and a tenzo at his monastery named Xuefeng Yicun. In the story, which is taken from the Zen en Shingi (Pure Standards of the Zen Garden, 禅苑清規), Xuefeng is cleaning rice when Dongshan asks, "Are you sifting the sand and removing the rice, or sifting the rice and removing the sand"? Xuefeng responds that both are removed at the same time. Dongshan then says, "What will the great assembly eat?" In response to this, Xuefeng overturns the bowl. Dongshan says, "In the future you will go and be scrutinized by someone else". The final line references the fact that Xuefeng ultimately studied under Touzi Datong, Dongshan, and Deshan Xuanjian before finally receiving dharma transmission. According to Kōryō Shinno in an essay on the kōans of Tenzo Kyōkun, Xuefeng gives his answer in order to express the nondualism of his activity. However, Dongshan follows up by reminding him that while his answer demonstrates a grasp on the absolute meaning of his activity, he is forgetting the utility value (i.e. feeding the other practitioners) and thus his apparently absolute understanding is in fact limited. Xuefeng does not grasp this and turns over the rice washing bowl in frustration.

== Translations ==
The short text that comprises the Instructions for the Cook has been translated into English and other languages, often as a part of the Eihei Shingi, or Rules of Purity for Eiheiji. These include

- Shohei, Ichimura (1993). Zen Master Dōgen's Monastic Regulations. North American Institute of Zen and Buddhist Studies. ISBN 978-0964378810.
- Leighton, Taigen Dan; Okumura, Shohaku (1995). Dōgen's Pure Standards for the Zen Community. State University of New York Press. ISBN 978-0791427101.
- Uchiyama, Kōshō; Wright (trans.), Thomas (1994). Refining Your Life: From the Zen Kitchen to Enlightenment. Weatherhill. ISBN 0-8348-0179-5.

== See also ==
- Shōbōgenzō
