= Maka hannya haramitsu =

Book

Maka hannya haramitsu (Japanese: 摩訶般若波羅蜜), the Japanese transliteration of Mahāprajñāpāramitā meaning The Perfection of Great Wisdom, is the second book of the Shōbōgenzō by the 13th century Sōtō Zen monk Eihei Dōgen. It is the second book in not only the original 60 and 75 fascicle versions of the text, but also the later 95 fascicle compilations. It was written in Kyoto in the summer of 1233, the first year that Dōgen began occupying the temple that what would soon become Kōshōhōrin-ji. As the title suggests, this chapter lays out Dōgen's interpretation of the Mahaprajñāpāramitāhṛdaya Sūtra, or Heart Sutra, so called because it is supposed to represent the heart of the 600 volumes of the Mahāprajñāpāramitā Sūtra. The Heart Sutra focuses on the Buddhist concept of prajñā, or wisdom, which indicates not conventional wisdom, but rather wisdom regarding the emptiness of all phenomena. As Dōgen argues in this chapter, prajñā is identical to the practice of zazen, not a way of thinking.

== Allusions to other works ==
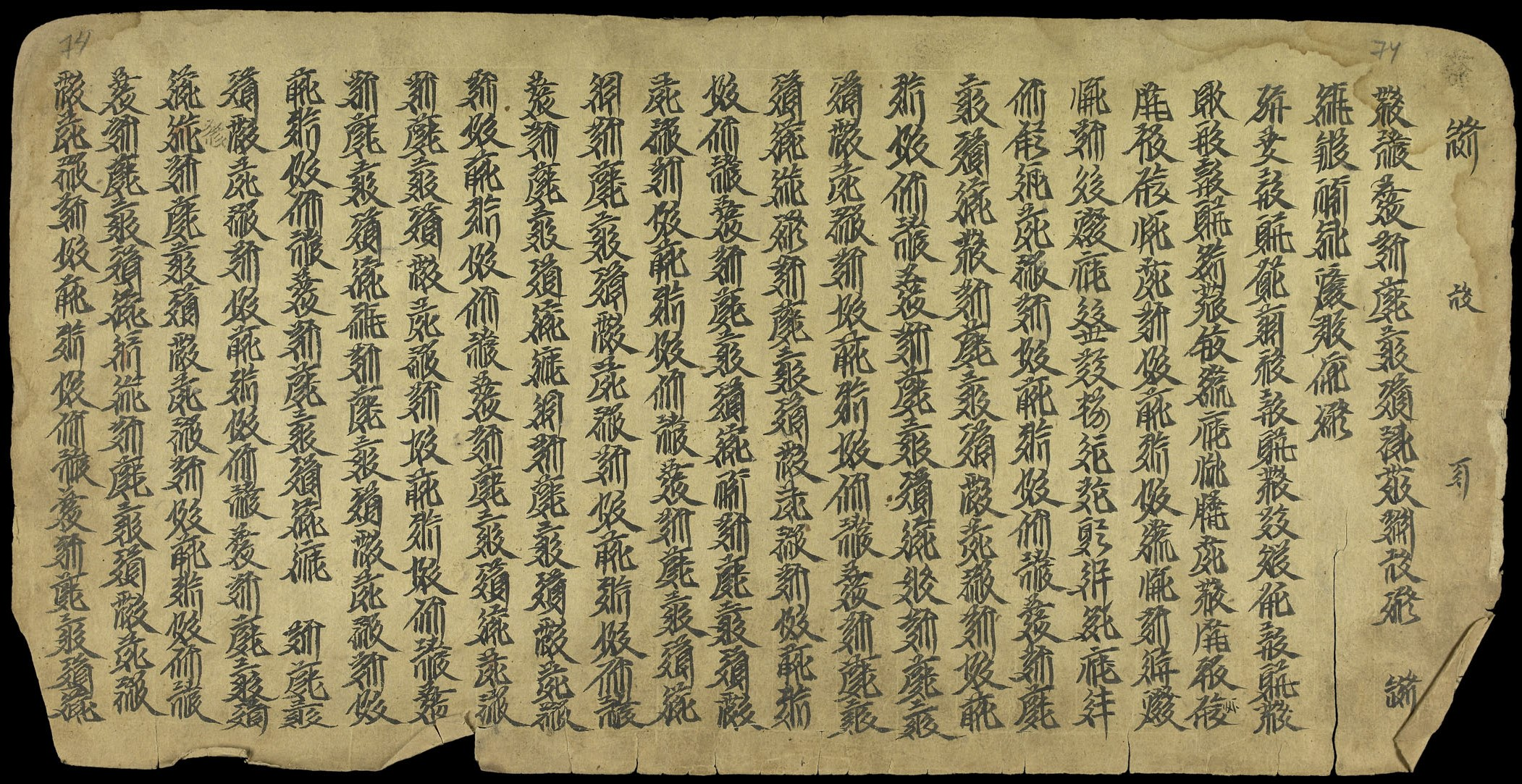
The Heart Sutra, seen here in a 12th-century manuscript, is the subject of Dōgen's essay and is heavily referenced

Although Dōgen's writing usually references other Buddhist works with heavy frequency, Maka hannya haramitsu only references the Heart Sutra, the Mahaprajnaparamita Sutra, and a poem about a wind bell by his teacher, Tiantong Rujing. The poem is from Record of the Words of Master Rujing and is as follows:

The whole body is like a mouth hanging in empty space.
Not questioning the winds from east, west, south, or north,
Equally all of them, speaking of prajñā:
Ding-dong-a-ling ding-dong.

According to Shohaku Okumura, the wind bell or hanging mouth represents ourselves while the winds represent all of the different circumstances that can face us. Regardless of what comes our way, we need not discriminate. When we view the world without discrimination, we express prajñā and see the reality of life. The last line is an onomatopoeia for the sound the bell makes, representing the expression of prajñā, wisdom of reality itself, as well as the interdependence of all things.

== Translations ==
- "Great Transcendent Wisdom", Shobogenzo: Zen Essays By Dogen, translated by Cleary, Thomas, Honolulu, HI: University of Hawaii Press, 1986, ISBN 0-8248-1014-7
- Shobogenzo: The Eye and Treasury of the True Law, translated by Nishiyama, Kōsen; Stevens, John, Tokyo, Japan: Nakayama Shobo, 1975, ISBN 0-87040-363-X
- "Mahāprajñāpāramitā", Master Dogen's Shōbōgenzō, translated by Nishijima, Gudo; Cross, Chodo, Dogen Sangha, 1994, ISBN 1-4196-3820-3
- "On the Great Wisdom That Is Beyond Discriminatory Thought", Shobogenzo, or The Treasure House of the Eye of the True Teachings, translated by Nearman, Hubert, Shasta Abbey Press, 1996, ISBN 0-930066-17-0
- "Manifestation of Great Prajna", Treasury of the True Dharma Eye: Zen Master Dogen's Shōbōgenzō, translated by Tanahashi, Kazuaki; Brown, Edward, Shambhala Publications, 2011, ISBN 978-1590304747
- "Practicing Deepest Wisdom", Deepest Practice, Deepest Wisdom: Three Fascicles from Shobogenzo with Commentary, translated by Okumura, Shōhaku, Somerville, MA: Wisdom Publications, 2018, ISBN 978-1614293026
