= Sokushin zebutsu =

1239 book on Zen written by Dōgen

Sokushin zebutsu (Japanese: 即心是佛), rendered in English as Mind is Itself Buddha, is a book of the Shōbōgenzō by the 13th century Sōtō Zen monk Eihei Dōgen. It was written in the spring of 1239 at Dōgen's monastery Kōshōhōrin-ji in Kyoto. The book appears as the fifth book in both the 75 and 60 fascicle versions of the Shōbōgenzō, and it is ordered sixth in the later chronological 95 fascicle Honzan editions. The title Sokushin zebutsu is an utterance attributed to the 8th century Song Dynasty Zen monk Mazu Daoyi in a well known kōan that appears most notably as Case 30 in The Gateless Barrier, although Dōgen would have known it from the earlier Transmission of the Lamp. In addition to this book of the Shōbōgenzō, Dōgen also discusses the phrase Sokushin zebutsu in several of his formal Dharma Hall Discourses, namely numbers 8, 75, 319, and 370, all of which are recorded in the Eihei Kōroku.

Dōgen's book Sokushin zebutsu lays out his understanding of this phrase, rendered in English as mind is itself Buddha. He quickly notes that he views as incorrect the interpretation that the "ordinary thoughts and awareness of sentient beings" are already Buddha. He states that instead, "Sokushin zebutsu is buddhas of aspiration, practice, awakening, and nirvana. Those who have not actualized aspiration, practice, awakening, and nirvana are not sokushin zebutsu.” While aspiration, practice, awakening, and nirvana are a version of the four stages of enlightenment and are normally thought of a series of steps one must go through to achieve a final goal, Dōgen writes in the Shōbōgenzō book Gyōji, "Where aspiration is present, there is already practice. Practice is itself awakening. This practice-awakening is nirvana. Thus “aspiration, practice, awakening, and nirvana” are not sequential stages. All are one." Thus, for Dōgen, sokushin zebutsu is identical to practice, or zazen. Further, at the conclusion of the essay, Dōgen writes, “The buddhas spoken of here are none other than Shakayamuni Buddha. Shakyamuni Buddha is sokushin zebutsu. When all buddhas in the past, present, and future are buddhas, they unfailingly become Shakyamuni Buddha". Dōgen thus equates mind, Buddhas, Shakyamuni Buddha, Bodhicitta, practice or zazen, awakening, and enlightenment, offering a characteristic teaching in nondualism.
