= Keisei sanshoku (Shōbōgenzō) =

Keisei sanshoku (Japanese: 谿声山色), rendered in English as The Sounds of Valley Streams, the Forms of Mountains, is the 25th book of the Shōbōgenzō by the 13th century Sōtō Zen monk Eihei Dōgen. It was written in the spring of 1240 at Dōgen's monastery Kōshōhōrin-ji in Kyoto. The book appears in both the 75 and 60 fascicle versions of the Shōbōgenzō, and it is ordered ninth in the later chronological 95 fascicle editions. The name keisei sanshoku is a quotation from the Song dynasty Chinese poet Su Shi, wherein he experiences the sound of the valley stream as the preaching of the dharma and the mountain as the body of the Buddha. Dogen also discusses this verse of Su Shi in the later Shōbōgenzō books of Sansui Kyō and Mujō Seppō. About halfway through the essay, Dōgen switches from focusing on the title theme to a discussion of Buddhist ethics before ultimately concluding that one must practice ethical behavior in order to see the dharma in the natural world as Su Shi does.

== Title ==
The name keisei sanshoku is a paraphrase from the Song dynasty Chinese poet Su Shi, wherein he experiences the sound of the valley stream as the preaching of the dharma and the mountain as the body of the Buddha. The poem of Su Shi's being referenced is as follows:

The voices of the river valley are the [Buddha's] wide and long tongue,
The form of the mountains is nothing other than his pure body.
Through the night, eighty-four thousand verses.
On another day, how can I tell them to others?

Although the title consists of only four Chinese characters (谿声山色), they have been translated into English in many different ways. While the third character (山) is always unambiguously translated as "mountain", the other three have more diverse interpretations. The second character (声) indicates either "sound" or "voice, while the final character can mean "form" or "color". The many English translations of the title are listed below:

Author(s)	Title Translation	Publication year
Carl Bielefeldt	Sound of the Stream, Form of the Mountain	2013
Gudō Wafu Nishijima and Chodō Cross	The Voices of the River Valley and the Form of the Mountains	1994
Kosen Nishiyama and John Stevens	The Sounds of Valley Streams, the Forms of Mountains	1975
Yuho Yokoi	Sound of a Rill and the Figure of a Mountain	1986
Thomas Cleary	Sounds of the Valley Streams, Colors of the Mountains	1992
Hubert Nearman	The Rippling of a Valley Stream, The Contour of a Mountain	2007
Kazuaki Tanahashi	Valley Sounds, Mountain Colors	2010

Regardless of the particular translation, the title is ultimately metonymy for the natural world as a whole. As Gudō Nishijima explains:

In Buddhism, this world is the truth itself, so nature is a face of the truth. Nature is the material side of the real world, so it is always speaking the truth, and manifesting the law of the universe every day. This is why it has been said since ancient times that sounds of rivers are the preaching of Gautama Buddha and forms of mountains are the body of Gautama Buddha. In this chapter, Master Dōgen preached to us the meaning of nature in Buddhism".
