= Ikka myōju =

Ikka myōju (Japanese: 一顆明珠), known in English as One Bright Jewel or One Bright Pearl, is a book of the Shōbōgenzō by the 13th century Sōtō Zen monk Eihei Dōgen. It was written in the summer of 1238 at Dōgen's monastery Kōshōhōrin-ji in Kyoto. The essay marked the beginning of a period of high output of Shōbōgenzō books that lasted until 1246. The book appears as the seventh book in both the 75 and 60 fascicle versions of the Shōbōgenzō, and it is ordered fourth in the later chronological 95 fascicle Honzan editions. The essay is an extended commentary on the famous saying of the Tang dynasty monk Xuansha Shibei that "the ten-direction world is one bright jewel", which in turn references the Mani Jewel metaphors of earlier Buddhist scriptures. Dōgen also discusses the "one bright jewel" and related concepts from the Shōbōgenzō essay in two of his formal Dharma Hall Discourses, namely numbers 107 and 445, as well as his Kōan commentaries 23 and 41, all of which are recorded in the Eihei Kōroku.

== The Mani Jewel ==
The title of the essay is often translated into English as One Bright Pearl instead of One Bright Jewel. Shohaku Okumura, a modern Zen priest and Dōgen scholar, points out that while the character in question (珠) can be used to refer to a pearl, gem, or any kind of jewel, the text clearly uses the term in reference to the "Mani Jewel" (摩尼珠), a mythical transparent object mentioned in a wide variety of Buddhist texts. Because pearls are not transparent, and because the transparency is essential for the meaning of the essay, "pearl" is therefore incongruous with the context of the writing. Okumura further argues that a knowledge of the Mani Jewel as it appears in prior texts is essential for understanding the meaning of Dōgen's essay.

=== Early References to the Mani Jewel ===
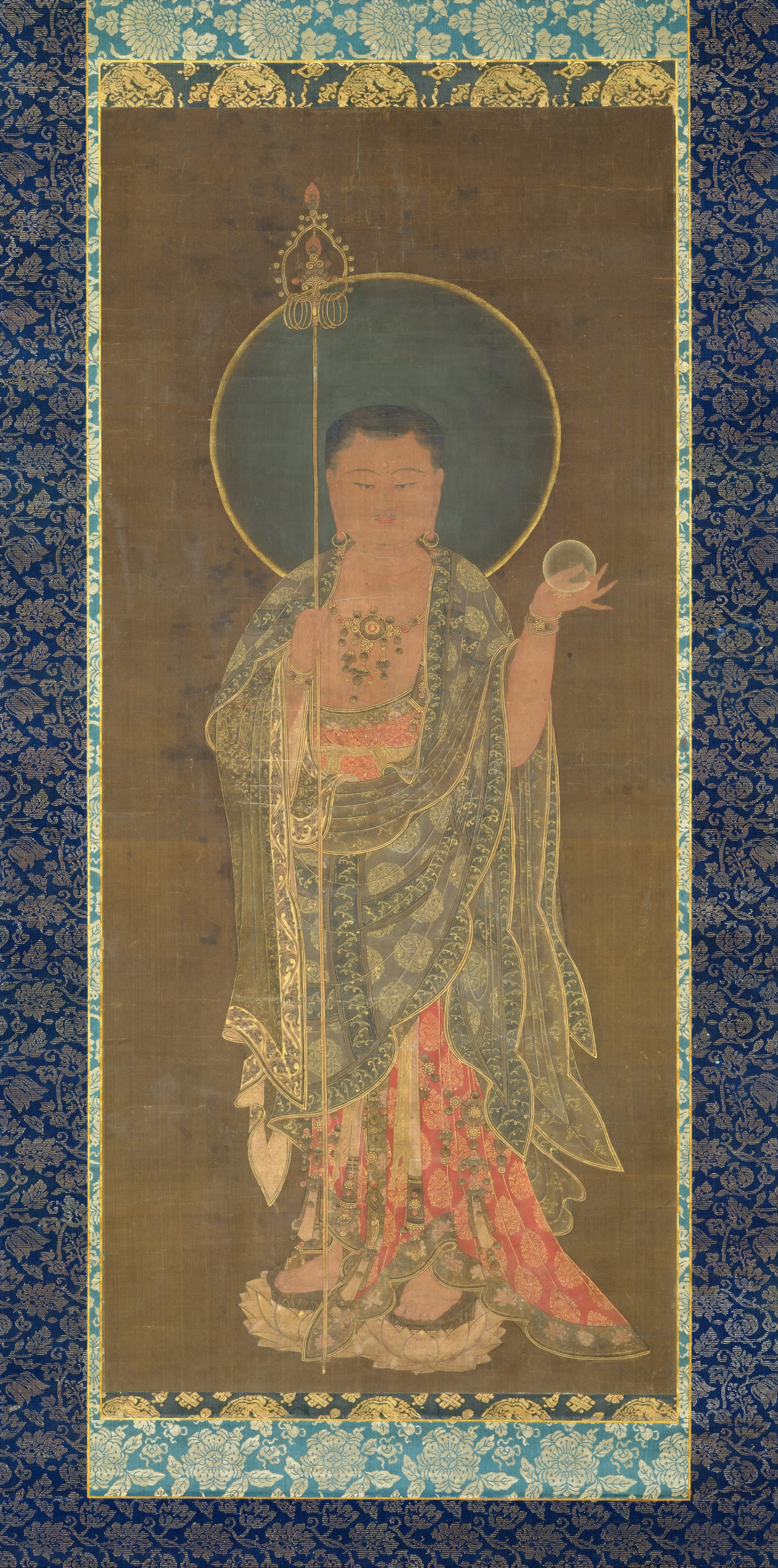
Ksitigarbha holding the Cintamani, or wish-fulfilling Jewel

The Mani Jewel makes its first appearance in the Pali Nikāyas where it is mentioned as one of the seven treasures owned by a "wheel-turning king". The Mahasudhassana Sutta in the Digha Nikaya describes the Mani Jewel as follows:

“It was a beryl, pure, excellent, well-cut into eight facets, clear, bright, unflawed, perfect in every respect. The luster of this Jewel-Treasure radiated for an entire yojana round about.

The Mani Jewel in this text serves as the source of virtue and good governance for the king. Without it he would lose his throne.

Later texts describe the Mani Jewel differently. One version is the Cintamani or wish-fulfilling jewel. It was said to be originally owned by the God Indra, but it fell to the earth during a war with the Asuras, allowing whoever possess it to have their wishes granted. Depictions of the Bodhisattvas Ksitigarbha and Avalokiteshvara sometimes show them holding this Cintamani, indicating their ability to fulfill the wishes of sentient beings.

The Mani Jewel also appears as a water purifying jewel (清水摩尼) where it could be placed in muddy water by traveling monks, causing any cloudiness to settle out leaving the water clear and pure. This version of the jewel is mentioned in the Abhidharma-kosa where it is used as a metaphor for faith as an agent capable of dispelling uncertainty.

Yet another depiction of the jewel is in the metaphor of Indra's net which appears in the Avatamsaka Sutra. It describes a net of infinite size with infinite knots, with each knot containing a Mani Jewel with infinite facets. Each individual Mani Jewel reflects every other Mani Jewel in the same way that any individual being or phenomenon is indistinguishable from the whole or noumenon due to their fundamental interconnectedness.

=== The Mani Jewel in Buddha Nature Sutras ===
The Lankavatara Sutra, the Sutra of Perfect Enlightenment, and the Surangama Sutra all used the Mani Jewel as metaphors for Buddha-nature. It was this metaphor in particular that Xuansha Shibei had in mind for his expression "the ten-direction world is one bright jewel", and is thus the primary focus of Dōgen's essay. In these sutras, a transparent Mani Jewel within us changes colors depending on the conditions around us, representing the five skandhas. The Mani Jewel itself represents each being's Buddha-nature, but because of the three poisons of ignorance, attachment, and aversion, a being sees only the various colors emitted by the jewel. These are mistakenly perceived as the defilements rather than the purity of the jewel itself, which is merely reflecting conditions around it. Thus Buddha-nature is not perceived and only the five skandhas are seen, which are then conflated with a sense of self in opposition to the Buddhist idea of anātman or no-self.

=== The Mani Jewel in Zen ===
Later, the Mani Jewel began to appear in texts produced by Zen Buddhists. An early example is found in Guifeng Zongmi's work Chart of the Master-Disciple Succession of the Chan Gate That Transmits the Mind Ground in China in which he compares the four contemporary Zen schools: the Northern School, the Ox Head School, the Hongzhou school and the Heze school. He accomplishes this by comparing how each school would interpret the Mani Jewel metaphor used in the Sutra of Perfect Enlightenment discussed above. The text also contains the first use of the specific phrase, "one bright jewel" (一顆明珠). According to Guifeng, the Northern School would believe in a fundamentally pure Mani Jewel that must be cleaned to reveal its purity; the Ox Head school would perceive both the color reflections and the Mani Jewel itself as empty; the Hongzhou school would say that the blackness covering the Mani Jewel is the Jewel itself, and that its purity can never be seen; the Heze School (to which Guifeng belonged) would interpret the black color covering the jewel as an illusion that is in fact just a manifestation of its brightness such that the surface defilements and the purity of the Jewel interpenetrate one another.
