= Yōkō Senne =

Yōkō Senne 永興詮慧
- Title: Zen Master

Personal life
- Born: late 12th or early 13th century
- Died: late 13th or early 14th century

Religious life
- Religion: Buddhism
- School: Sōtō

Senior posting
- Teacher: Dōgen
- Predecessor: Dōgen
- Successor: Kyōgō
- Students: Kyōgō

Yōkō Senne (永興詮慧) (fl. 13th century), more often known simply as Senne (詮慧), was a Japanese Sōtō Zen monk who lived during the Kamakura period and was an important disciple of his sect's founder, Eihei Dōgen. Initially a monk in the Tendai school, he later joined Dōgen at his first monastery, Kōshōhōrin-ji. He would go on to become Dōgen's attendant (jisha) there, and he later compiled the first and ninth volumes of Dōgen's collected works known as Eihei Kōroku. He is one of a small number of students believed to have received dharma transmission from Dōgen, along with Koun Ejō and Sōkai. According to legend, Dōgen even gave Senne the kāṣāya, or dharma robe, of Furong Daokai, a famous 11th century Chinese Zen master, which had in turn been allegedly given to Dōgen by his teacher Tiantong Rujing.

After Dōgen's death, Senne returned to Kyoto and founded his own temple called Yōkōji (永興寺; not to be confused with the Yōkōji founded by Keizan on the Noto Peninsula, which uses the characters 永光寺). It was located near Kennin-ji, the temple where Dōgen first practiced Zen and was later cremated, but Yōkōji no longer exists and its precise location is unknown. A poem by the Sōtō monk Daichi Sokei, who visited the temple sometime before 1340, suggests the temple was already in decline by that time. Senne's student Kyōgō (経豪), who had also studied under Dōgen, became the second abbot of Yōkō-ji. Kyōgō compiled two commentaries on the 75-fascicle version of Dōgen's Shōbōgenzō, the first of which is called Shōbōgenzō shō (正法眼蔵抄) and the second Shōbōgenzō gokikigaki (正法眼蔵御聴書). Collectively, they are called Gokikikgakishō (御聴書抄), which is usually abbreviated as Goshō (御抄). Senne is believed to be the author of the Shōbōgenzō gokikigaki due to the use of the honorific modifier go (御), which would not normally be used to refer to one's own writing. The Gokikigaki contains a date of 1263, suggesting Senne may have completed it around that time. Kyōgō began his Shōbōgenzō shō in 1303 and completed it in 1308, likely suggesting that Senne had already died by this time. The oldest manuscript of the Goshō also contains a commentary on the Brahma Net Sutra dated 1309 but the explanations are attributed to Kyōgō's "former teacher," which could refer to Senne, but likely refers to Dōgen due to extensive quotation of him in the commentary.

Although Senne and Kyōgō's commentaries were not widely read during their lifetimes, they played a decisive role in defining the modern orthodoxy of modern Sōtō Zen doctrine. Starting in the Tokugawa era in Japan, resurgent interest in the Shōbōgenzō and Dōgen's thought led scholars to Senne and Kyōgō's Goshō in order to make sense of Dōgen's difficult writing. The reliance of Tokugawa scholars on the Goshō for understanding Dōgen has meant that current understandings of the Shōbōgenzō and other aspects of Dōgen's approach to Zen have been heavily mediated through the writing of Senne and Kyōgō.
