= Zazen gi =

Book of Sōtō Zen Buddhism

Zazen gi (Japanese: 坐禪儀), also known in various English translations such as The Standard Method of Zazen or Principles of Zazen, is a book of the Shōbōgenzō by the 13th century Sōtō Zen monk Eihei Dōgen. The book appears tenth in the 75 fascicle version of the Shōbōgenzō, and it is ordered 58th in the later chronological 95 fascicle "Honzan edition". It was presented to his students in the eleventh month of 1243 at Yoshimine shōja (吉峰精舍), a small temple where Dōgen and his sangha practiced briefly following their sudden move to Echizen Province from their previous temple Kōshōhōrin-ji earlier in the same year and before the establishment of Eihei-ji. Unlike other books of the Shōbōgenzō, it is not as much a commentary on classical Chinese Chan literature as it is a guide for the practice of zazen. The title comes from earlier Chinese texts of the same name and purpose, with a well known example found in the Chanyuan qinggui, from which Dōgen quotes extensively. His more famous Fukan zazengi, as well as Eihei shingi's Bendoho, also owe much to this Chinese text and are thus closely related to the Shōbōgenzō's Zazen gi.
