= Mani Jewel =

Gemstone in Buddhist literature

A Mani Jewel (Chinese: 摩尼珠; pinyin: móní zhū; Japanese pronunciation: mani ju) or "maṇi-ratna" refers to any of various jewels or crystal mentioned in Buddhist literature as either metaphors for several concepts in Buddhist philosophy or as mythical relics. The word mani is simply Tamil, Sanskrit and Pali for "jewel", so the phrase "Mani Jewel" is in one sense redundant. However, the Mani Jewel metaphors were significantly expanded in Chinese language texts in which it was also called by essentially the same redundant name móní zhū, where the first two characters (摩尼; móní) are the transcription of mani and the third character (珠) is its Chinese translation, "jewel". The English phrase "Mani Jewel" is thus in essence a translation of the Chinese term. The use of the Mani Jewel in Buddhist literature includes various magical relics such as the wish-fulfilling cintamani as well as metaphorical devices to illustrate several ideas such as Buddha-nature (Om mani padme hum) and Śūnyatā.

== Early literary references ==
The Mani Jewel makes its first appearance in the Pali Nikāyas where it is mentioned as one of the seven treasures owned by a "wheel-turning king". The Mahasudhassana Sutta in the Digha Nikaya describes the Mani Jewel (maṇi-ratna) as follows:

"It was a beryl, pure, excellent, well-cut into eight facets, clear, bright, unflawed, perfect in every respect. The luster of this Jewel-Treasure radiated for an entire yojana round about."

The Mani Jewel in this text serves as the source of virtue and good governance for the king. Without it he would lose his throne.

Later texts describe the Mani Jewel differently. One version is the Cintamani or wish-fulfilling jewel. It was said to be originally owned by the God Indra, but it fell to the earth during a war with the Asuras, allowing whoever possess it to have their wishes granted. Depictions of the Bodhisattvas Ksitigarbha and Avalokiteshvara sometimes show them holding this Cintamani, indicating their ability to fulfill the wishes of sentient beings.

The Mani Jewel also appears as a water purifying jewel (清水摩尼) where it could be placed in muddy water by traveling monks, causing any cloudiness to settle out leaving the water clear and pure. This version of the jewel is mentioned in the Abhidharma-kosa where it is used as a metaphor for faith as an agent capable of dispelling uncertainty.

Yet another depiction of the jewel is in the metaphor of Indra's net which appears in the Avatamsaka Sutra. It describes a net of infinite size with infinite knots, with each knot containing a Mani Jewel with infinite facets. Each individual Mani Jewel reflects every other Mani Jewel in the same way that any individual being or phenomenon is indistinguishable from the whole or noumenon due to their fundamental interconnectedness.

== In Buddha Nature Sutras ==
The Lankavatara Sutra, the Sutra of Perfect Enlightenment, and the Surangama Sutra all used the Mani Jewel as metaphors for Buddha-nature. In these sutras, a transparent Mani Jewel within us changes colors depending on the conditions around us, representing the five skandhas. The Mani Jewel itself represents each being's Buddha-nature, but because of the three poisons of ignorance, attachment, and aversion, a being sees only the various colors emitted by the jewel. These are mistakenly perceived as the defilements rather than the purity of the jewel itself, which is merely reflecting conditions around it. Thus Buddha-nature is not perceived and only the five skandhas are seen, which are then conflated with a sense of self in opposition to the Buddhist idea of anātman or no-self.

== In Zen ==
Later, the Mani Jewel began to appear in texts produced by Zen Buddhists. An early example is found in Guifeng Zongmi's work Chart of the Master-Disciple Succession of the Chan Gate That Transmits the Mind Ground in China in which he compares the four contemporary Zen schools: the Northern School, the Ox Head School, the Hongzhou school and the Heze school. He accomplishes this by comparing how each school would interpret the Mani Jewel metaphor used in the Sutra of Perfect Enlightenment discussed above. According to Guifeng, the Northern School would believe in a fundamentally pure Mani Jewel that must be cleaned to reveal its purity; the Ox Head school would perceive both the color reflections and the Mani Jewel itself as empty; the Hongzhou school would say that the blackness covering the Mani Jewel is the Jewel itself, and that its purity can never be seen; the Heze School (to which Guifeng belonged) would interpret the black color covering the jewel as an illusion that is in fact just a manifestation of its brightness such that the surface defilements and the purity of the Jewel interpenetrate one another.

Eihei Dōgen, a 13th-century Zen monk and founder of the Sōtō school of Zen Buddhism in Japan, wrote extensively on the Mani Jewel in an essay of his large work the Shōbōgenzō entitled Ikka myōju, or One Bright Jewel. The essay primarily comments on the phrase of the Tang dynasty Chinese monk Xuansha Shibei, who wrote that "the ten-direction world is one bright jewel". His phrase is in turn an adaptation of the earlier writings of Guifeng Zongmi mentioned above.

== See also ==
- Luminous gemstones
