= Menzan Zuihō =

Menzan Zuihō 面山瑞方
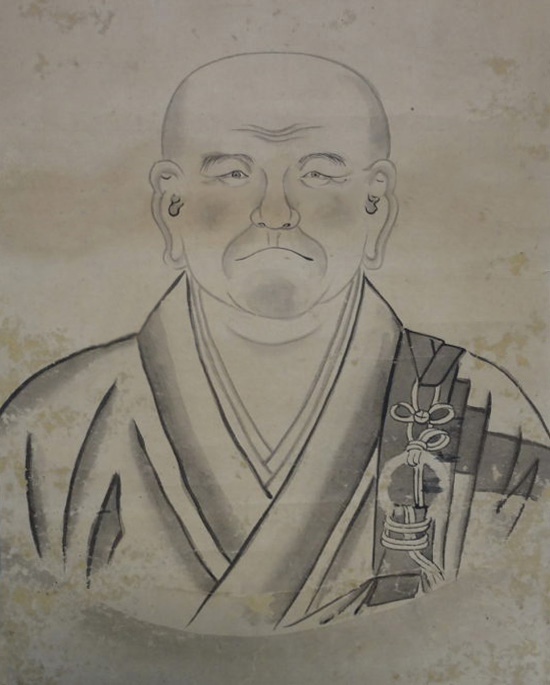
- Title: Zen Master

Personal life
- Born: 1683 Ueki, Kyushu, Japan
- Died: 1769 (aged 85–86)

Religious life
- Religion: Buddhism
- School: Sōtō

Senior posting
- Teacher: Dōgen
- Predecessor: Dōgen
- Successor: Kōda Soryō (衡田祖量)
- Students: Kōda Soryō (衡田祖量), Fuzan Gentotsu (斧山玄鈯)

Menzan Zuihō (面山瑞方, 1683–1769) was a Japanese Sōtō Zen scholar and abbot of the Zenjo-ji and Kuin-ji temples active during the Tokugawa period.

Born in Ueki, Kyushu, Menzan was the most influential Sōtō Zen writer of his time and his work continue to influence Sōtō Zen scholarship and practice today. Menzan's scholarship was part of the Tokugawa movement of returning to original historical sources to revitalize Zen (復古 fukko, "return to the old"), especially the works of Dōgen Zenji. Before Menzan the works of Dōgen were not widely studied or put into practice, he helped revitalize the Sōtō school by analyzing and building on Dogen's writings. Menzan used Dōgen to promote a reform of the Sōtō sect, which included reforming the monastic code and meditation practice. Due to Menzan's efforts, Dōgen studies now occupies a central position in Sōtō Zen thought. Menzan wrote to advocate the use of the old Song dynasty monk's hall system, in which monks ate, slept, and meditated in one large monk's hall, rather than in separate rooms as was commonly practiced in Japan at the time.

Menzan was the most prolific Sōtō zen scholar, having written over a hundred titles of detailed scholarship on monastic regulations, precepts, ordination, dharma transmission and philology. Menzan was also involved in lecturing to the public and teaching laymen and laywomen meditation practice. One of his most famous works, the Buddha Samadhi (Jijuyu Zanmai) is addressed to laypeople and focuses on the teachings of Dōgen.

== Partial list of works ==
- Record of the Activities of the Founder of Eihei
- Buddha Samadhi
- Standards for Walking Meditation
- Selections for Ceremonial Procedures from the Pure Rules for the Monks Hall of Soto
- Additional Record of Historical Research Concerning the Pure Rules for the Monks Hall of Soto
- Record of the Teachings of the Hoei Era
- Fireside Chat on a Snowy Eve
- Personal Record of the Rejection of the Kirikami of the Soto Abbot's Room
- Revised and Expanded Record of Kenzei
- Record of the Activities of Zen Teacher T'ien-t'ung Ju-ching
- Fukanzazengi monge (commentary on Dogen's Universally recommended instructions for Zazen)
- Zazenshin monge (commentary on Dogen's Lancet of Zazen)
- Gakudo yojin-shu monge (commentary on Dogen's Things to look out for in your Buddhist training)
- Tenzo kyokun monge (commentary on Dogen's Instructions to the cook)
- The Teaching of the Correctly Transmitted Great Precepts of the Buddhas and Ancestors
- Verses for the Chapters of the Mahaprajnaparamita Sutra
- Source Texts Cited in the Shōbōgenzō
- Explanations of the Old Cases Presented by the Old Buddha of Hsi Province
- Explanations of the One Hundred Old Cases of Zen Teacher Hsüeh-tou Hsien
- On the Donations of the Faithful
