= Daigo (Zen) =

Daigo-tettei (大悟徹底, daigo-tettei) is a Japanese term used within Zen Buddhism, which usually denotes a "great realization or enlightenment." Moreover, "traditionally, daigo is final, absolute enlightenment, contrasted to experiences of glimpsing enlightenment, shōgo" or kenshō. According to Dōgen in a fascicle of the Shōbōgenzō titled Daigo, the master Dōgen writes that when practitioners of Zen attain daigo they have risen above the discrimination between delusion and enlightenment. Author J.P. Williams writes, "In contrast, in SG Daigo, the apparently positive 'great enlightenment' is more clearly an extension of the meaning of fugo, no-enlightenment, than 'enlightenment.'

== See also ==
- Kenshō
- Mushi-dokugo
- Satori
