= Shinjin gakudō =

Shinjin gakudō (Japanese: 身心學道), translated into English as Learning the Truth with Body and Mind, is a book of the Shōbōgenzō by the 13th century Sōtō Zen monk Eihei Dōgen. It was written in the fall of 1242 at Dōgen's first monastery Kōshōhōrin-ji in Kyoto. Shinjin gakudō appears in both the 75 and 60 fascicle versions of the Shōbōgenzō as the fourth book, and it is ordered 37th in the later chronological 95 fascicle Honzan editions. The book explains how truth can be obtained not with the mind alone, but rather with the body and mind together working through action. He further explains that action necessarily requires both the body and mind and that there is thus a oneness in action.
