= Daigo (Shōbōgenzō) =

Daigo (Japanese: 大悟), also known in English translation as Great Realization, is a book of the Shōbōgenzō by the 13th century Sōtō Zen monk Eihei Dōgen. The book appears tenth in the 75 fascicle version of the Shōbōgenzō, and it is ordered 26th in the later chronological 95 fascicle "Honzan edition". It was presented to his students in the first month of 1242 at Kōshōhōrin-ji, the first monastery established by Dōgen, located in Kyoto. According to Gudō Nishijima, a modern Zen priest, the "great realization" to which Dōgen refers is not an intellectual idea, but rather a "concrete realization of facts in reality" or "realization in real life". Shōhaku Okumura, another modern-day Zen teacher, writes that Dōgen equates the term daigo with the network of interdependence in which all beings in the universe exist rather than something that we lack and need to obtain. Given this, Okumura writes that Dōgen is encouraging us to, "to realize great realization within this great realization, moment by moment; or perhaps it is better to say that great realization realizes great realization through our practice."
