= Kobutsushin =

Book by Eihei Dōgen

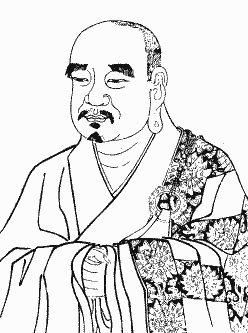
The "National Teacher", Nanyang Huizhong, whose saying provides much of the inspiration for Dōgen's Kobutsushin

Kobutsushin or Kobusshin (Japanese: 古佛心), also known in various English translations such as The Mind of Eternal Buddhas or Old Buddha Mind, is a book of the Shōbōgenzō by the 13th century Sōtō Zen monk Eihei Dōgen. The book appears ninth in the 75 fascicle version of the Shōbōgenzō, and it is ordered 44th in the later chronological 95 fascicle "Honzan edition". It was presented to his students in the fourth month of 1243 at Rokuharamitsu-ji, a temple in a neighborhood of eastern Kyoto populated primarily by military officials of the new Kamakura shogunate. This was the same location where he presented another book of the same collection called Zenki. Both were short works compared to others in the collection, and in both cases he was likely invited to present them at the behest of his main patron, Hatano Yoshishige, who lived nearby. Later in the same year, Dōgen suddenly abandoned his temple Kōshōhōrin-ji in Kyoto and began to establish Eihei-ji.

The first half of the text stakes out a novel interpretation of the meaning of the term Kobutsu (古佛), literally meaning "Old Buddha". While typically the term had been used to refer to the Seven Buddhas of Antiquity, Dōgen uses it to refer to all of those before him who have passed on the Zen tradition. More specifically, Dōgen denies the duality of the buddhas of the ancient past and the practitioners of the more recent past and present. He then supports this usage by citing examples from Zen records of the past teachers Tiantong Rujing, Yuanwu Keqin, Sushan Guangren, and Xuefeng Yicun.

The second half of the text focuses on the full term used as the title of the book, Kobutushin (古佛心), literally "Old Buddha Mind". He does so through the presentation of a famous saying from Nanyang Huizhong, the so-called "National Teacher", who said the old buddha mind is nothing other than "fences, walls, tiles, and pebbles", which is to say everyday reality and the phenomena that comprise it. Dōgen then engages in his characteristic wordplay by rearranging the characters of the term, speaking of "old Buddha", "old mind", and even the strange expression "Buddha old". To conclude, he cites Jianyuan Zhongxing, who said that "old buddha mind" is the same as "the world collapses in ruins", before finally putting this phrase in his own terms, writing that the old buddha mind must be "sloughed off" to really know the old buddha mind. He also reiterates that the old buddha mind extends to times both before and after the Seven Buddhas of Antiquity.
