= Zhengfa Yanzang =

Buddhist book by Dahui Zonggao

- Original title: 正法眼藏
- Publication place: China
- Media type: Print

The Zhengfa Yanzang (Chinese: 正法眼藏; Pinyin: Zhèngfǎ Yǎnzàng; Romaji: Shōbōgenzō), known in English as the Treasury of the Correct Dharma Eye or by the Japanese reading of its title, Shōbōgenzō, is a collection of gong'ans (kōans in Japanese) compiled by Dahui Zonggao. Dahui was a famous popularizer of gong'ans during the Song dynasty in China. Dahui's collection is composed of three scrolls prefaced by three short introductory pieces. Dahui's work uses the same Chinese characters for its title as the now well known Shōbōgenzō written by the Japanese monk Eihei Dōgen in the thirteenth century. Upon arriving in China, Dōgen first studied under Wuji Lepai, a disciple of Dahui, which is where he probably came into contact with Dahui's Zhengfa Yanzang. In his book Dogen's Manuals of Zen Meditation, the modern scholar Carl Bielefeldt acknowledges that Dōgen likely took the title from Dahui for his own kōan collection, the Shinji Shōbōgenzō, and kept it for his later and now most well-known work, the Kana Shōbōgenzō (usually referred to simply as "the Shōbōgenzō"):

Indeed the fact that Dōgen styled his effort "Shōbō genzō" suggests that he had as his model a similar compilation of the same title by the most famous of Sung masters, Ta-Hui Tsung-kao Dahui Zonggao.
