= Busshō (Shōbōgenzō) =

Third book of the Shōbōgenzō

Busshō (Japanese: 佛性), or Buddha Nature, is the third book of the Shōbōgenzō by the 13th century Sōtō Zen monk Eihei Dōgen. It was written in the fall of 1241 at Dōgen's monastery Kōshōhōrin-ji in Kyoto. As the title implies, the work is a discussion of the concept of buddha nature, laying out Dōgen's unique viewpoint on what the term means. While more typical interpretations see Buddha-nature as the inherent prospect of becoming a buddha, or alternatively a sort of life force within us, in Busshō Dōgen interprets Buddha-nature simply as concrete reality itself. He presents this thesis in his characteristically difficult style using frequent allusions to and comments on classical Zen literature, as well as complex word play hinging on creative interpretations of Classical Chinese sentence structure.

== Interpretations of buddha nature ==
The literature of Mahāyāna Buddhism includes many discussions and comments on the notion of buddha nature, and its exact meaning has been interpreted in numerous ways over many centuries. At is most basic, it can simply be synonymous with "buddha" or the qualities that make one a Buddha. More commonly, it is used to mean the potential to become a buddha, with common analogies likening buddha nature to a seed and a fully-fledged buddha to the mature plant. Finally, it may mean the absolute, fundamental nature of all things.

Dōgen begins his work by quoting the putative words of Shakyamuni Buddha as recorded in the Mahāyāna Mahāparinirvāṇa Sūtra stating that all living beings have buddha nature. He then equates this statement to a dialogue Dōgen often cites between Nanyue Huairang and his teacher Dajian Huineng in which they discuss the undefiled nature of "practice and verification" (Japanese: 修證; shushō), setting up his argument that buddha nature is just reality itself.
