= Shinji Shōbōgenzō =

The Shinji Shōbōgenzō or Mana Shōbōgenzō (真字正法眼蔵), literally the True Dharma Eye Treasury in Chinese Characters, is a collection of 300 kōans compiled by Eihei Dōgen from 1223–1227. "Shinji" and "Mana" are two alternative Japanese pronunciations of the Chinese characters "真字"; this literally means "true characters" and refers to its use of Classical Chinese as opposed to Classical Japanese, which is written using kana and is the language of Dōgen's more well known Kana Shōbōgenzō. It is also known informally as the Shōbōgenzō Sambyaku Soku (正法眼蔵三百則), the True Dharma Eye Treasury of Three Hundred Cases. The literary sources of the Shinji Shōbōgenzō are believed to have been The Jingde Record of the Transmission of the Lamp and the Shūmon Tōyōshū. It is written in Chinese, the language of the original texts from which the kōans were taken.

== Background ==
Regardless of a few instances where Dōgen criticized the study of kōans, legend states that the young monk stayed up all night copying the Blue Cliff Record before his journey China (although this story is likely apocryphal, given the great length of the text). Dōgen's first teacher, Eisai, taught the importance of kōan introspection. While establishing the Kōshōhōrin-ji, Dōgen gathered the three hundred kōans featured in the Shinji Shōbōgenzō.

== English translations ==
- Nishijima, Gudo Wafu (February 1, 2003). Master Dogen's Shinji Shobogenzo. Windbell Publications. ISBN 9780952300267.
- Loori, John Daido; Tanahashi, Kazuaki (December 13, 2005). The True Dharma Eye: Zen Master Dogen's Three Hundred Koans. Shambhala Publications. ISBN 9781590302422.

== See also ==
- Shōbōgenzō
- 101 Zen Stories
- The Gateless Gate
- Blue Cliff Record
- Book of Equanimity
