= Rempo Niwa =

Japanese Zen master (1905–1993)

- 丹羽 廉芳
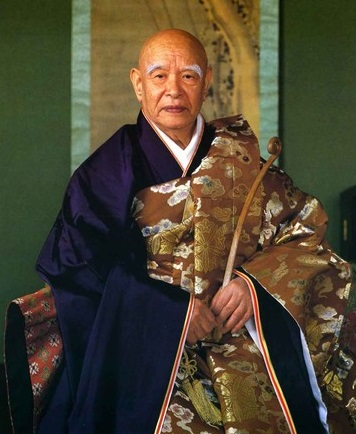
- Title: Zen Master

Personal life
- Born: February 23, 1905 Shizuoka Prefecture; Japan
- Died: September 7, 1993 (aged 88)
- Occupation: Buddhist monk

Religious life
- Religion: Zen Buddhism
- School: Sōtō

Zuigaku Rempo Niwa Zenji (1905–1993) was a Japanese Zen master.

He was born in Shizuoka Prefecture, Japan. His father was a schoolmaster and his mother was a farmer. After graduating from Tokyo University, he became the head official in Tokei-in and later studied at Antai-ji. At the age of 50, Niwa became the 77th abbot of the Eihei-ji monastery. He also received the imperial title of Jikô Enkai Zenji (“Great Zen Master of Compassion, Ocean of Plenitude”).

An avid practitioner of zazen, he rebuilt the zendo (meditation hall) so that the young people in training could better engage in this essential practice. His dharma heirs include Gudō Wafu Nishijima and Moriyama Daigyo as well as several teachers affiliated with the Taisen Deshimaru Lineage in Europe. Zenji (literally, "Zen Master") is an honorary title given to the senior Eihei temple (Eihei-ji), headquarters of the Sōtō school, founded in the thirteenth century by Master Dogen.

Outside of Zen, he created brush calligraphy. His work was often credited to various pseudonyms. Niwa died in 1993.
