= Bendōwa =

1231 Japanese Buddhist essay by Dōgen

Bendōwa (辨道話), meaning Discourse on the Practice of the Way or Dialogue on the Way of Commitment, sometimes also translated as Negotiating the Way, On the Endeavor of the Way, or A Talk about Pursuing the Truth, is an influential essay written by Dōgen, the founder of Zen Buddhism's Sōtō school in Japan.

== History and background ==
Bendōwa is Dogen's earliest known writing in Japanese. Although the text was written in 1231, making it the second piece he wrote following his return from China to Japan, it was not widely known for hundreds of years until the Kanbun Era (1661–1673), when it was found in a temple in Kyoto. In 1684, it was added in manuscript form by the monk Hangyo Kozen as the first fascicle of the 95-fascicle edition of Dōgen's already well-known master compilation, the Shōbōgenzō. This format was standardized in 1788 with its first major printed publication. Despite its four-century absence from the compilation, today it is often said that it "contains within it the essence of all ninety-five fascicles of Shōbōgenzō."

== Content ==
The essay primarily serves to introduce zazen 坐禅, or seated meditation, to Japanese Buddhists, very few of whom would have been exposed to the practice. According to Gudo Nishijima, one of the many translators of the text into English, Dōgen often used bendō to mean the practice of zazen specifically, despite the fact that ben (辨) literally means pursuit and dō (道) means way or truth. The title can also thus be interpreted as A Talk on the Practice of Zazen. Divided into two sections, the first argues for the preeminence of zazen before other forms of Buddhist practice, explains the meaning of ji juyū zanmai 自受用三昧 (or ji juyū samādhi), and tells of his travels in China.

Ji juyū zanmai can be translated loosely as "samādhi of self-fulfillment and enjoyment" or literally as the "samādhi of receiving and using the self." Kosho Uchiyama comments, ". . . we can understand this samādhi of self-fulfillment and enjoyment as the samādhi or concentration on the self when it simply receives and accepts its function, or its spiritual position in the world," while Nishijima writes that it "suggests the state of natural balance which we experience when making effort without an intentional aim."

In the remaining text, which adopts a question-and-answer format, Dōgen answers questions put forward by an archetypical novice Zen student.

== See also ==
- Shōbōgenzō
- Genjōkōan
- Tenzo Kyōkun
