= Genjōkōan =

1233 essay on Zen written by Dōgen

Genjōkōan (現成公按), translated by Tanahashi as Actualizing the Fundamental Point, is an influential essay written by Dōgen, the founder of Zen Buddhism's Sōtō school in Japan. It is considered one of the most popular essays in Shōbōgenzō.

== History and background ==
Genjōkōan was written for a lay practitioner named Koshu Yō in 1233.

== Title ==
According to Taigen Dan Leighton "The word genjo means to fully or completely manifest, or to express or share. And in this context koan does not refer to these teaching stories, but to the heart of the matter."

Shohaku Okumura says that Gen means "to appear", "to show up," or "to be in the present moment" while Jo means "to become," "to complete," or "to accomplish." The combined word genjō therefore means "to manifest," "to actualize," or "to appear and become."

Hakuun Yasutani wrote: "...[C]oncerning the word genjōkoan, genjō is phenomena. It's the whole universe. It's all mental and physical phenomena.... Kōan is derived from the word official document, and is meant to mean the unerring absolute authority of the Buddha-dharma. So then, genjōkōan means that the subjective realm and the objective realm, the self and all things in the universe, are nothing but the true Buddha-dharma itself."

== Content ==
Genjōkōan begins with an explanation of Zen and then goes on to elucidate delusion and realization, wholehearted practice, and the relationship of self to realization and environment.

Thomas Cleary states that Genjōkōan begins with an outline of Zen using a presentation of the Five Ranks claiming that Dogen used the device throughout his Shōbōgenzō. Shohaku Okumura says that in Genjōkōan "Dogen created a metaphor to express the reality of individuality and universality."

== See also ==
- Shōbōgenzō
- Bendōwa
- Tenzo Kyōkun
