= Zazen shin =

Historic Japanese text

== History ==
Zazen shin (Japanese: 坐禪箴), rendered in English as the Acupuncture Needle of Zazen, Lancet of Zazen, or Needle for Zazen, is a book belonging to the Shōbōgenzō (正法眼蔵, lit. "Treasury of the True Dharma Eye"), the collection of works written in Japan by the 13th century Buddhist monk and founder of the Sōtō Zen school, Eihei Dōgen. It was written on the 19th of April, 1242 at Dōgen's monastery Kōshōhōrin-ji in Kyoto. The book appears as the 12th book in the 75 fascicle version of the Shōbōgenzō, and it is ordered 27th in the later chronological 95 fascicle Honzan editions. The title Zazen shin refers to a poem of the same title written by Hongzhi Zhengjue. Hongzhi's poem is quoted verbatim in Dōgen's Zazen shin and also presented again in modified form later in the text.

== Contents ==
The Zazen shin lays what Dōgen sees as the vital importance of Zazen (Japanese: 坐禅, lit. “Sitting meditation”) to his school of Buddhism. Dōgen emphasises in Zazen shin that Zazen is not a way to become the Buddha, but rather a practice used by the enlightened to focus on the present. Rather than being seen as a way to become enlightened, he argues that it is something that the enlightened do. Later in the text Dōgen comments on the story of Chan master Mazu Daoyi who likened trying to become a Buddha through meditation with polishing clay tile to make a mirror, something which is impossible and does not make sense. The final part of the work is Dōgen's commentary on Hongzhi Zhengjue's poem, and Dōgens own version of that poem.
