= Tenzo =

Buddhist title

Tenzo (Japanese: 典座) is a title given to the chef at a Buddhist monastery. The word tenzo is Japanese for "seat of ceremony", similar to the English term "master of ceremonies."

From ancient times Buddhist monasteries have had six office-holders who, as disciples of the Buddha, guide the monastic community. Amongst these, the tenzo bears the responsibility of caring for the community's meals. The Pure Standards of the Chan Monastery states; "The tenzo functions as the one who makes offerings with reverence to the monks."

Since ancient times this office has been held by realized monks or by senior disciples who have roused the enlightened. Those entrusted with this work but who lack a disciplined mind will only cause and endure hardship despite all their efforts. The Zen Monastic Standards states; "Putting the mind of the Way to work, serve carefully varied meals appropriate to each occasion and thus allow everyone to practice without hindrance."

The Tenzo does much more than a "cook" does. It is one of the most demanding positions. The Tenzo prepares meal plans for Sesshin, making sure all the ingredients are present. The vast majority of food comes from takuhatsu. It means the vegetables are not prime choice, not really "fresh" as sold in stores. It is the job of the Tenzo to provide nutritional meals from the donations received from takuhatsu.

== See also ==
- Sesshin
- Dai Bosatsu Zendo Kongo-ji
