= Kazuaki Tanahashi =

Japanese calligrapher, Zen teacher, author and translator

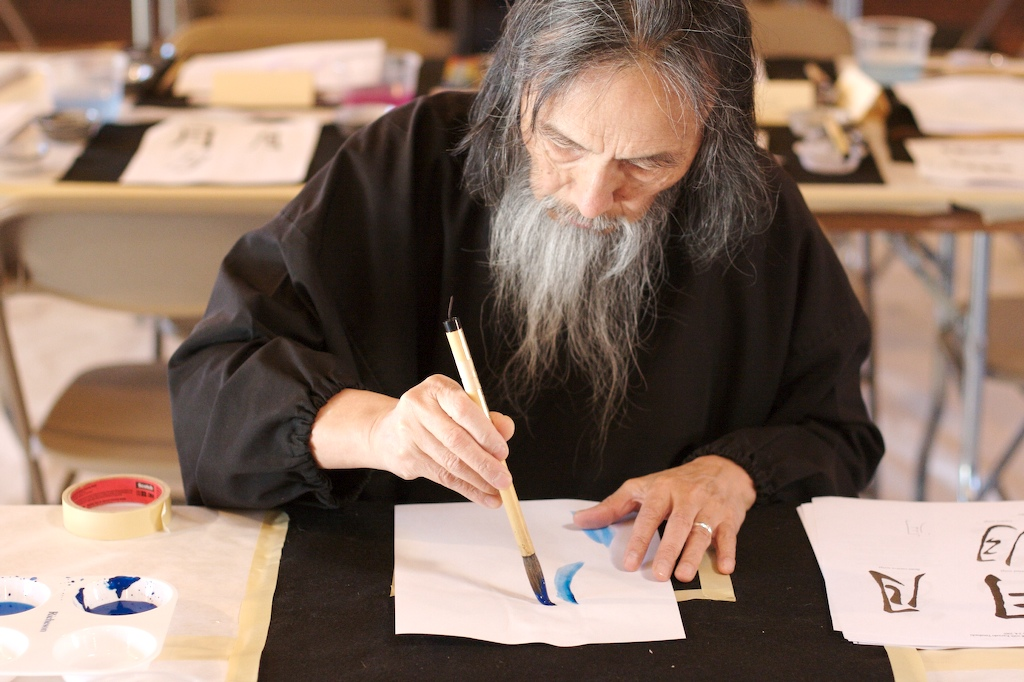
- Title: Sensei

Personal life
- Born: October 4, 1933 (age 92)
- Other name: Kaz
- Occupation: Calligrapher
- Website: www.brushmind.net/

Religious life
- Religion: Zen Buddhism

Kazuaki Tanahashi (棚橋一晃; born October 4, 1933) is an accomplished Japanese calligrapher, Zen teacher, author and translator of Buddhist texts from Japanese and Chinese to English, most notably works by Dogen (he began his translation of Shobogenzo in his twenties). He first met Shunryu Suzuki in 1964, and upon reading Suzuki's book Zen Mind, Beginner's Mind he stated, "I could see it's Shobogenzo in a very plain, simple language." He has helped notable Zen teachers author books on Zen Buddhism, such as John Daido Loori. A fellow of the World Academy of Art and Science—Tanahashi is also an environmentalist and peaceworker.

== Gallery ==
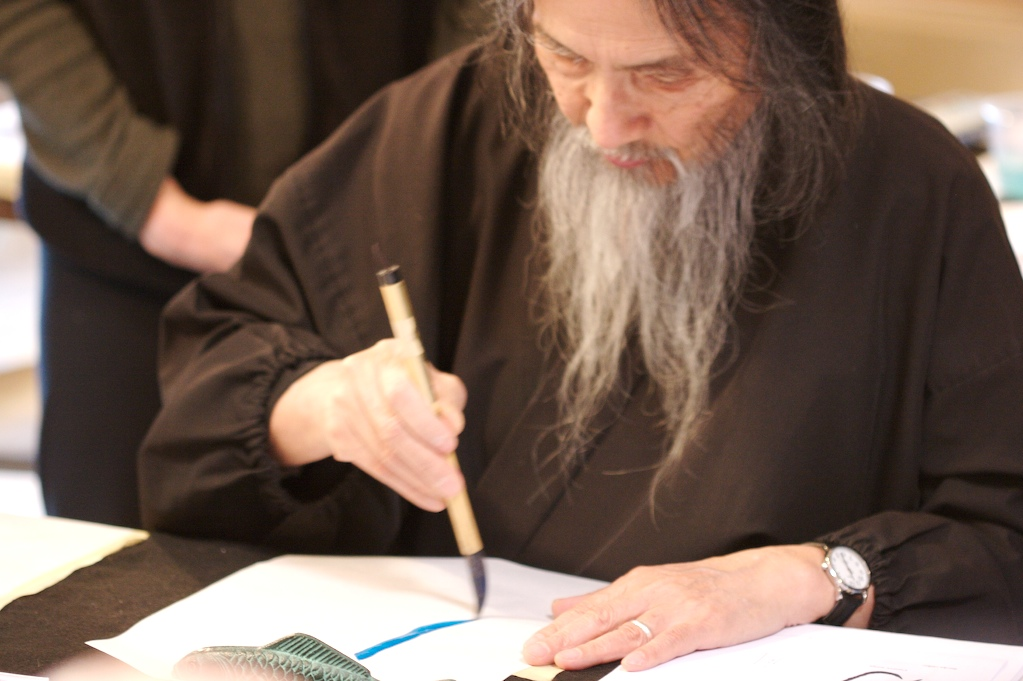

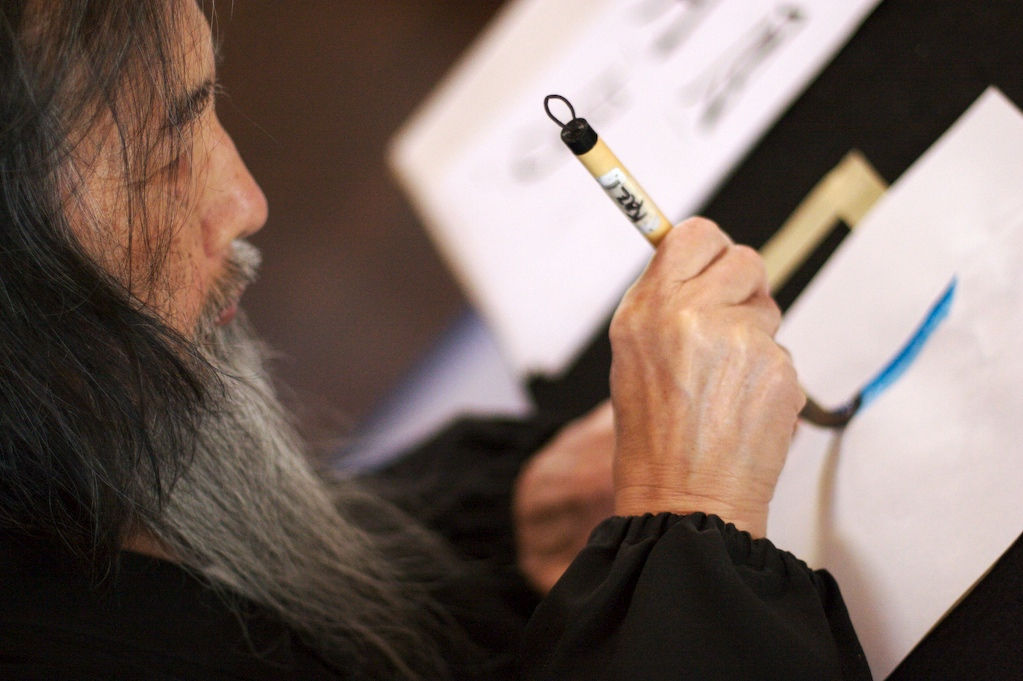

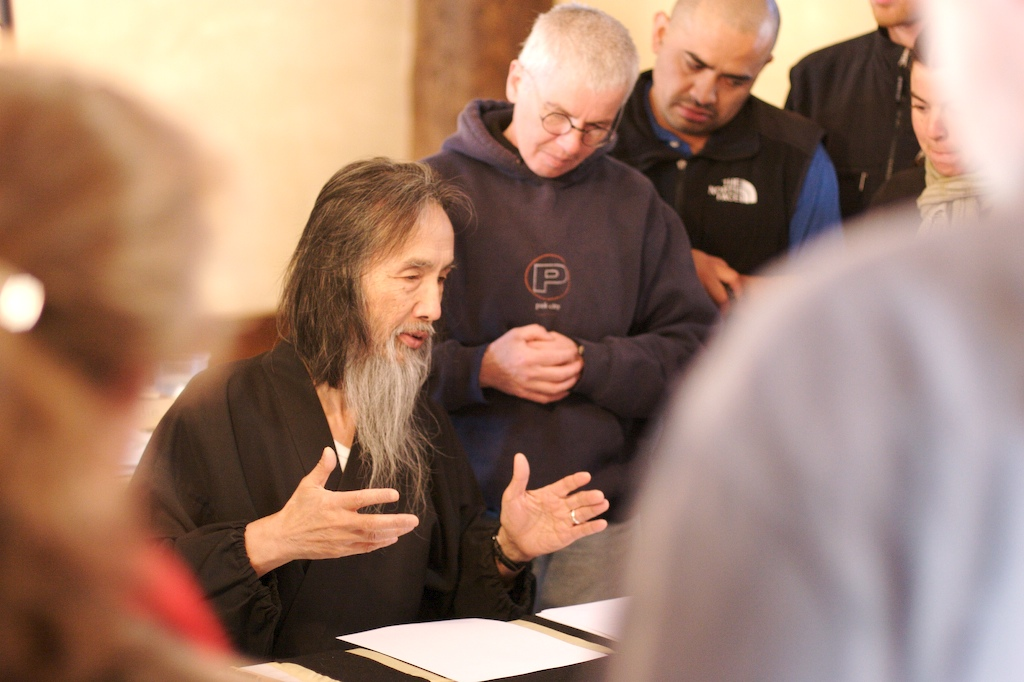

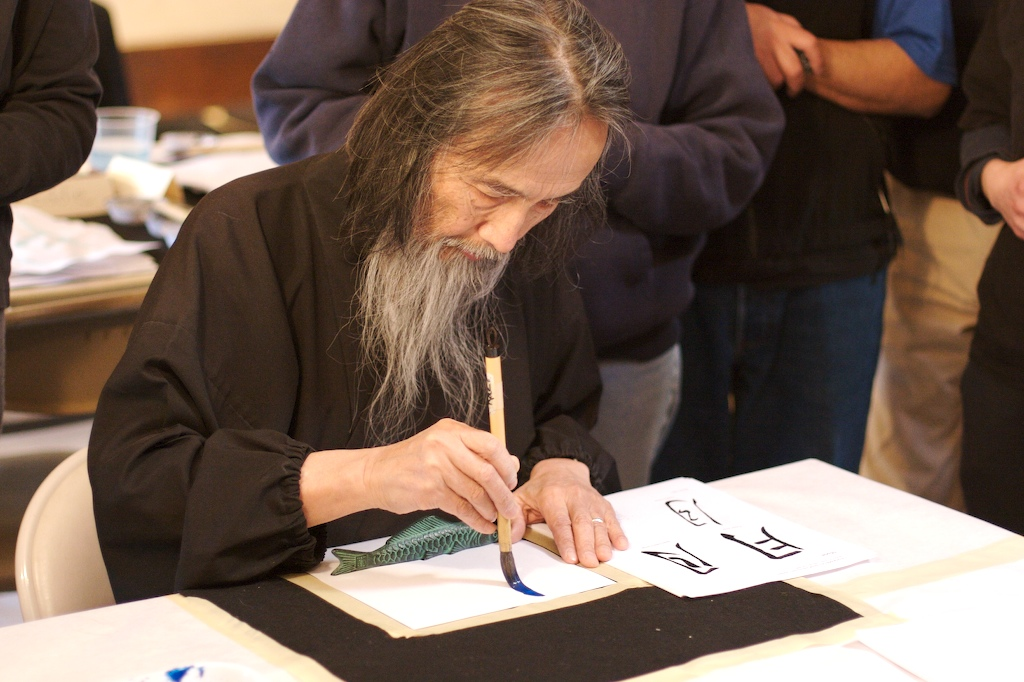

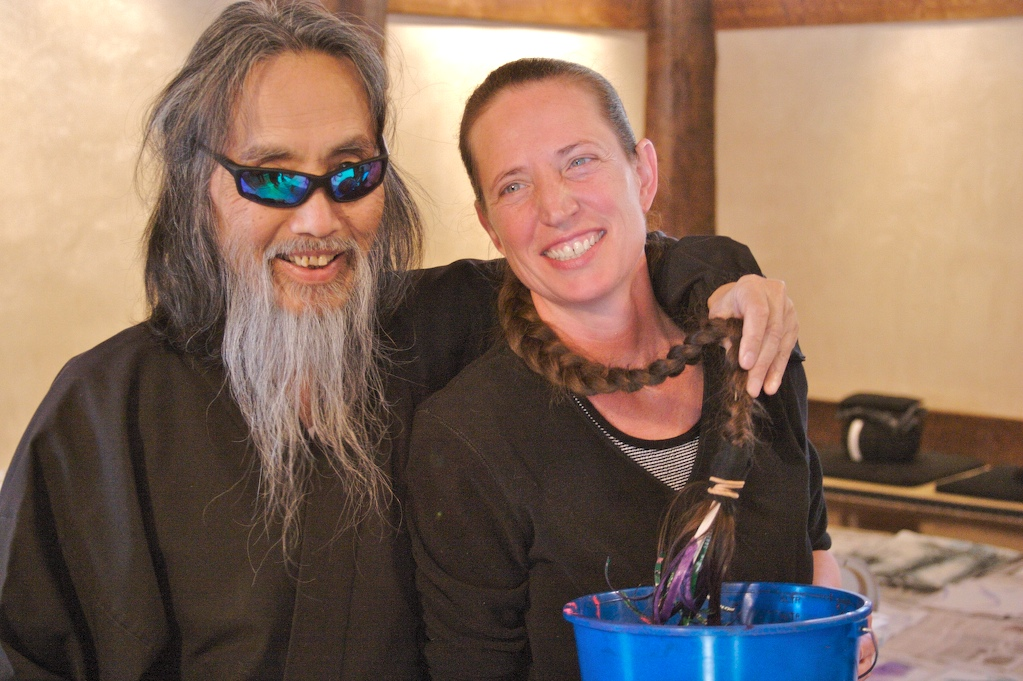

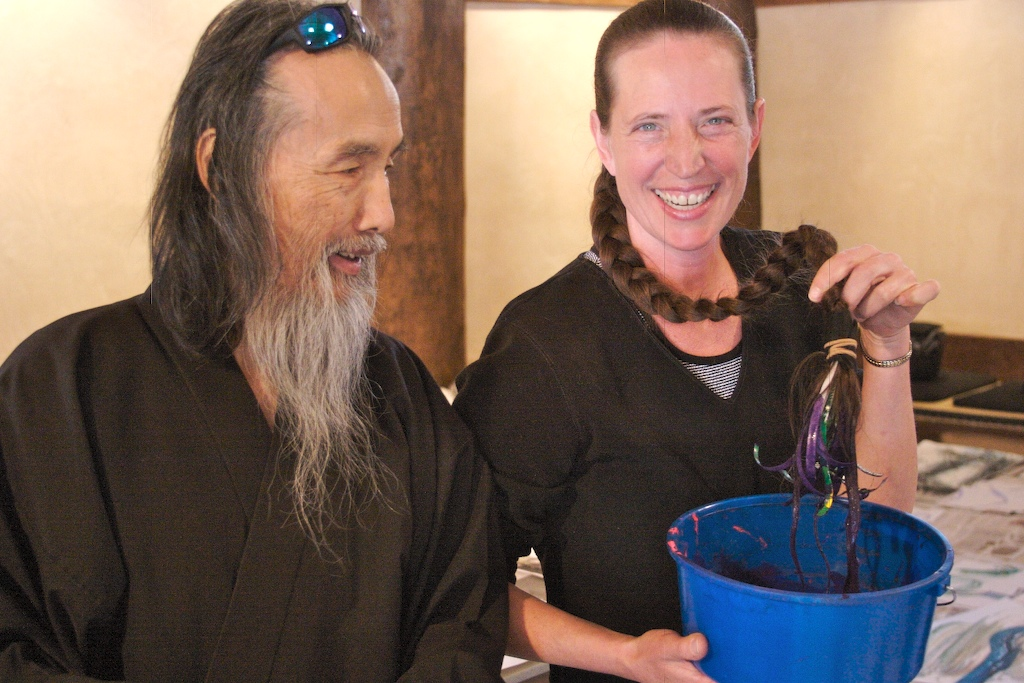

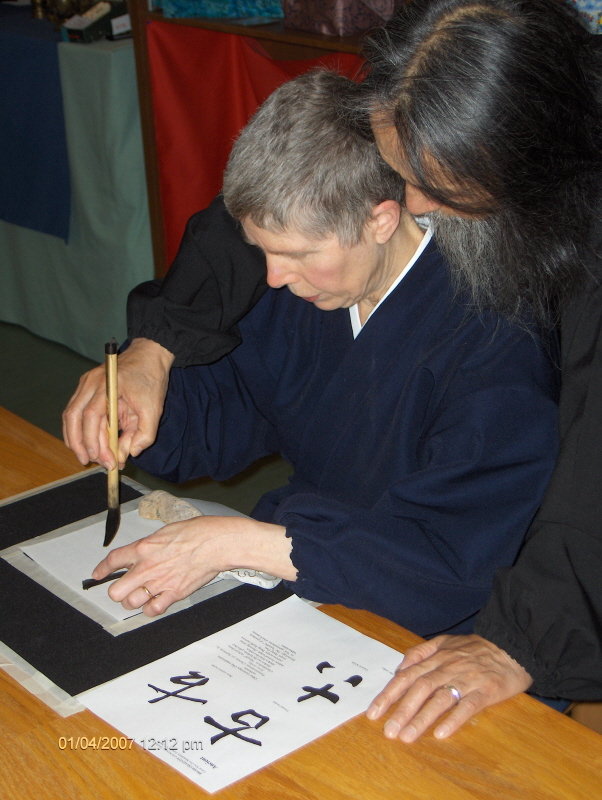
Jan Chozen Bays & Tanahashi

== Bibliography ==
- Tanahashi, Kazuaki (2018). Painting Peace: Art in a Time of Global Crisis. Shambhala Publications. ISBN 9781611805437.
- Tanahashi, Kazuaki (2016). Heart of the Brush: The Splendor of East Asian Calligraphy. Shambhala Publications. ISBN 9781611801347.
- Tanahashi, Kazuaki (2015). Zen Chants: Thirty-Five Essential Texts with Commentary. Shambhala Publications. ISBN 9781611801439.
- Tanahashi, Kazuaki (2015). The Heart Sutra: A Comprehensive Guide to the Classic of Mahayana Buddhism. Shambhala Publications. ISBN 9781611800968.
- Tanahashi, Kazuaki (2012). Sky Above, Great Wind: The Life and Poetry of Zen Master Ryokan. Shambhala Publications. ISBN 978-1-59030-982-7.
- Tanahashi, Kazuaki (2011). Treasury of the True Dharma Eye: Zen Master Dogen's Shōbōgenzō. Shambhala Publications. ISBN 978-1590304747.
- Tanahashi, Kazuaki (2006). Lotus. Wisdom Publications. ISBN 0-86171-277-3.
- Lao Tzu (2005). The Tao te Ching: A New Translation. Translated by Hamill, Sam. Kazuaki Tanahashi (calligraphy). Shambhala Publications. ISBN 1-59030-011-4.
- Loori, John Daido (2005). The True Dharma Eye: Zen Master Dogen's Three Hundred Koans. Kazuaki Tanahashi (trans.). Shambhala. ISBN 1-59030-242-7.
- Tanahashi, Kazuaki; Peter Levitt (2004). A Flock of Fools: Ancient Buddhist Tales of Wisdom and Laughter from the One Hundred Parable Sutra. Grove Press. ISBN 0-8021-4133-1.
- Dogen (2004). Tanahashi, Kazuaki (ed.). Beyond Thinking: A Guide to Zen Meditation. Shambhala Publications. ISBN 1-59030-024-6.
- Tanahashi, Kazuaki (2001). Miracles of the Moment. Brush Dance. ISBN 1-891731-83-1.
- Tanahashi, Kazuaki; Dogen (1999). Enlightenment Unfolds. Shambhala Publications. ISBN 1-57062-570-0.
- Dogen (1995). Moon In a Dewdrop. Tanahashi, Kazuaki (Translator, Editor). North Point Press. ISBN 0-86547-186-X.
- Tanahashi, Kazuaki; David Schneider (1994). Essential Zen. HarperSanFrancisco. ISBN 0-06-251046-0.
- Tanahashi, Kazuaki (1990). Brush Mind. Parallax Press. ISBN 0-938077-29-5.
- Tanahashi, Kazuaki (1984). Penetrating Laughter: Hakuin's Zen and Art. The Overlook Press. ISBN 0-87951-280-6.
- Tanahashi (1982). Enku: Sculptor of a Hundred Thousand Buddhas. Shambhala Publications. ISBN 0-394-74882-4.
- Ueshiba, Morihei (1962). Aikido. Translated by Kaizuaki Tanahashi; Roy Maurer Jr. Hozansha.
