= Ango =

Concept of Japanese Buddhism

An ango (安居), or kessei (結制), is a Japanese term for a three-month period of intense training for students of Zen Buddhism, lasting anywhere from 90 to 100 days. The practice during ango consists of meditation (zazen), study, and work (samu (作務)).

Ango is typically held twice a year, the first period from spring to summer and the second period from fall to winter. The word ango literally translates as "dwelling in peace"; the summer ango is referred to as ge-ango (夏安居) or u-ango (雨安居) and the winter period is referred to as tō-ango (冬安居) or setsu-ango (雪安居). Additionally, some monasteries and Zen centers hold just one ango per year.

Concerning Zen practice in the United States, author Ellen Birx writes,

Many centers now allow members to attend retreats on a part-time basis. Many have ango, a three-month-long period of intensified practice, that members can participate in while continuing to go off to work during the day." Taigen Dan Leighton writes a more traditional definition, "These are ninety-day training periods of concentrated practice without leaving the monastic enclosure (except for monks going out for necessary temple business). They date back to the summer rainy season retreats of Shakyamuni's time. In Japan, they have been held twice a year, summer and winter."

== See also ==
- Kyol Che
- Sesshin
- Zazen
- Vassa
