= Shōbōgenzō =

Literary work

Shōbōgenzō (正法眼蔵; Japanese pronunciation: [ɕoː.boː ɡen.dzoː], lit. 'Treasury of the True Dharma Eye') is the title most commonly used to refer to the collection of works written in Japan by the 13th-century Buddhist monk and founder of the Sōtō Zen school in Japan, Eihei Dōgen. Several other works exist with the same title (see above), and it is sometimes called the Kana Shōbōgenzō in order to differentiate it from those. The term shōbōgenzō can also be used more generally as a synonym for Buddhism as viewed from the perspective of Mahayana Buddhism.

== Source of the title ==
=== Shōbōgenzō as a general term ===
In Mahayana Buddhism, the term True Dharma Eye Treasury (Japanese: Shōbōgenzō) refers generally to the Buddha Dharma; and in Zen Buddhism, it specifically refers to the realization of Buddha's awakening that is not contained in the written words of the sutras.

In general Buddhist usage, the term "treasury of the Dharma" refers to the written words of the Buddha's teaching collected in the Sutras as the middle of the Three Treasures of the Buddha, Dharma, and Sangha. In Zen, however, the real treasure of the Dharma is not to be found in books but in one's own Buddha Nature and the ability to see this Correct View (first of the Noble Eightfold Path) of the treasure of Dharma is called the "Treasure of the Correct Dharma Eye".

In the legends of the Zen tradition, the Shōbōgenzō has been handed down from teacher to student going all the way back to the Buddha when he transmitted the Shobogenzo to his disciple Mahākāśyapa thus beginning the Zen lineage that Bodhidharma brought to China.

The legend of the transmission of the Shōbōgenzō to Mahākāśyapa is found in several Zen texts and is one of the most referred to legends in all the writings of Zen. Among the famous koan collections, it appears as Case 6 in the Wumenguan (The Gateless Checkpoint) and Case 2 in the Denkoroku (Transmission of Light). In the legend as told in the Wumenguan, the Buddha holds up a flower and no one in the assembly responds except for Arya Kashyapa who gives a broad smile and laughs a little. Seeing Mahākāśyapa's smile the Buddha said,

I possess the Treasury of the Correct Dharma Eye, the wonderful heart-mind of Nirvana, the formless true form, the subtle Dharma gate, not established by written words, transmitted separately outside the teaching. I hand it over and entrust these encouraging words to Kashyapa.

=== Dahui's Shōbōgenzō and Dōgen's Shinji Shōbōgenzō ===
Dahui Zonggao, the famous 12th-century popularizer of koans in Song dynasty China, wrote a collection of kōans with the Chinese title Zhengfa Yanzang (正法眼藏). In Japanese this is read as Shōbōgenzō, using the same kanji for its title as Dōgen's later work. When Dōgen visited China in 1223, he first studied under Wuji Lepai, a disciple of Dahui, which is where he probably first came into contact with Dahui's Zhengfa Yanzang. In his book Dogen's Manuals of Zen Meditation, the modern scholar Carl Bielefeldt acknowledges that Dōgen likely took the title from Dahui for his own kōan collection, known now as the Shinji Shōbōgenzō. He later used the same title again for what is now his most well-known work, the Kana Shōbōgenzō (now almost always referred to simply as "the Shōbōgenzō"):

Indeed the fact that Dōgen styled his effort "Shōbō genzō" suggests that he had as his model a similar compilation of the same title by the most famous of Sung masters, Ta-Hui Tsung-kao [Dahui Zonggao]. Unlike the latter, Dōgen was content here simply to record the stories without interjecting his own remarks. A few years later, however, he embarked on a major project to develop extended commentaries on many of these and other passages from the Ch'an literature. The fruit of this project was his masterpiece--the remarkable collection of essays known as the kana, or "vernacular", Shōbō genzō.

== Compilation of the Shōbōgenzō ==
The different component texts—referred to as fascicles—of the Kana Shōbōgenzō were written between 1231 and 1253—the year of Dōgen's death (Dōgen, 2002, p. xi). Unlike most Zen writings originating in Japan at that time, including Dōgen's own Shinji Shōbōgenzō and Eihei Koroku, which were written in Classical Chinese, the Kana Shōbōgenzō was written in Japanese. The essays in Shōbōgenzō were delivered as sermons in a less formal style than the Chinese language sermons of the Eihei Koroku. Some of the fascicles were recorded by Dōgen, while others were recorded by his disciples.

Dōgen rearranged the order of the fascicles that make up the Shōbōgenzō several times during his own lifetime, and also edited the content of individual fascicles. After his death, various editors added and removed fascicles to make different versions of the Shōbōgenzō. In pre-modern times there were four major versions that consisted of 60, 75, 12, and 28 fascicles, with the 60-fascicle version being the earliest and the 28-fascicle version the latest. The first two were arranged by Dōgen himself, with the 75-fascicle version containing several fascicles that had been edited from the earlier 60-fascicle version. Several copies of both the 60- and 75-fascicle versions exist, including one containing Dōgen's handwriting and that of his student, Koun Ejō. On the other hand, the 12-fascicle version, also known as the Yōkōji manuscript after the temple where it was found in 1936, is known from only two examples, one copied in 1420 and the other recopied from that in 1446. This version contains 5 fascicles not found in the older versions, including the only surviving manuscript of Ippyakuhachi Hōmyō Mon'. It also contains a note at the end of Hachi Dainin Gaku written by Koun Ejō indicating that it was to be the last fascicle of a 100-fascicle version; this was never completed due to Dōgen's illness near the end of his life. It is unclear which chapters this 100-fascicle version would have included and in what order. Finally, the 28-fascicle version, also known as the Eihei-ji manuscript or the "Secret Shōbōgenzō" (Japanese: Himitsu Shōbōgenzō), dates from the mid-1300s and actually only contains 26 fascicles because Shin Fukatoku appears twice and Butsudō is included twice in two different versions. The fascicles of the Eihei-ji manuscript were taken from the 75- and 12-fascicle versions and still retain the numbering system used from their source collections. Yoibutsu Yobutsu is an exception and is numbered as fascicle 38, which does not correspond to any extant version.

Other pre-modern versions of the Shōbōgenzō exist, all of which were rearrangements of the four main versions discussed above, often with additional material from Dōgen that he did not intend to include. Bonsei, who died in the early 15th century, created an 84-fascicle version consisting of the 75-fascicle version plus 9 books from the 60-fascicle version. Four copies of Bonsei's collection survive, with the oldest dating from 1644. An 89-fascicle version called the Daijōji manuscript was put together in 1689 by Manzan Dōhaku based on Bonsei's version of 84 plus 5 additional fascicles, including Bendōwa, Jūundō Shiki, and Jikuin Mon, which were not previously considered part of the Shōbōgenzō. He also ordered the books based on the date they were written and not on the order Dōgen intended, suggest he likely believed the ordering was a later decision not made by Dōgen himself. Hangyo Kōzen, aiming to make the most comprehensive version of the Shōbōgenzō, compiled a 96-fascicle version called the Komazawa University Library manuscript containing every known book from previous versions except Ippyakuhachi Hōmyō Mon. It also included more additional writings, including the apocryphal Chinzo and several variant versions of other chapters. Kōzen's version became the basis for the first printed version of the Shōbōgenzō, the Honzan edition. Finally, a 78-book version was made by Tenkei Denson while he was preparing his commentary, Benchū, on the text. He thought that the 60-fascicle version was compiled by Giun and was the oldest, most correct version, and as result his version is identical for the first 59 fascicles except for two replacements from other versions and one combination of two fascicles into one. The remainder is added from the 12- and 75-fascicle versions with 10 fascicles from those being specifically excluded.

Modern editions of Shōbōgenzō contain 95 fascicles based on the late-17th-century 96-fascicle version of Hangyo Kozen, the 35th abbot of Dōgen's monastery Eihei-ji. This began as a 90-fascicle version, the first to be printed on woodblocks rather than hand copied, beginning in 1815 and known as the Honzan edition. The six fascicles that were removed included the inauthentic Chinzo as well as five chapters regarded as secrets of the Sōtō School. The original woodblocks are now stored at Eihei-ji. In 1906 the revised Honzan version of 95 fascicles including the five "secret" chapters was published. The only chapter originally intended to be part of the Shōbōgenzō missing from the revised Honzan version at this stage was Ippyakuhachi Hōmyō Mon because it was not discovered until 1936. In 1929, the Sōtōshū Zensho edition was released adding back Chinzo. It was removed again in a revised edition in 1970, and then added again in the 1974 Zoku Sōtōshū Zensho along with Ippyakuhachi Hōmyō Mon. Many other versions were made in the 20th century, some of which indiscriminately combined sections from different manuscripts. Today, arguably the most faithful printed version in Japanese is the 1988 edition compiled by Kōdō Kawamura consisting of the original 75-fascicle version from the single 1547 Ryūmonji manuscript, the 12-fascicle 1446 Yōkōji manuscript, nine uncollected works not originally intended for the Shōbōgenzō, and initial drafts of seven chapters.

== History of textual analysis ==
The earliest commentaries on the Shōbōgenzō were written by two of Dōgen's disciples, Yōkō Senne and Kyōgō. Kyōgō compiled two commentaries on the 75-fascicle version of Dōgen's Shōbōgenzō, the first of which is called Shōbōgenzō shō (正法眼蔵抄) and the second Shōbōgenzō gokikigaki (正法眼蔵御聴書). Collectively, they are called Gokikigakishō (御聴書抄), which is usually abbreviated as Goshō (御抄). Senne is believed to be the author of the Shōbōgenzō Gokikigaki due to the use of the honorific modifier go (御), which would not normally be used to refer to one's own writing. The Gokikigaki contains a date of 1263, suggesting Senne may have completed it around that time. Kyōgō began his Shōbōgenzō shō in 1303 and completed it in 1308. There is no evidence that these commentaries were widely read at the time they were produced. In fact, the first time the Goshō is known to be mentioned in historical documents is in 1586, when it was saved from a fire at Senpuku-ji, a temple in Oita Prefecture in Kyushu. The Buddhist studies scholar Genryū Kagamishima has written that Senne and Kyōgō's commentaries form the doctrinal core of the modern Sōtō Zen school.

Within a few generations of Dōgen's death, the historical record becomes mostly silent on textual engagement with Dōgen's work, including the Shōbōgenzō. Although most important Sōtō Zen temples had copies of one or more fascicles of the Shōbōgenzō, access was restricted to senior monks at that particular temple, making textual comparisons or compilations virtually impossible. Due to the many different recessions of the text—the 60-, 75-, 12-, 25-fascicle versions discussed above—scribal errors, and variant versions of individual fascicles, the Shōbōgenzō was thought to possibly be inauthentic at the beginning of a Tokugawa Era. In 1700, Manzan Dōhaku appealed to the authority of the Shōbōgenzō when petitioning the government's Agency of Temples and Shrines to abolish the temple-dharma lineage system (garanbō) which had arisen several generations after Dōgen's death and tied a monk's lineage not to his teacher, but to a temple. In 1703 the government not only agreed with Manzan, but proclaimed that the Sōtō school must base its practices on Dōgen's teachings. From this point, study and analysis of Shōbōgenzō greatly increased.

One of the earliest commentaries on the Shōbōgenzō was written by a monk named Tenkei Denson (1638–1735) in opposition to the emerging pro-Dōgen movement led by Manzan. Tenkei's commentary, called Benchū, was written from 1726 to 1729 using the 60-fascicle version. In it, he harshly criticized the text, rejected several fascicles altogether, and made extensive "corrections" and revisions to the source text. Mujaku Dōchū (1653–1744), a Rinzai monk, wrote a commentary from 1725 to 1726 that made many of the same points. Both Tenkei and Mujaku argued for a unity of all schools of Zen, but the Shōbōgenzō harshly criticized some approaches to Zen practice, especially those found in Rinzai lineages in China during Dōgen's life. Tenkei and Mujaku both also argued that Dōgen did not understand Chinese grammar based on his unusual interpretation of Chinese quotations. Tenkei also consulted Senne and Kyōgō's Goshō commentary discussed above, but rejected it.

Around the same time Menzan Zuihō was dedicating much of his life to analyzing the Shōbōgenzō in order to uncover Dōgen's source material. Menzan's student Fuzan and his students put this extensive study into writing in the 1770s. Menzan also made extensive use of Senne and Kyōgō's Goshō commentary in when studying the Shōbōgenzō, and he criticized Tenkei for having rejected it. Within a few years the monk Honkō made a commentary on the text and translated it into what was at the time the more respectable language of Classical Chinese. Commentaries were also made by the monks Zōkai and Rōran. An abridged collection of a variety of Dōgen's work appeared at this time called The Record of Eihei Dogen, which the famous poet Ryōkan wrote a verse on.

== English translations ==
There are now five complete English translations of the Kana Shobogenzo:

- Shōbōgenzō: The Eye and Treasury of the True Law, translated by Kōsen Nishiyama and John Stevens, published by Daihokkaikaku in 1975.
- Master Dogen's Shobogenzo, translated by Gudo Nishijima and Chodo Cross, published by Windbell Publications 1994–1999. This translation, under a different title, Shōbōgenzō: The True Dharma-Eye Treasury, is freely distributed digitally by Bukkyo Dendo Kyokai (BDK) with many other Mahāyāna texts.
- Shobogenzo: The Treasure House of the Eye of the True Teaching, translated by Hubert Nearman, free-released digitally by Shasta Abbey Press in 2007. Their old webpage for the Shobogenzo can be accessed on Archive.org.
- Treasury of the True Dharma Eye: Zen Master Dogen's Shobo Genzo, translated by Kazuaki Tanahashi and "a team of translators that represent a Who’s Who of American Zen", edited by Kazuaki Tanahashi and Associate Editor Peter Levitt, published by Shambhala in 2011.
- Treasury of the True Dharma Eye: Dōgen’s Shōbōgenzō, Eight-Volume Set, An Annotated Translation by the Sōtō Zen Text Project, published by the University of Hawai'i Press (Honolulu, HI) in 2025. This version supersedes the one published by Sōtōshū Shūmuchō (Soto Administrative Headquarters, Tokyo) in 2023. Produced by a team of scholars including Carl Bielefeldt, Griffith Foulk, William Bodiford, Stanley Weinstein, Sarah Horton and John McRae and accompanied by the Japanese texts and extensive annotation regarding the language, literary sources and interpretation. The eighth volume provides a lengthy study of the history and contents of the Shōbōgenzō, supplementary notes to the translation, and an extensive bibliography of primary and secondary works.

== Books of the Shōbōgenzō ==
=== The 60-fascicle version ===
Bold text indicates a fascicle not also included in the 75 fascicle version. An asterisk (*) indicates a fascicle not found in any other version.

1. Genjōkōan 現成公案
2. Maka hannya haramitsu 摩訶般若波羅蜜 The Great Perfection of Wisdom
3. Busshō 佛性 Buddha Nature
4. Shinjin gakudō 身心學道 Practicing the Way with the Body and Mind
5. Sokushin zebutsu 即心是佛 The Very Mind is Buddha
6. Gyōbutsu igi 行佛威儀 Deportment of the Practicing Buddha
7. Ikka myōju 一顆明珠 One Bright Pearl
8. **Sanji gō** 三時業
9. Kobutsushin 古佛心 The Old Buddha Mind
10. Daigo 大悟 Great Awakening
11. Zazen gi 坐禪儀 Principles of Zazen
12. ***Hokke ten hokke** 法華轉法華
13. Kaiin zanmai 海印三昧 The Ocean Seal Samadhi
14. Kūge 空華 Sky Flowers
15. Kōmyō 光明 Illuminating Wisdom
16. Gyōji (Part 1) 行持
17. Gyōji (Part 2)
  † In the 75 fascicle version, the text is not divided into two parts.
18. Kannon 觀音
19. Kokyō 古鏡 The Old Mirror
20. Uji 有時
21. Juki 授記 Conferring Predictions
22. Tsuki 都機 The Moon
23. Zenki 全機 Full Function
  † Zenki and Tsuki are reversed in the 75 fascicle version.
24. Gabyō 畫餅 Painted Cakes
25. Keisei sanshoku 谿聲山色 Sounds of the Valley, Forms of the Mountain
26. Bukkōjōji 佛向上事 What Is Beyond the Buddha
27. Muchū setsumu 夢中説夢
28. ***Bodaisatta shishōhō** 菩提薩埵四摂法
29. Inmo 恁麼 Being So
  † This appears 17th in the 75 fascicle version.
30. Kankin 看經 Sutra Reading
31. Shoaku makusa 諸悪莫作 Not Doing Evils
32. Sangai yuishin 三界唯心 The Three Realms Are Only Mind
  † This appears as the 41st in the 75 fascicle version.
33. Dōtoku 道得
34. **Hotsu bodai shin** 發心菩提
35. Jinzū 神通 Spiritual Powers
36. Arakan 阿羅漢 The Arhat
37. Henzan 徧參 Extensive Study
  † This appears 57th in the 75 fascicle version.
38. Kattō 葛藤 Twining Vines
39. **Shiba** 四馬
40. Hakujushi 柏樹子 The Cypress Tree
41. **Kesa kudoku** 袈裟功徳
42. Hou 鉢盂
  † From this point, the arrangement of the 60 and 75 fascicle versions differ substantially.
43. Kajō 家常 Everyday Matters
44. Ganzei 眼睛 The Eye
45. Jippō 十方 The Ten Directions
46. Mujō seppō 無情説法 The Insentient Preach the Dharma
47. Kenbutsu 見佛
48. Hosshō 法性 Dharma Nature
  † This fascicle up to Senmen are numbered the same in the 75 fascicle version.
49. Darani 陀羅尼 Dharani
50. Senmen 洗面
  † This fascicle was rewritten for the 75 fascicle version.
51. Ryūgin 龍吟 Song of the Dragon
  † This fascicle up to Nyorai zenshin are sequential in the 75 fascicle version as well.
52. Soshi seirai i 祖師西来意 The Intention of the Ancestral Master's Coming from the West
53. Hotsu mujō shin 發無上心 Bringing Forth the Supreme Mind
54. Udon ge 優曇華
55. Nyorai zenshin 如來全身
56. Kokū 虚空
57. Ango 安居
58. **Shukke kudoku** 出家功徳
59. **Kuyō shobutsu** 供養諸佛
60. **Kie buppōsō bō** 歸依佛法僧寶

=== The 75-fascicle version ===
Bold text indicates a fascicle not also included in the 60 fascicle version. An asterisk (*) indicates a fascicle not found in any other version.

1. Genjōkōan 現成公案
2. Maka hannya haramitsu 摩訶般若波羅蜜 The Perfection of Wisdom
3. Busshō 佛性 Buddha Nature
4. Shinjin gakudō 身心學道 Practicing the Way with the Body and Mind
5. Sokushin zebutsu 即心是佛 The Very Mind is Buddha
6. Gyōbutsu igi 行佛威儀 Deportment of the Practicing Buddha
7. Ikka myōju 一顆明珠 One Bright Pearl
8. **Shin fukatoku** 心不可得 The Mind Cannot Be Got
9. Kobutsushin 古佛心 The Old Buddha Mind
10. Daigo 大悟 Great Awakening
11. Zazen gi 坐禪儀 Principles of Zazen
12. ***Zazen shin** 坐禪箴 Lancet of Zazen
13. Kaiin zanmai 海印三昧 The Ocean Seal Samadhi
14. Kūge 空華 Sky Flowers
15. Kōmyō 光明 Illuminating Wisdom
16. Gyōji 行持 Continuous Practice
17. Inmo 恁麼 Being So
18. Kannon 觀音 Avalokiteśvara
19. Kokyō 古鏡 The Old Mirror
20. Uji 有時 Being-Time
21. Juki 授記 Conferring Predictions
22. Zenki 全機 Full Function
23. Tsuki 都機 The Moon
24. Gabyō 畫餅 Painted Cakes
25. Keisei sanshoku 谿聲山色 Sounds of the Valley, Forms of the Mountain
26. Bukkōjōji 佛向上事 What Is Beyond the Buddha
27. Muchū setsumu 夢中説夢 Expounding a Dream Within a Dream
28. **Raihai tokuzui** 禮拜得髓 Getting the Marrow by Doing Obeisance
29. **Sansui kyō** 山水經 The Mountains and Waters Sutra
30. Kankin 看經 Sutra Reading
31. Shoaku makusa 諸悪莫作 Not Doing Evils
32. **Den e** 傳衣 Transmitting the Robe
33. Dōtoku 道得 Able to Speak
34. **Bukkyō** 佛教 Buddha's Teaching
35. Jinzū 神通 Spiritual Powers
36. Arakan 阿羅漢 The Arhat
37. ***Shunjū** 春秋 Spring and Autumn
38. Kattō 葛藤 Twining Vines
39. **Shisho** 嗣書 Succession Record
40. Hakujushi 柏樹子 The Cypress Tree
41. Sangai yuishin 三界唯心 The Three Realms Are Only Mind
42. **Sesshin sesshō** 説心説性 Talking of the Mind, Talking of the Nature
43. **Shohō jissō** 諸法實相 True Reality of All Dharmas
44. **Butsudō** 佛道 The Way of the Buddha
45. **Mitsugo** 密語 Secret Language
46. Mujō seppō 無情説法 The Insentient Preach the Dharma
47. **Bukkyō** 佛經 Buddha's Sutras
48. Hosshō 法性 Dharma Nature
49. Darani 陀羅尼 Dharani
50. Senmen 洗面 Washing the Face
51. **Menju** 面授 Face to Face Transmission
52. **Busso** 佛祖 Buddhas and Ancestors
53. ***Baika** 梅華 Plum Flowers
54. ***Senjō** 洗淨Purification
55. Jippō 十方 The Ten Directions
56. Kenbutsu 見佛
57. Henzan 徧參 Extensive Study
58. Ganzei 眼睛 The Eye
59. Kajō 家常 Everyday Matters
60. **Sanjûshichihon bodai bunpō** 三十七品菩提分法 Thirty-seven Factors of Awakening
61. Ryūgin 龍吟 Song of the Dragon
62. Soshi seirai i 祖師西来意 The Intention of the Ancestral Master's Coming from the West
63. Hotsu mujō shin 發無上心 Bringing Forth the Supreme Mind
64. Udon ge 優曇華 Udumbara Flower
65. Nyorai zenshin 如來全身
66. **Zanmai ō zanmai** 三昧王三昧 The King of Samadhis Samadhi
67. **Ten hōrin** 轉法輪 Turning the Dharma Wheel
68. **Dai shugyō** 大修行 Great Practice
69. **Jishō zanmai** 自證三昧 The Samadhi of Self Verification
70. Kokū 虚空 Empty Space
71. Hou 鉢盂 Almsbowl
72. Ango 安居 Practice Period
73. ***Tashin tsū** 佗心通 Penetration of Other Minds
74. **Ō saku sendaba** 王索仙陀婆 A King Seeks Necessities in Saindhava
75. **Shukke** 出家 Leaving Home

=== The 12-fascicle version ===
Bold text indicates a fascicle not also included in the 60 fascicle version. An asterisk (*) indicates a fascicle not found in any other version. Note than no fascicles from the 12 fascicle version appear in the 75 fascicle version.

1. Shukke kudoku 出家功徳
2. **Jukai** 受戒 Taking Vows/Ordination
3. Kesa kudoku 袈裟功徳
4. Hotsu bodai shin 發心菩提
5. Kuyō shobutsu 供養諸佛
6. Kie buppōsō bō 歸依佛法僧寶
7. **Jinshin inga** 深信因果 Deep Belief in Cause and Effect
8. ***Sanji gō** 三時業
  † This fascicle was rewritten; it differs from 60 fascicle version.
9. Shiba 四馬
10. **Shizen biku** 四禪比丘
11. ***Ippyakuhachi hōmyō mon** 一百八法明門
12. **Hachi dainin gaku** 八大人覺

=== The 28-fascicle version ===
Bold text indicates a fascicle not also included in the 75 fascicle version. An asterisk (*) indicates a fascicle not found in any other version.

1. Bukkōjōji 佛向上事 What Is Beyond the Buddha
  † This fascicle is found in both the 60 and 75 fascicle versions.
2. ***Shōji** 生死 Birth and Death
3. Shin fukatoku 心不可得 The Mind Cannot Be Got
  † This is the same text found in the 75 fascicle version.
4. ***Go shin fukatoku** 後心不可得
  † This differs from the text in the 75 fascicle version.
5. **Jinshin inga** 深信因果 Deep Belief in Cause and Effect
6. Shohō jissō 諸法實相 True Reality of All Dharmas
7. ***Butsudō (variant)** 佛道 The Way of the Buddha
  † This differs from the version found in the 75 fascicle version; it was called Dōshin 道心 by later compilers.
8. ***Raihai tokuzui (variant)** 禮拜得髓 Getting the Marrow by Doing Obeisance
  † This differs from the version found in the 75 fascicle version.
9. Butsudō 佛道 The Way of the Buddha
  † This is the same text found in the 75 fascicle version.
10. Zanmai ō zanmai 三昧王三昧 The King of Samadhis Samadhi
11. Sanjûshichihon bodai bunpō 三十七品菩提分法 Thirty-seven Factors of Awakening
12. Den e 傳衣 Transmitting the Robe
13. Bukkyō 佛教 Buddha's Teaching
14. Sansui kyō 山水經 The Mountains and Waters Sutra
15. Mitsugo 密語 Secret Language
16. Ten hōrin 轉法輪 Turning the Dharma Wheel
17. Jishō zanmai 自證三昧 The Samadhi of Self Verification
18. Dai shugyō 大修行 Great Practice
19. Shisho 嗣書 Succession Record
20. **Hachi dainin gaku** 八大人覺 Eight Awakenings of Great Beings
21. **Jukai** 受戒Taking Vows/Ordination
22. Busso 佛祖 Buddhas and Ancestors
23. **Shizen biku** 四禪比丘
24. Shukke 出家 Leaving Home
25. Bukkyō 佛經 Buddha's Sutras
26. Menju 面授 Face to Face Transmission
27. Sesshin sesshō 説心説性 Expounding Mind, Expounding Nature
28. ***Yuibutsu Yobutsu** 唯佛與佛 Only A Buddha Together With A Buddha

=== Fascicles not originally included in Shōbōgenzō ===
- Bendōwa 辨道話
- Jūundō shiki 重雲堂式
- Ji kuin mon 示庫院文

== See also ==
- Bendōwa
- Genjōkōan
- Daigo
- Shinji Shōbōgenzō
