= Eihei Kōroku =

Collection of works

Eihei Kōroku (Japanese: 永平広録), also known by its English translation Dōgen's Extensive Record, is a ten volume collection of works by the Sōtō Zen monk Eihei Dōgen. The bulk of the text, accounting for volumes one through seven, are "Dharma hall discourses" (jōdō; 上堂), which are highly formalized Dharma talks, given from 1236 to 1252. Volume eight consists of "informal meetings" (shōsan; 小參) that would have taken place in Dōgen's quarters with select groups of monks, as well as "Dharma words" (hōgo; 法語), which were letters containing practice instructions to specific students. Volume nine includes a collection of 90 traditional kōans with verse commentary by Dōgen, while volume 10 collects his Chinese poetry.

Unlike Dōgen's other major work the Shōbōgenzō, which was written in vernacular Late Middle Japanese, the text of Eihei Kōroku is written in the Japanese version of Classical Chinese, known as Kanbun. While Dōgen is also better known for the essays that make up the Shōbōgenzō, most of them were completed by 1244. After that date, nearly coinciding with his move from Kyoto to Eihei-ji, he wrote 405 of the 531 Dharma hall discourses that make up Eihei Kōroku, indicating that he may have come to prefer the jōdō format over the jishu style used in the Shōbōgenzō essays. Taigen Dan Leighton, a modern Zen priest and translator of the Eihei Kōroku, believes that the Dharma hall discourses tell us more about Dōgen the individual than the Shōbōgenzō as they reveal his training methodology, humor, and even emotional states.
