= Gudō Wafu Nishijima =

Japanese Buddhist priest (1919–2014)

- 西嶋愚道和夫
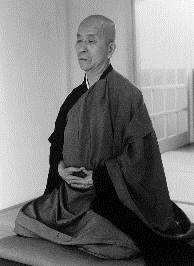
- Title: Rōshi

Personal life
- Born: November 29, 1919 Yokohama, Japan
- Died: January 28, 2014 (aged 94)
- Website: Dogen Sangha Blog

Religious life
- Religion: Zen Buddhism
- School: Sōtō

Senior posting
- Predecessor: Rempo Niwa Zenji

Gudō Wafu Nishijima (Japanese: 西嶋愚道和夫; 29 November 1919 – 28 January 2014) was a Japanese Zen Buddhist priest and teacher.

== Biography ==
As a young man in the early 1940s, Nishijima became a student of the Zen teacher Kōdō Sawaki. Shortly after the end of the Second World War, Nishijima received a law degree from Tokyo University and began a career in finance. It was not until 1973, when he was in his mid-fifties, that Nishijima was ordained as a Buddhist priest. His preceptor for this occasion was Rempo Niwa, a former head of the Soto Zen sect. Four years later, Niwa gave him shiho, formally accepting him as one of his successors. Nishijima continued his professional career until 1979.

During the 1960s, Nishijima began giving regular public lectures on Buddhism and zazen. From the 1980s, he lectured in English and had several foreign students. Nishijima was the author of several books in Japanese and English. He was also a notable translator of Buddhist texts: working with student and Dharma heir Mike Chodo Cross, Nishijima compiled one of three complete English versions of Dōgen's ninety-five-fascicle Kana Shōbōgenzō; he also translated Dōgen's Shinji Shōbōgenzō. He also published an English translation of Nagarjuna's Fundamental Verses of the Middle Way (Mūlamadhyamakakārikā).

In 2007, Nishijima and a group of his students organized as the Dogen Sangha International. In April 2012, the president of the organization, Brad Warner, dissolved it.

== Three philosophies and one reality ==
While studying the Shōbōgenzō, Nishijima developed a theory he called "three philosophies and one reality," which presents his distinctive interpretation of the Four Noble Truths as well as explaining the structure of Dōgen's writing. According to Nishijima, Dōgen carefully constructed the Shōbōgenzō according to a fourfold structure, in which he described each issue from four different perspectives. The first perspective is "idealist," "abstract," "spiritual," and "subjective"; Nishijima says this is the correct interpretation of the first Noble Truth (in mainstream Buddhism, the first Noble Truth is dukkha). The second perspective is "concrete", "materialistic", "scientific", and "objective" (in mainstream Buddhism, samudaya). The third perspective is described as an integration of the first two, producing a "realistic" synthesis (mainstream, nirodha). The fourth perspective is reality itself, which Nishijima argues cannot be contained in philosophy or stated in words, but which Dōgen attempts to suggest through poetry and symbolism. In mainstream Buddhism, the fourth Noble Truth is the Noble Eightfold Path.

Nishijima stated that "Buddhism is just Humanism" and he explains Dōgen's teaching on zazen in terms of balancing the autonomic nervous system.

== English-language books ==
- How to Practice Zazen (1976), with Joe Langdon
- Handbook of Authentic Buddhism, (1990s)
- To Meet the Real Dragon (1984), with Jeffrey Bailey
- Master Dogen's Shinji Shobogenzo (2003)
- A Heart to Heart Chat on Buddhism with Old Master Gudo (2015), with Jundo Cohen
- Master Dogen's Shobogenzo (2006), a complete translation published in four volumes, with Chodo Cross
- Fundamental Wisdom of the Middle Way: Nagarjuna's Mulamadhyamakakarika (2011), with Brad Warner
