= Kōshōhōrin-ji =

First independent zen temple in Japan

Kannondori Kōshōhōrin-ji 觀音導利興聖法林寺

Religion
- Affiliation: Sōtō Zen
- Status: Destroyed

Location
- Location: Fukakusa, Fushimi-ku, Kyoto
- Country: Japan

Architecture
- Founder: Dōgen Zenji
- Completed: 1236

Kōshōhōrin-ji (Japanese: 興聖法林寺), more commonly known by its abbreviated name Kōshō-ji (Japanese: 興聖寺) and sometimes by its full formal name Kannondori Kōshōhōrin-ji (Japanese: 觀音導利興聖法林寺), was the first independent zen temple in Japan. While Kennin-ji was established in 1202 and is usually considered the first zen temple in Japan, it was under the control of the powerful Tendai School based on Mount Hiei, resulting in the imposition of certain norms that were not present at Kōshō-ji. The short-lived temple was officially established in 1236 by Dōgen Zenji, the founder of the Sōtō school of zen in Japan. It was abandoned only seven years later in 1243 when Dōgen and his students left under poorly documented but possibly hostile circumstances to found Eihei-ji in modern-day Fukui Prefecture. A temple that exists today also uses the abbreviated name of Dōgen's temple, Kōshō-ji; it was established in 1649 in nearby Uji as an homage to Dōgen's original temple, but there is no direct continuity between the two.

The temple was founded on the site of an older temple called Gokuraku-ji (Japanese: 極楽寺), a common name for Buddhist temples associated with pure land devotion. In 1231 Dōgen first took up residence in a part of the temple complex called the Kannondori-in (Japanese: 觀音導利院), or the "Avalokiteśvara chapel", which would later become part of the temple's formal name. Initially functioning as a hermitage, Dōgen gradually attracted students until in the summer of 1232 enough were present to hold their first ango, an intensive three month practice period. Dōgen's primary disciple Koun Ejō arrived at the site in 1234 to become a student, and shortly thereafter began to record Dōgen's informal lectures that would later be compiled into the Shōbōgenzō Zuimonki. With the construction of Japan's first Chinese-style sōdō (Japanese: 僧堂), or monks' hall, in 1236, the temple officially changed its name to Kannondori Kōshōhōrin-ji. Due to the attention the monks' hall attracted many wealthy patrons began to support the temple, leading quickly to the construction of a hattō (Japanese: 法堂), or lecture hall. In 1241, Ekan of the Nihon Daruma-shu and his disciples became Dōgen's students at Kōshō-ji. Ekan's disciples included Tettsū Gikai, Gien, Giun, and Giin, all of whom would come to be important people in the early history of Sōtō Zen in Japan. Senne, who would later write commentaries on Dōgen's works, became Dōgen's student as Kōshō-ji and served as his attendant there. In 1243, one day after the end of Kōshō-ji's summer ango, Dōgen and his students abandoned the temple to move to Echizen Province. There is some evidence to suggest that Dōgen was forced to leave by the Tendai establishment due to perceived competition, but a lack of clear sources makes the precise reason for their departure impossible to pin down.
