= Tettsū Gikai =

Tettsū Gikai 徹通義介
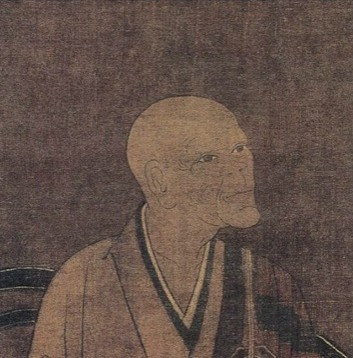
- Title: Zen Master

Personal life
- Born: 18 February 1219
- Died: 18 October 1309 (aged 90)

Religious life
- Religion: Buddhism
- School: Sōtō

Senior posting
- Teacher: Koun Ejō; Dōgen; Ekan
- Predecessor: Koun Ejō
- Successor: Keizan Jōkin
- Students: Keizan Jōkin

Tettsū Gikai (徹通義介) is the third spiritual leader of the Sōtō Zen school of Buddhism in Japan. He began his Buddhist life as a student of the Darumashū's Ekan, but later both became students of Eihei Dōgen's newly established Sōtō school. Gikai received dharma transmission from Koun Ejō, Dōgen's successor, and later became the third abbot of the school's head temple, Eihei-ji. Shortly thereafter, he became embroiled in a leadership crisis known as the sandai sōron. Other monks contended that other students, namely Jakuen, Gien or Giin, had stronger claims to the abbacy. The controversy remained unresolved at the time of his death. His abbacy was unpopular with some monks because he introduced innovative practices aimed at making Sōtō more palatable with the Japanese laity, which some claimed Dōgen would have frowned upon. However, he also had many followers, and eventually his innovations became the standard form of Sōtō Zen. His leadership marked the first geographical expansion of the Sōtō school when he moved with his followers to Kaga Province. Most notably, his disciple Keizan Jōkin became the second most famous figure in the school's history after Dōgen by generating mass appeal for Sōtō Zen and ultimately spreading the teachings to all corners of Japan.

== Early life ==
Tettsū Gikai was born in 1219 in a rural area of Echizen Province called Inazu. His family was part of the powerful Fujiwara clan, specifically claiming descent from the famous General Fujiwara no Toshihito. Members of this extended family included prominent monks of the region. Others had formed bonds through marriage with the Hatano family, which was to become the primary donor to the early Sōtō school. He became a monk at the age of twelve at a Darumashū temple called Hajaku-ji, which was located close to the future site of Sōtō Zen's main temple, Eihei-ji. His teacher was Ekan, a student of Kakuan, in turn a student of the Darumashū's founder Nōnin. His close connections to Echizen, and particularly its Buddhist elite, played a role in his importance to the early Sōtō school.

== Joining Dōgen's Sōtō School ==
Shortly after becoming a monk, Gikai relocated to Mt. Hiei for an unknown period of time for training, although he remained a student of Ekan. In 1241, most of the students of the Darumashū joined Eihei Dōgen's early Sōtō school, which at that time was centered at Kōshō-ji outside of Kyoto. Thus Ekan and Gikai both became students of Dōgen, although to an extent Gikai remained a student of Ekan simultaneously. In 1243, shortly after Dōgen and his followers had moved to Echizen where Eihei-ji would be built, Gikai was assigned to the important position of tenzo, or head cook. Dōgen considered tenzo to be suitable only for monks of high attainment, but on a more practical level Gikai was probably also better equipped to locate donors of food in his home province. About a decade later in 1251, Ekan gave dharma transmission of his Darumashū lineage to Gikai realizing that he would soon die without a successor. However, he also urged Ekan to receive transmission of the Sōtō lineage as well. Four years later in 1255, two years after Dōgen's death, Gikai accomplished this when he received dharma transmission from his former fellow Darumashū student and Dōgen's successor, Koun Ejō.

== Abbot of Eihei-ji and Departure ==
In 1267 Tettsū Gikai became abbot of Eihei-ji when Koun Ejō, the previous abbot, retired due to illness. Gikai's promotion to abbot was specifically requested by the two major patrons of the temple. Keizan Jōkin, who would go on to become an extremely important leader for the school, was ordained as a monk by Gikai in 1271 when Keizan was seven. The following year Gikai retired from his role as abbot, eventually being replaced by Gien, whose life and time at Eihei-ji is poorly documented. Gikai lived for the next 20 years caring for his mother near Eihei-ji and occasionally visiting the temple for various reasons. In 1280 he cared for his predecessor Ejō in the days before his death. During this time, Ejō apparently gave Gikai his robes, which he had in turn received from Dōgen. Nine days later Ejō died, after which Gikai performed the funeral. Gikai also held yearly services to commemorate Ejō's death, and it was during this period that a conflict arose between him and the followers of Ejō's other successor Jakuen. The reason for the dispute is not clear. Jakuen himself had left Eihei-ji many years before in 1261. Whatever the grounds, Gikai ultimately permanently departed from Eihei-ji in 1287 despite personal support from the temple's major patron.

== Abbot of Daijō-ji and Death ==
Gikai left Eihei-ji and traveled to the neighboring province of Kaga where he became the second abbot of Daijō-ji temple in 1293. The first abbot, Chōkai, was of the esoteric Shingon school and had probably known Gikai from his early years at Hajaku-ji, which was a Shingon temple that had hosted Darumashū students for several years. Furthermore, the temple was patronized by Togashi Iehisa of the Fujiwara clan, most likely a relative of Gikai. Several students from Eihei-ji joined Gikai at his new temple, including Keizan Jōkin, Meihō Sotetsu, and Gasan Jōseki. Two years after Gikai's arrival, he gave dharma transmission to Keizan. Three years later in 1298 Gikai passed on the position of abbot to Keizan as well, though he remained at the temple for the rest of his life. By 1306 Gikai's health began to decline. During this period he ordained all of the non-monk workers at the temple at his own insistence. He died in 1309. Keizan only served as abbot for two years after Gikai's death, after which the position was transferred to Meihō Sotetsu. Shortly after, the patrons of the temple replaced Meihō with a Rinzai monk for unknown reasons. Keizan wrote that this was a betrayal of Gikai, although Meihō would go on to be reinstated as the abbot of Daijō-ji after many years.

Buddhist titles
Preceded by Koun Ejō	Sōtō Zen patriarch 1280–1309	Succeeded by Keizan Jōkin
