= Daiji-ji (Kumamoto) =

Buddhist temple in Minami-ku, Kumamoto, Japan

Daiji-ji 大慈寺
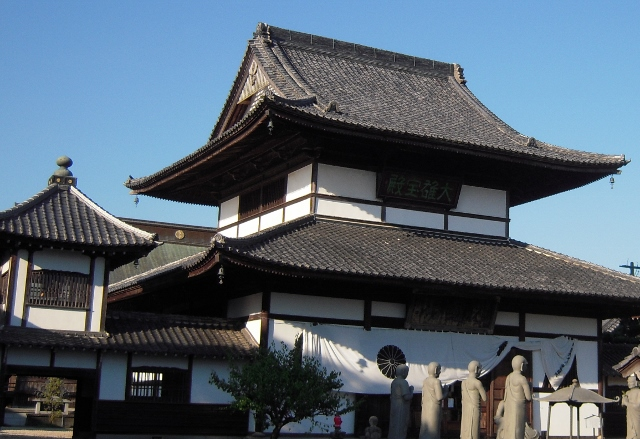
- Main Hall

Religion
- Affiliation: Sōtō

Location
- Location: 1-7-1, Noda, Minami-ku, Kumamoto; Kumamoto Prefecture 861-4114
- Country: Japan
- Interactive map of Daiji-ji 大慈寺
- Coordinates: 32°43′59.8″N 130°41′21.6″E

Architecture
- Founder: Kangan Giin
- Completed: 1278

Daiji-ji (大慈寺), also known as Daijizen-ji (大慈禅寺), is a Sōtō Zen Buddhist temple in Minami-ku, Kumamoto, Japan. Its honorary sangō prefix is Dairyōzan (大梁山).

== History ==
The temple was founded in 1278 by Kangan Giin with support of Kawashiri Yasuaki (川尻泰明), the local chief. Kangan Giin, a disciple of Dōgen and the founder of the Higo school of Sōtō Zen Buddhism. It has long been known as the leading Sōtō Zen temple in Kyushu. The local scenery resembles that of Dàbēi shān (大慈山) in Mingzhou now Ningbo, China, where Giin practiced Zen Buddhism discipline.

This temple has since been destroyed twice in the fire caused by war, and nothing of Giin's remains remain there. The current buildings are the Edo-period Hondō dating to 1779.

== Important Cultural Properties ==
The bronze bell, a 169 centimeter tall inside the main gate was built in 1269.
