= Koun Ejō =

Koun Ejō 孤雲懐奘
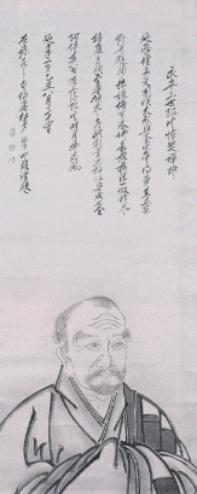
- Title: Zen Master

Personal life
- Born: 1198
- Died: 1280 (aged 81–82)

Religious life
- Religion: Buddhism
- School: Sōtō

Senior posting
- Teacher: Dōgen
- Predecessor: Dōgen
- Successor: Tettsū Gikai
- Students: Jakuen Tettsū Gikai Gien Kangan Giin

Koun Ejō (孤雲懐奘) (1198–1280) was the second patriarch of the Japanese Sōtō school of Zen Buddhism who lived during the Kamakura period. He was initially a disciple of the short-lived Darumashū sect of Japanese Zen founded by Nōnin, but later studied and received dharma transmission under the Sōtō schools founder Dōgen. Today Ejō is considered Dōgen's spiritual successor by all existing branches of the Sōtō school. He is remembered today primarily as the author of the Shōbōgenzō Zuimonki, a collection of informal talks by Dōgen which Ejō recorded throughout his discipleship. He is also featured prominently in the Denkōroku, the first major piece of scripture produced in the Sōtō school after Dōgen, with his transmission story serving as the final koan. After Dōgen's death, Ejō struggled to maintain leadership of the new Eihei-ji monastery, due in part to his lack of training in China that prevented him from completing the temple as a Chinese-style meditation hall, as well as unfamiliarity with Chinese-style monastic practices. He gave dharma transmission to Jakuen, Gikai, Gien and Giin, all of whom were originally students of Dōgen, but his failure to designate a clear heir himself led to a power struggle known as the sandai sōron that temporarily split the community.

== Biography ==
=== Early life ===
Koun Ejō was born into the powerful Fujiwara clan in 1198 to an aristocratic family. His early education took place in Kyoto, after which he went to Mount Hiei to study Buddhism in the Tendai school while still young. In 1215, he was ordained as a monk and in 1218, he took the Bodhisattva vows at Enryaku-ji under his teacher Ennō. He would have studied Tendai and Shingon extensively, but dissatisfaction with these led him to examine Pure Land Buddhism. In 1219 he left Mount Hiei to study in the Jōdo school under Zennebō Shōku, a disciple of Hōnen, at Ōjō-in (now called Giō-ji). Apparently dissatisfied with the school, he left in 1222 or 1223 to study in the Daruma school, which had been founded by Dainichibō Nōnin about a decade before Koun Ejō's birth. His teacher, Kakuan, a disciple of Nōnin, had his community of monks in Tōnomine, outside Nara, apparently after having fled from Mount Hiei, where they had been persecuted by members of the Tendai school. Ejō is reported to have been a prominent student under Kakuan, but his time there was cut short in 1228 when representatives of the Tendai temple Kōfuku-ji in Nara burned down the buildings in the Daruma school temple complex, seemingly in response the perceived threat posed by its new teachings; the students were thus forced to disperse.

=== First encounters with Dōgen ===
After the destruction of Kakuan's group in Tōnomine, Koun Ejō returned to Kyoto. It was during this visit in 1228 that Ejō met Dōgen at Kennin-ji, where he had been studying under Eisai after his return from China. Ejō may have been prompted to visit following the impact of Dōgen's first work, Fukanzazengi. According to the Denkōroku, the two men discussed their respective experiences with Zen at length. While they initially agreed on their shared insights, at some point the two began to disagree. Ultimately, Ejō felt convinced that Dōgen's accounts of his experiences were superior to his own. He thus asked Dōgen to become his teacher, but Dōgen declined citing a lack of practice space. Other accounts claim that Ejō was not convinced by Dōgen's philosophy at this first meeting and he instead left their encounter in frustration. According to these accounts, it was only after a later meeting that Ejō requested to become a student. Ejō probably returned to Tōnomine to live with his master Kakuan after this episode in Kyoto. However, Kakuan soon became sick and died sometime around 1234. Following his master's death, Ejō left for Kannon-dōri-in (later changed to Kōshōhōrin-ji), Dōgen's newly established temple in Uji, where he would finally become his student.

=== Ordination at Kōshōhōrin-ji ===
After about a year living at Dōgen's new temple, Ejō was accepted as a student and ordained into the lineage on 15 August 1235. Shortly after this event, Ejō took part in the planning of the sōdō (僧堂; meditation hall) which was to be built there, and also oversaw its dedication in October 1236. According to hagiography, it was around this time that Ejō had an enlightenment experience. Dōgen was reading a kōan to his students in which a monk asks Shishuang Chuyuan, "How is it that one hair digs many ditches"?, reportedly triggering his experience. This is thought to have taken place in November 1236. According to Dairyō Gumon, writing much later in the 17th century, Ejō received dharma transmission from Dōgen just after this event, complete with the presentation of certification documents. The following month, Ejō was made shuso (首座; head monk). Following these events, regardless of the veracity of Gumon's claims, contemporary historical sources such as the Denkōroku agree that Ejō was treated as Dōgen's heir, serving as his closest attendant. The Denkōroku states: "Throughout the day, he was inseparable from the master, like a trailing shadow".

During his first few years at Kōshōhōrin-ji, he began to record Dōgen's teachings in what became known as the Shōbōgenzō zuimonki. He wrote the work in every-day Japanese rather than Chinese, the intellectual language of the time. To this day, it is considered one of the more easily understood of Dōgen's work, although the topics included seem to be a reflection of Ejō's interests. His mother also became ill during this period and died soon thereafter. Ejō apparently visited her during her illness during an allotted six-day vacation period following the winter sesshin, but shortly after he returned, he was informed his mother's condition had worsened and she would likely soon expire. However, because he had already used his allowed free time, he decided not to return to her side, instead choosing to strictly observe monastic regulations.

=== Transition to Echizen ===
In the summer of 1243, Ejō left Kōshōhōrin-ji for Echizen with Dōgen and his other students after Hatano Yoshishige, a magistrate from that area, offered land and protection for a new monastery. Dōgen and his followers accepted the offer largely because of continuous tensions with the Tendai community in Kyoto which threatened the long-term stability of their practice. Before the construction of the new temple had been completed, the monks stayed at the temples Kippō-ji and Yamashibu. During this time, Ejō served Dōgen as before, continued a project managing the texts for what would become Dōgen's magnum opus, the Shōbōgenzō (not to be confused with the Shōbōgenzō zuimonki mentioned above), and also assisting in the planning of the new temple being constructed. In the summer of 1244 the hattō (法堂; dharma hall) of the new temple, originally called Daibutsu-ji, was completed. In June 1246, the temple name was changed to what it is still known as to this day: Eihei-ji. For these first years at the new temple, Ejō found himself taking on many of the responsibilities for the day-to-day functioning of the new temple. He simultaneously began work on Eihei kōroku (Broad Record of Eihei) and Eihei shingi (Pure Criteria of Eihei) with the help of the other students Gien and Sene.

=== Dōgen's death and Ejō as second abbot of Eihei-ji ===
Ejō accompanied Dōgen to Kamakura, then the capital of Japan, during a six-month visit starting in 1247 on which he taught Hōjō Tokiyori, the shōgun's regent. They returned in 1248, during which time Ejō continued his recordings of Dōgen's sermons, which increased in frequency during these years. By the fall of 1252, Dōgen had become sick. In expectation of his approaching death, in the summer of 1253 he passed Ejō's responsibilities on to Tettsū Gikai and installed Ejō as the second abbot of Eihei-ji. Dōgen left for Kyoto to seek medical assistance, but died a few days after his arrival there on 28 August, leaving Ejō as the sole leader of Eihei-ji. Ejō's first act was to have a pagoda built in Dōgen's honour.

Ejō's tenure as abbot attempted to keep things at Eihei-ji as they were. Unfortunately, he was not gifted with Dōgen's keen leadership abilities, and he had the most trouble with his former fellow students of the Darumashū, who saw him as an equal and not an authority figure. Problems also arose with the question of a successor. Dōgen had clearly considered Tettsū Gikai a preeminent disciple, which Ejō well knew. However, he disliked Gikai's desire to reintroduce aspects of Darumashū practice that Dōgen had rejected, and Dōgen himself had commented on his lack of compassion in his interactions with other monks. Nonetheless, Ejō formally made Gikai his heir in January 1256 after making him agree to uphold Dōgen's teachings above all else. After this, Ejō sent Gikai on a pilgrimage of Zen temples in Japan, which Gikai voluntarily extended to include a visit to China, whence he returned in 1262.

=== Start of sandai sōron and death ===
Gikai's return marked the beginning of what is known as the sandai sōron, a schism that would split Dōgen's community into multiple competing factions. Because Gikai had an interest in architecture and had recorded temple constructions during his time in China, Ejō allowed him to take control of the ongoing building projects at Eihei-ji. In 1267, Ejō had become ill and decided to retire as abbot. He moved out of Eihei-ji to a nearby location, but continued to be considered the tōdōi, a rank for retired abbots. Two monks, Bussō and Dōson, are even said to have attained enlightenment under him during his stay outside the temple. At any rate, his health had improved within a short time of leaving Eihei-ji.

Meanwhile, Gikai was deeply unpopular at Eihei-ji. Despite his assurances to Ejō to the contrary, he attempted to reform the practices at Eihei-ji, which were generally seen by the monks as an affront to Dōgen's teachings. He focused on building projects and expansion of the physical aspects of the school while apparently ignoring Dōgen's preference for poverty. Especially unpopular was his attempt to introduce rituals from the Shingon school which Dōgen had expressly condemned. Rather than face a popular uprising, he decided to step down as abbot and Ejō was asked to return in that capacity in 1272. Ejō worked to reconcile the competing factions in the community. By 1280 he had become ill again and began to prepare for his death. He requested that no pagoda be built for him, but rather that he be buried next to Dōgen's pagoda. After he died, confusion surrounded who should next lead the community, culminating in the climax of the sandai sōron, with several of Dōgen's students, especially Gikai and Gien, claiming the right to the abbotship.

Buddhist titles
Preceded by Dōgen	Sōtō Zen patriarch 1253–1280	Succeeded by Tettsu Gikai
