= Kangan Giin =

Japanese Zen master

Kangan Giin 寒巌義尹
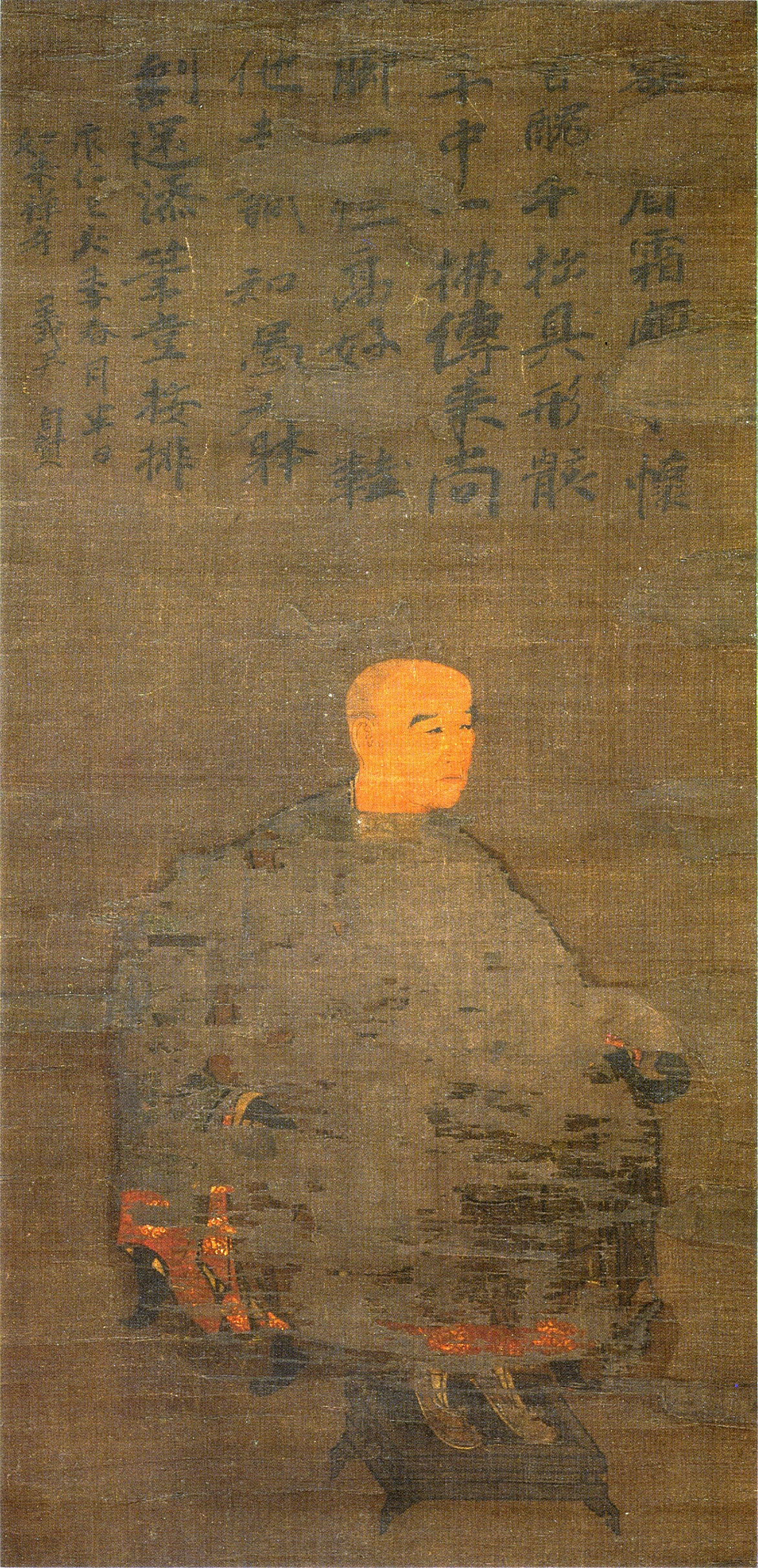
- Title: Zen Master

Personal life
- Born: 1217
- Died: 1300 (aged 82–83)

Religious life
- Religion: Buddhism
- School: Sōtō

Senior posting
- Teacher: Kakuzen Ekan; Dōgen; Koun Ejō
- Predecessor: Koun Ejō
- Successor: Shidō Shōyū
- Students: Shidō Shōyū Tetsuzan Gukoku Ninnō Daichi Sokei

Kangan Giin (寒巌義尹, 1217–1300) was a disciple of Dōgen and the founder of the Higo school of Sōtō Zen Buddhism. It has been claimed that his father was Emperor Go-Toba or Emperor Juntoku. He did much evangelization work in Kyūshū, where he founded Daiji-ji (大慈寺) in Kumamoto. Before practicing with Dōgen, Giin started his Buddhist path as a Tendai monk. He later abandoned that school and became a member of Daruma School under Kakuzen Ekan. Along with his fellow students Tettsū Gikai and Gien, Giin became a student of Dōgen when Giin's teacher Ekan himself became a student of Dōgen. Dōgen died without giving dharma transmission to Giin, but he received it later from Dōgen's primary disciple, Koun Ejō.

Giin traveled to China after Dōgen's death in order to present Dōgen's recorded sayings, the Eihei Kōroku, to Chinese monks in the Caodong lineage of Tiantong Rujing, Dōgen's teacher. Giin asked Wuwai Yiyuan, a primary student of Rujing, to write a foreword for the collection as well as to edit it. The text became the Eihei Dōgen Zenji Goroku, an edited selection from Eihei Kōroku. After returning from China, Giin practiced at a temple called Shōfuku-ji in Kyushu connected to Myōan Eisai. Shortly thereafter, records tell us that Giin formed a relationship with a powerful samurai named Kawajiri Yasuaki who in 1269 sponsored the construction of Giin's first temple, Nyorai-ji. In 1282 Yasuaki paid for the construction of a second temple, Daiji-ji, with which Giin is now usually associated with.

== See also ==
- Daiji-ji
- Gikai
- Jakuen
- Sandai sōron
