= Sandai sōron =

The sandai sōron (三代相論), or third-generation differentiation, was a putative dispute over the orthodoxy and succession of Sōtō Zen Buddhism. The major figures involved were Jakuen, Gikai, Gien, and Giin, all of whom claimed the right to serve as abbot of Eihei-ji. The story of the sandai sōron does not appear until 150 years after it supposedly occurred, suggesting its authenticity is dubious. It seems to have been used as a just-so story to explain how Jakuen's line eventually wound up in control of Eihei-ji. The obscure term sōron (相論, a translation of the Sanskrit laksana) may have been a euphemism for a third-generation schism.

== Historical context ==
Sōtō's founder Dōgen named Koun Ejō as his successor, but Ejō did not name a definite successor. The four monks who received dharma transmission from Ejō all made claims of friendship with Dōgen and Ejō, with various levels of honesty, and adherence to the principles of Sōtō, which were interpreted in varying ways.

It is clear that Jakuen voluntarily left Eihei-ji by himself. His monks at first remained behind, possibly contributing to the fragmentation of Jakuen's line.

Kangan Giin and Gikai also left Eihei-ji under unclear circumstances, but with more followers than Jakuen or Gien. Gikai's successor Keizan became the most famous figure of Sōtō after Dōgen, and by the early modern era, Keizan's version of Sōtō had become the only one practiced in Japan.

Gien (義演) was eventually decided to be the rightful third abbot of Eihei-ji, but he failed to make any other impact on history. In fact, by the time monastic histories were compiled, nobody remembered anything about Gien other than his role in the power struggle. The power of Eihei-ji quickly dwindled, eventually being taken over by Jakuen's disciple Giun. The Jakuen line continued to control Eihei-ji until 1468.

== Jakuen school account ==
Kenkō, a monk from Jakuen's line, wrote a history of Sōtō in the 15th century, in which he claimed that Jakuen was posthumously made Eihei-ji's third abbot due to the "sandai sōron". His disciple Kenzei elaborated on the claim, saying that after the death of Ejō, Gien occupied the abbacy by fiat while Gikai was in the city of Kamakura. When Gikai returned Gien had died, but he disputed the title with Gien's supporters. Unable to resolve it, the monks took the issue to the local shōgun, who ruled both Gikai and Gien "former abbot"—making Jakuen, the next in line, the true abbot although he had already left Eihei-ji.

== Rinzai sect accounts ==
The Rinzai monk Taikyokyu, also writing in the 15th century, gave an alternate account. According to his source, when Gikai returned from Kamakura, Gien and Ejō were both alive and Gien offered him the abbacy, but Gikai refused because Gien was below him in rank. Ejō then served a second abbacy to allow Gikai to receive it from a higher ranking monk, but Gikai continued to dispute that Gien ever rightfully held the title of abbot. This account concludes by saying that Gikai left Eihei-ji voluntarily because he had enough supporters to strike out on his own.

Two other contemporary Rinzai monks related that Gikai and Gien disputed which of them was senior monk, Gikai saying that he had studied longer, and Gien saying that he was older.

== Giin school account ==
The final primary source comes from the Giin school and is dated a century later. This source claims that Giin voluntarily relinquished his (historically absurd) rightful claim to the abbacy, and that Ejō designated Gikai as his disciple, but that Gien challenged this investiture, claiming that he should come first because Dōgen gave him direct dharma transmission. It incorrectly says that the monks drew lots and chose Jakuen.
