= Shōbōgenzō Zuimonki =

Collection of informal Dharma talks

Shōbōgenzō Zuimonki (Japanese: 正法眼蔵隨聞記), sometimes known by its English translation The Treasury of the True Dharma Eye: Record of Things Heard, is a collection of informal Dharma talks given by the 13th century Sōtō Zen monk Eihei Dōgen and recorded by his primary disciple Koun Ejō from 1236 to 1239. The text was likely further edited by other disciples after Ejō's death.

The work is generally considered to be the easiest to understand of Dōgen's due to its concrete examples and the infrequent use of allusion, metaphor, and word play characteristic of his other writings. According to Shōhaku Okumura, a modern Zen priest, the fundamental message in Dōgen's talks is the importance of seeing impermanence. Dōgen also stresses the importance of monastic practice with a group of practitioners, practicing for the sake of the Buddhadharma alone, gainless zazen, intentional poverty, and taking steps to benefit others.

Several different versions of the Shōbōgenzō Zuimonki exist. The most widely read was first published in 1770 by Menzan Zuihō, a highly influential Zen scholar monk. This text is known as the rufu-bon, which means "popular version". A second, older version is called the Chōenji-bon, or "Chōen-ji version" after the temple in Aichi Prefecture where it was discovered in 1942 by Dōshū Ōkubo. This version was not available to the public until it was published by Chikuma Shobō with a modern Japanese translation in 1963.

== English translations ==
Reiho Masunaga produced an English translation in 1975.

Uchiyama, Kosho (2018), Deepest Practice, Deepest Wisdom: Three Fascicles from Shobogenzo with Commentary, translated by Okumura, Shōhaku; Wright, Daitsu Tom, Somerville, MA: Wisdom Publications, ISBN 978-1614293026

Eihei Dogen, Shohaku Okumura trans. (2022), Dōgen's Shōbōgenzo Zuimonki: The New Annotated Translation―Also Including Dogen's Waka Poetry with Commentary, Somerville, MA: Wisdom Publications, ISBN 978-1614295730
