= Sōtō =

School of Zen in Japanese Buddhism

Sōtō Zen or the Sōtō school (曹洞宗, Sōtō-shū) is the largest of the three traditional sects of Zen in Japanese Buddhism (the others being Rinzai and Ōbaku). It is the Japanese line of the Chinese Caodong school, which was founded during the Tang dynasty by Dongshan Liangjie. It emphasizes Shikantaza, meditation with no objects, anchors, or content. The meditator strives to be aware of the stream of thoughts, allowing them to arise and pass away without interference.

The Japanese brand of the sect was imported in the 13th century by Dōgen Zenji, who studied Caodong Buddhism (Chinese: 曹洞宗; pinyin: Cáodòng Zōng) abroad in China. Dōgen is remembered today as the ancestor of Sōtō Zen in Japan along with Keizan Jōkin.

With about 14,000 temples, Sōtō is one of the largest Japanese Buddhist organizations. (Note: But it is not the largest network as a school. About 30,000 temples in Japanese Pure Land Buddhism are split across over 10 legal entities.) Sōtō Zen is now also popular in the West, and in 1996 priests of the Sōtō Zen tradition formed the Soto Zen Buddhist Association based in North America.

== History ==
=== Chinese origins ===
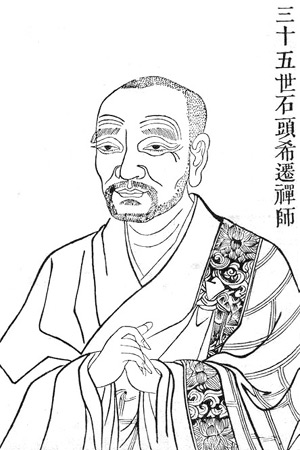
Shitou Xiqian

The original Chinese version of Sōtō-shū, i.e. the Caodong-school (曹洞宗) was established by the Tang dynasty monk Dongshan Liangjie (洞山良价 Ja: Tōzan Ryōkai) in the ninth century.

One prevalent view is that the sect's name was originally formed by taking one character each from the names of Dongshan and his disciple Caoshan Benji (曹山本寂, Sōzan Honjaku), and was originally called Dongcao sect (with the characters in transposed order). However, to paraphrase the Dongshan Yulu (《洞山語録》, "Record of the Dialogues of Dongshan"), the sect's name denotes 'colleagues (曹) of the teachings above the caves (洞)' who together follow the "black wind (teachings of Taoism?)" and admire the masters of various sects. (Note: 「洞上の玄風、天下にしく、故に諸方の宗匠、ともにこれを推尊して洞曹宗という」. (Japanese tr. by Masunaga))

Perhaps more significantly for the Japanese brand of this sect, Dōgen among others advocated the reinterpretation that the "Cao" represents not Caoshan, but rather "Huineng of Caoxi temple" Sōkei Enō (曹渓慧能); Ch. 曹溪慧能). The branch that was founded by Caoshan died off, and Dōgen was a student of the other branch that survived in China.

A precursor to the sect is Shitou Xiqian (Ch. 石頭希遷, c. 700 – c. 790), the attributed author of the poem Sandokai, which formed the basis of Song of the Precious Mirror Samadhi of Dongshan Liangjie (Jp. Tōzan Ryōkai) and the teaching of the Five Ranks.

=== Kamakura (1185–1333) ===
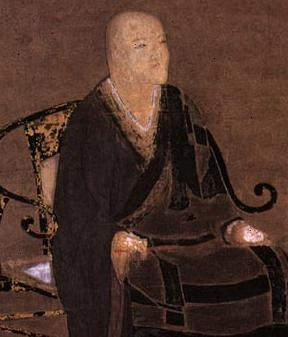
Dōgen Zenji, credited as a founder of the Sōtō sect in Japan

Starting with Dōgen, a partial lineage chart is as follows:

Soto-Shu Lineage Chart

Ejō, 2nd head of Eiheiji (懐奘, 1198–1280)
Gien, 4th head of Eiheiji (義演, dates unknown)
Gasan Jōseki; 2nd head of Sojiji Temple (峨山韶碩, 1276–1366)
Sōjiji Temple

Dōgen, Founder of Soto Zen in Japan; Founder of Eiheiji Temple (道元, 1200–1253)
Gikai, 3rd head of Eiheiji; Founder of Daijoji Temple (義介, 1219–1309)
Keizan "Second founder" of Soto Zen; 2nd head of Daijōji Temple; Founder of Sojiji Temple (瑩山, 1264–1325)
Meihō Sotetsu; 3rd head of Daijōji Temple (明峰素哲, 1277–1350)
Daijōji Temple

Senne (詮慧, 13th c.)
Jakuen (寂円, 1207–1299)
Giun, 5th head of Eiheiji (義雲, 1253–1333)
Eiheiji Temple

==== Dōgen ====
The Caodong-teachings were brought to Japan in 1227, when Dōgen returned to Japan after studying Ch'an in China and settled at Kennin-ji in Kyoto. Dōgen had received Dharma transmission from Tiantong Rujing at Qìngdé Temple, where Hongzhi Zhengjue once was abbot. Hongzhi's writings on "silent illumination" had greatly influenced Dōgen's own conception of shikantaza.

Dōgen did return from China with various kōan anthologies and other texts, contributing to the transmission of the koan tradition to Japan. In the first works he wrote he emphasised the practice of zazen, which brought him into trouble at Kennin-ji:

This assertion of the primacy of Zen aroused the anger of the Enryaku-ji monks, who succeeded in driving Dōgen from the Kennin-ji where he had settled after his return to the capital.

In 1243 Dōgen founded Eihei-ji, one of the two head temples of Sōtō-shū today, choosing...

... to create new monastic institutions based on the Chinese model and risk incurring the open hostility and opposition of the established schools.

Daily routine was copied from Chinese practices, which went back to the Indian tradition:

The elements of Sōtō practice that contributed most to the success of the school in medieval Japan were precisely the generic Buddhist monastic practices inherited from Sung China, and ultimately from India. The Sōtō Zen style of group meditation on long platforms in a sangha hall, where the monks also took meals and slept at night, was the same as that prescribed in Indian Vinaya texts. The etiquette followed in Sōtō monasteries can also be traced back to the Indian Vinaya.

==== Ejō ====
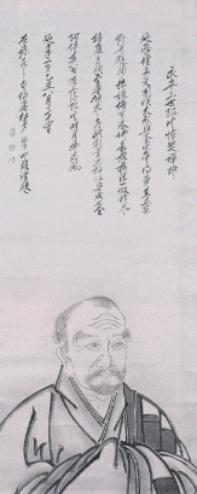
Koun Ejō

Dōgen was succeeded around 1236 by his disciple Koun Ejō (1198–1280), who originally was a member of the Daruma school of Nōnin, but joined Dōgen in 1229. Ejō started his Buddhist studies at Mount Hiei, the center of Tendai studies. Following his stay there he studied Pure Land Buddhism under Shōkū, whereafter he joined the Daruma school of Nōnin by then led by Kakuan., and later Dōgen's community in 1234.

Ejō composed a journal in colloquial Japanese called the Shōbōgenzō Zuimonki (正法眼蔵随聞記, "The Treasury of the True Dharma Eye: Record of Things Heard"), or simply Zuimonki for short, recollecting conversations he had with Dōgen. The recorded conversations emphasize the primacy of an austere Zen Buddhism, and resisted efforts from outside to incorporate other practices such as building Buddhist statues, or erecting new temples, and contrast with a different journal, the Goyuigon Kiroku (御遺言記録, "Record of Final Words [of the founder of Eiheiji]"), an apocryphal journal attributed to Gikai.

==== Gikai ====
A large group from the Daruma-school under the leadership of Ekan joined the Dogen-school in 1241, after severe conflicts with the Tendai and Rinzai schools. Among this group were Gikai, Gien and Giin, who were to become influential members of Dōgen's school.

After the death of Ejō, a controversy called the sandai sōron occurred. In 1267 Ejō retired as Abbot of Eihei-ji, giving way to Gikai, who was already favored by Dogen. Gikai too originally was a member of the Daruma school, but joined Dōgen's school in 1241, together with a group from the Nōnin school led by Ekan. Gikai introduced esoteric elements into the practice:

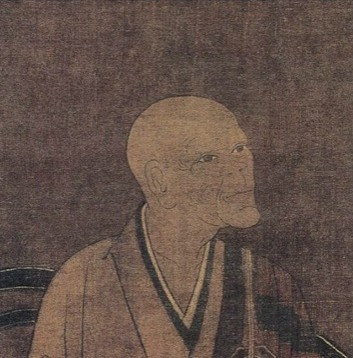
Tettsū Gikai

[W]ith the premature death of Dōgen the group lost its focus and internal conflicts led to a split. Dōgen's followers soon introduced such esoteric elements as prayers and incantations into the teaching.

Opposition arose, and in 1272 Ejō resumed the position of abbot. After his death in 1280, Gikai became abbot again, strengthened by the support of the military for magical practices. Opposition arose again, and Gikai was forced to leave Eihei-ji, and exiled to Kaga Province, Daijō-ji (in Ishikawa Prefecture). He was succeeded by Gien, who was first trained in the Daruma-school of Nōnin. His supporters designated him as the third abbot, rejecting the legitimacy of Gikai.

==== Keizan ====
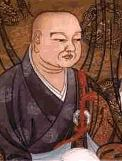
Keizan

The second most important figure in Sōtō, Keizan, belonged to this dissident branch. Keizan received ordination from Ejō when he was, twelve years old, shortly before Ejō's death When he was seventeen he went on a pilgrimage for three years throughout Japan. During this period, he studied Rinzai, Shingon and Tendai. After returning to Daijō-ji, Keizan received dharma transmission from Gikai in 1294, and established Joman-ji. In 1303 Gikai appointed Keizan as abbot of Daijō-ji, a position he maintained until 1311.

Keizan enlarged the Shingon-temple Yōkō-ji in Ishikawa prefecture, turning it into a Zen monastery in 1312. Thereafter he inherited the Shingon temple Shogaku-ji in 1322, renaming it Sōji-ji, which was recognized as an official monastery. In 1324 he put Gasan Jōseki in charge of Sojo-ji, and returned to Yōkō-ji. Yōko-ji was Keizan's main temple, but Sōji-ji thrived better, thanks to Gasan Jōseki

Though today Dōgen is referred as the founder of Sōtō, for a long period Sōtō history recognized several important ancestors, next to Dōgen. In 1877 the heads of the Sōtō community acknowledged Keizan for a brief period as the overall founder of the Sōtō sect.

Dogen is known as the "koso", where Keizan is known as the "taiso";

Both terms mean the original ancestor, that is, the founder of Japanese Sōtō Zen tradition.

==== Sōtō centers ====
At the end of the Kamakura period, Dōgen's school centered around four centers, namely Eihei-ji, Daijo-ji monastery, and the temples Yoko-ji and Sōji-ji. Sōji-ji became the most influential center of the Dōgen school.

=== Muromachi (or Ashikaga) (1336–1573) ===
During the Muromachi period the Rinzai school was the most successful of the schools, since it was favoured by the shōgun. But Soto too spread out over Japan.

==== Gasan and Sotetsu ====
Gasan Jōseki (1275–1365) and Meiho Sotetsu were Keizan's most prominent students.

Gasan too started his Buddhist studies at mount Hiei. He became head of Soji-ji in 1324. Gasan adopted the Five Ranks of Tung-shan as a fit vehicle to explain the Mahayana teachings.

Sotetsu became head of Yoko-ji in 1325. Initially his influence soon grew. In 1337 Sotetsu was appointed as abbot of Daijo-ji.

=== Azuchi-Momoyama (1573–1600) and Edo (or Tokugawa) (1600–1868) ===
After a period of war Japan was re-united in the Azuchi–Momoyama period. Neo-Confucianism gained influence at the expense of Buddhism, which came under strict state control. The power of Buddhism decreased during the Tokugawa period. Buddhism had become a strong political and military force in Japan and was seen as a threat by the ruling clan. Measures were taken to control the Buddhist organisations, and to limit their power and influence. The temple hierarchy system was centralized and unified.

Japan closed the gates to the rest of the world. New doctrines and methods were not to be introduced, nor were new temples and schools. The only exception was the Ōbaku lineage, which was introduced in the 17th century during the Edo period by Ingen, a Chinese monk. The presence of these Chinese monks also influenced the existing Zen-schools, spreading new ideas about monastic discipline and the rules for dharma transmission.

The Sōtō school started to place a growing emphasis on textual authority. In 1615 the bakufu declared that "Eheiji's standards (kakun) must be the rule for all Sōtō monks". In time this came to mean all the writings of Dōgen, which thereby became the normative source for the doctrines and organisation of the Sōtō school.

A key factor in this growing emphasis on Dogen was Manzan's appeal to change the rules for dharma transmission, based on arguments derived from the Shōbōgenzō. From its beginnings, Sōtō-shū has laid a strong emphasis on the right lineage and dharma transmission. In time, dharma transmission became synonymous with the transmission of temple ownership. When an abbot changed position, becoming abbot of another temple, he also had to discard his lineage and adopt the lineage of his new temple. This was changed by Manzan Dokahu (1636–1714), a Sōtō reformer, who:

[P]ropagated the view that Dharma transmission was dependent on personal initiation between a Master and disciple rather than on the disciple's enlightenment. He maintained this view in the face of strong opposition, citing as authority the towering figure of Japanese Zen, Dōgen ... This became and continues to this day to be the official Sōtō Zen view.

Dōgen scholarship came to a central position in the Sōtō sect with the writings of Menzan Zuihō (1683–1769), who wrote over a hundred works, including many commentaries on Dōgen's major texts and analysis of his doctrines. Menzan promoted reforms of monastic regulations and practice, based on his reading of Dōgen.

Another reformation was implemented by Gentō Sokuchū (1729–1807), the 11th abbot of Eihei-ji, who tried to purify the Sōtō school, de-emphasizing the use of kōans. In the Middle Ages kōan study was widely practiced in the Sōtō school. Gentō Sokuchū started the elevation of Dōgen to the status he has nowadays, when he implemented new regulations, based on Dōgen's regulations.

This growing status of Dōgen as textual authority also posed a problem for the Sōtō school:

The Sōtō hierarchy, no doubt afraid of what other radical reformers might find in Dōgen's Shobo Genzo, a work open to a variety of interpretations, immediately took steps to restrict access to this traditional symbol of sectarian authority. Acting at the request of the Sōtō prelates, in 1722 the government prohibited the copying or publication of any part of Shobo Genzo.

=== Meiji Restoration (1868–1912) and Imperial expansionism ===
Sōji-Temple, Tsurumi-ku, Yokohama

During the Meiji period (1868–1912) Japan abandoned its feudal system and opened up to Western modernism. Shinto became the state religion, and Buddhism was coerced to adapt to the new regime. Rinzai and Sōtō Zen chose to adapt, with embarrassing consequences when Japanese nationalism was endorsed by the Zen institutions. War endeavours against Russia, China and finally during the Pacific War were supported by the Zen establishment.

Within the Buddhist establishment the Western world was seen as a threat, but also as a challenge to stand up to. Parties within the Zen establishment sought to modernize Zen in accord with Western insights, while simultaneously maintaining a Japanese identity.

During this period a reappraisal of Dōgen started. The memory of Dōgen was used to ensure Eihei-ji's central place in the Sōtō organisation, and "to cement closer ties with lay people". In 1899 the first lay ordination ceremony was organized in Eihei-ji. Eihei-ji also promoted the study of Dōgen's works, especially the Shōbōgenzō, which changed the view of Dōgen in Sōtō's history. An image of Dōgen was created that suited the specific interests of Eihei-ji:

Dōgen's memory has helped keep Eihei-ji financially secure, in good repair, and filled with monks and lay pilgrims who look to Dōgen for religious inspiration ... the Dōgen we remember is a constructed image, an image constructed in large measure to serve the sectarian agendas of Eihei-ji in its rivalry with Sōji-ji. We should remember that the Dōgen of the Shōbōgenzō, the Dōgen who is held up as a profound religious philosopher, is a fairly recent innovation in the history of Dōgen remembrances.

=== Lay interests ===
Funerals continue to play an important role as a point of contact between the monks and the laity. Statistics published by the Sōtō school state that 80 percent of Sōtō laymen visit their temple only for reasons having to do with funerals and death, while only 17 percent visit for spiritual reasons and a mere 3 percent visit a Zen priest at a time of personal trouble or crisis.

=== Monastic training ===
In a piece of advice to western practitioners, Kojun Kishigami Osho, a dharma heir of Kōdō Sawaki, writes:

Every year, about 150 novices arrive. About 90 percent of them are sons of temple heads, which leaves only 10 percent who chose this path for themselves. For the autumn session, about 250 monks come together. Essentially what they are learning in these temples is the ability to officiate all kinds of ceremonies and rites practiced by the Sōtō School – the methods for fulfilling their role. Apart from this aspect, practicing with the idea of developing one’s own spirituality is not prevalent.

According to Kishigami, practice may as well be undertaken elsewhere:

If you want to study Buddhism, I recommend the Japanese universities. If you want to learn the ceremonies practiced by the Sōtō School, you need only head for Eihei-ji or Soji-ji.
But if your goal is to seriously learn the practice of zazen, unfortunately, I have no Japanese temple to recommend to you. Of course, you can go to Antai-ji, if you want; but if you want to deepen your practice of true Zen, you can do it in Europe. If you go to Japan for this, you will be disappointed. Don't expect to find anything wonderful there.

== Spread in the western world ==
In the 20th century Sōtō Zen spread out to the west.

=== Shunryū Suzuki ===
Shunryū Suzuki played a central role in bringing Sōtō to the west. Suzuki studied at Komazawa University, the Sōtō Zen university in Tokyo. In 1959 Suzuki arrived in California to attend to Soko-ji, at that time the sole Sōtō temple in San Francisco. His book Zen Mind, Beginner's Mind has become a classic in western Zen culture. Suzuki's teaching of Shikantaza and Zen practice led to the formation of the San Francisco Zen Center, one of the largest and most successful Zen organizations in the West. The training monastery of the San Francisco Zen center, at Tassajara Hot Springs in central California, was the first Buddhist Monastery to be established outside Asia. Today SFZC includes Tassajara Monastery, Green Gulch Farm, and City Center. Various Zen Centers around the U.S. are part of the dharma lineage of San Francisco Zen Center and maintain close organizational ties with it.

Suzuki's assistant Dainin Katagiri was invited to come to Minneapolis, Minnesota, where he moved in 1972 after Suzuki's death. Katagiri and his students built four Sōtō Zen centers within Minneapolis–Saint Paul. (Note: Chadwick, David (c. 1997). "Crooked Cucumber: Interview With Tomoe Katagiri". Crooked Cucumber Archives. Archived from the original on 2012-02-07. and "Dainin Katagiri Lineage". Sweeping Zen. Archived from the original on June 5, 2012.)

=== Sanbo Kyodan ===
The Sanbo Kyodan is a lay Zen sect with elements of both the Soto and the Rinzai traditions started by Haku'un Yasutani, and later Kōun Yamada. It was renamed Sanbo-Zen International in 2014.

In Europe the Sanbo Kyodan has been influential via Hugo Enomiya-Lassalle, and via students of disgraced Zen monk Dennis Genpo Merzel, especially in the Netherlands.

=== Antai-ji ===
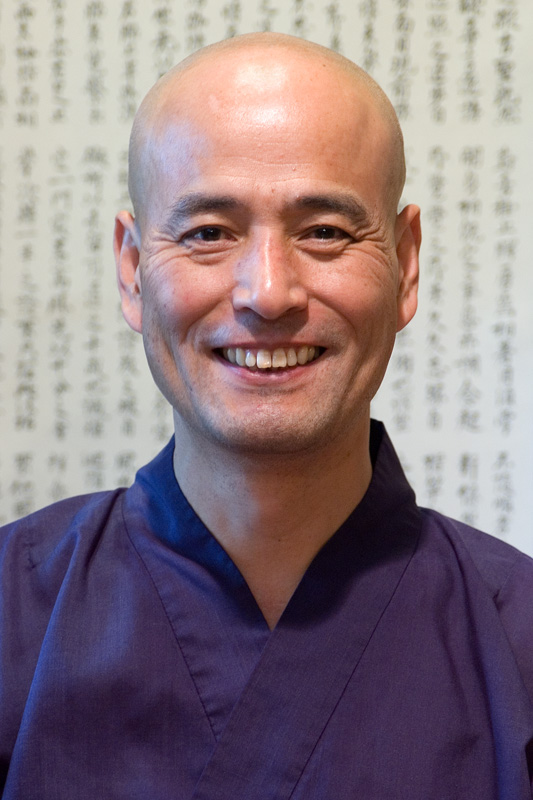
Shohaku Okumura

The Antaiji-based lineage of Kōdō Sawaki is also widespread. Sawaki's student and successor as abbot Kōshō Uchiyama was the teacher of Shōhaku Okumura who established the Sanshin Zen Community in Bloomington, Indiana, and his student Gudō Wafu Nishijima was Brad Warner's teacher. Another of Sawaki's students, Taisen Deshimaru, travelled to France where he became Kaikyosokan (head of Japanese Soto Zen for a particular country or continent) in Europe. Deshimaru founded the Association Zen Internationale in 1970, which is now the oldest and largest Zen association in Europe, with affiliated sanghas in France, Spain, Germany, Italy, the United Kingdom and other countries.

=== Soto Zen Buddhist Association ===
The larger majority of North American Sōtō priests (Note: although including Japanese nationals, mainly those of American and specifically European descent) joined in 1996 to form the Soto Zen Buddhist Association. While institutionally independent of the Japanese Sōtōshū, the Sōtō Zen Buddhist Association works closely with what most members see as their parent organization. With about one hundred fully transmitted priests, the Sōtō Zen Buddhist Association now represents about 80% of Western Sōtō teachers. The Soto Zen Buddhist Association approved a document honoring the women ancestors in the Zen tradition at its biannual meeting on October 8, 2010. Female ancestors, dating back 2,500 years from India, China, and Japan, may now be included in the curriculum, ritual, and training offered to Western Zen students.

== Practice ==
Daily services in Sōtō monasteries include chanting of sutras and dharanis.

=== Shikantaza ===
In the Sōtō school of Zen, Shikantaza, meditation with no objects, anchors, or content, is the primary form of practice. The meditator strives to be aware of the stream of thoughts, allowing them to arise and pass away without interference.

Considerable textual, philosophical, and phenomenological justification of this practice can be found throughout Dōgen's works:

In the first works he wrote after his return to Japan, the Fukan zazengi (Principles for the universal promotion of zazen) and Bendōwa (Distinguishing the Way), he advocated zazen (seated meditation) as the supreme Buddhist practice for both monks and laypersons.

Other important texts promoting zazen are the Shōbōgenzō, and the "Principles of Zazen" and the "Universally Recommended Instructions for Zazen".

=== Sōtō versus Rinzai ===
Sōtō Zen was often given the derogatory name "farmer Zen" because of its mass appeal. Some teachers of Zen would say that it was called "farmer Zen" because of its down-to-earth approach, while the Rinzai school was often called "samurai Zen" because of the larger samurai following. The latter term for the Rinzai can be somewhat misleading, however, as the Sōtō school also had samurai among its rosters.

== Texts ==
=== Sutras ===
Sōtō Zen, like all of Zen, relies on the Prajnaparamita Sutras, as well as general Mahayana Buddhist sutras, such as the Lotus Sutra, the Brahma Net Sutra and the Lankavatara Sutra. Zen is influenced in large part by the Yogacara school of philosophy as well as the Huayan school.

Until the promotion of Dogen studies in modern times, the study of Chinese texts was prevalent in Sōtō:

After textual learning was revived during the early Tokugawa period, most Japanese Sōtō monks still studied only well-known Chinese Buddhist scriptures or classic Chinese Zen texts. Eventually a few scholarly monks like Menzan Zuihō began to study Dōgen's writings, but they were the exceptions. Even when scholarly monks read Dōgen's writings, they usually did not lecture on them to their disciples.

=== Sōtō Zen texts ===
Shih-t'ou Hsi-ch'ien's (Shitou Xiqien, Sekito Kisen, 700–790) poem "The Harmony of Difference and Sameness" is an important early expression of Zen Buddhism and is chanted in Sōtō temples to this day.

One of the poems of Tung-shan Liang-chieh, the founder of Sōtō, "The Song of the Jewel Mirror Awareness" is also chanted in Sōtō temples. Another set of his poems on the Five Positions (Five Ranks) of Absolute and Relative is important as a set of kōans in the Rinzai school.

Other texts typically chanted in Sōtō Zen temples include the Heart Sutra (Hannyashingyō), and Dōgen's Fukanzazengi (Universally Recommended Instructions for Zazen).

==== Dōgen ====
Dōgen's teaching is characterized by the identification of practice as enlightenment itself. This is to be found in the Shōbōgenzō. The popularity of this huge body of texts is from a relatively recent date:

Today, when someone remembers Dōgen or thinks of Sōtō Zen, most often that person automatically thinks of Dōgen's Shōbōgenzō. This kind of automatic association of Dōgen with this work is very much a modern development. By the end of the fifteenth century most of Dōgen's writings had been hidden from view in temple vaults where they became secret treasures ... In earlier generations only one Zen teacher, Nishiari Bokusan (1821–1910), is known to have ever lectured on how the Shōbōgenzō should be read and understood.

The study of Dōgen, and especially his Shobogenzo, has become the norm in the 20th century:

Beginning in 1905 Eiheiji organized its first Shōbōgenzō conference (Genzō e) ... Since 1905 it has become an annual event at Eiheiji, and over time it gradually changed the direction of Sōtō Zen monastic education ... Sōtan's lectures provided a model that could be emulated by each of the other Zen monks who came to Eiheiji. This model has become the norm, not the exception. Today every Sōtō Zen teacher lectures on Dōgen's Shōbōgenzō.

== Organisation ==
Sōtō's head temples (honzan)

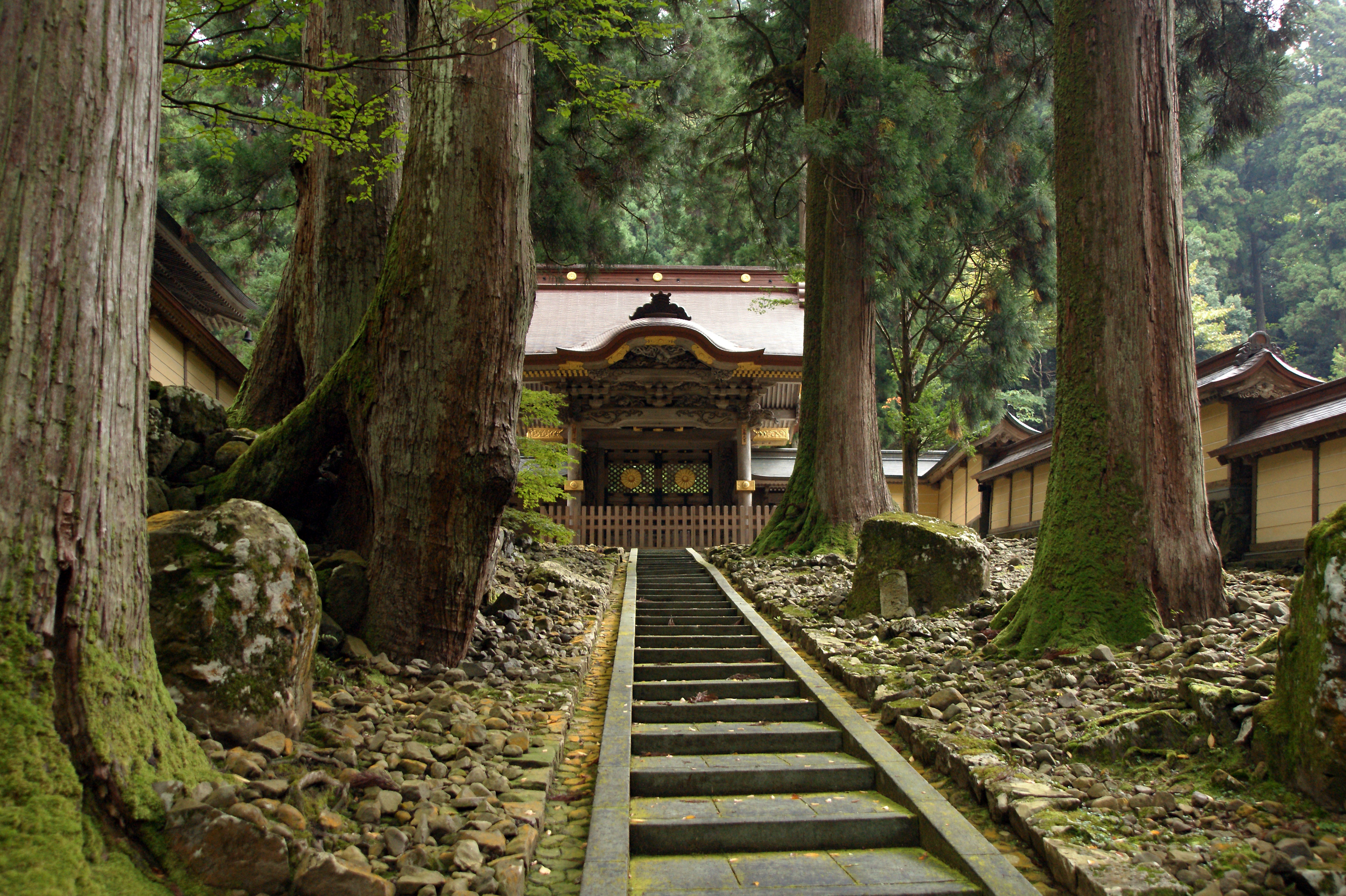
Eihei-ji

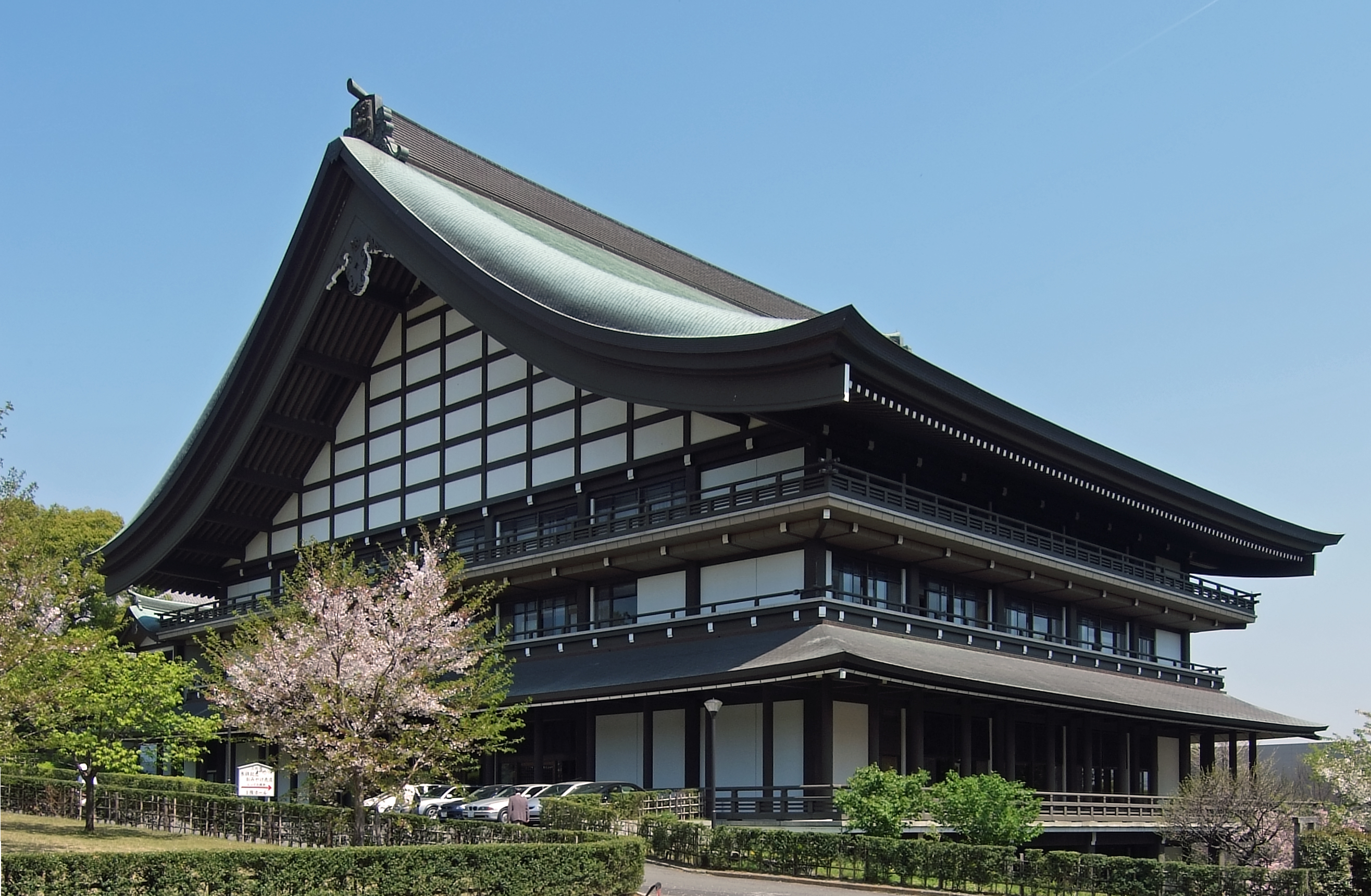
Sōji-ji

The Sōtō-shū organisation has an elaborate organisation. (Note: See Sōtō-shū organisation for an organogram) It consists of about 15,000 temples. There are circa 30 training centers, where Sōtō monks can train to become an oshō or priest and run their own temple.

=== Head and parliament ===
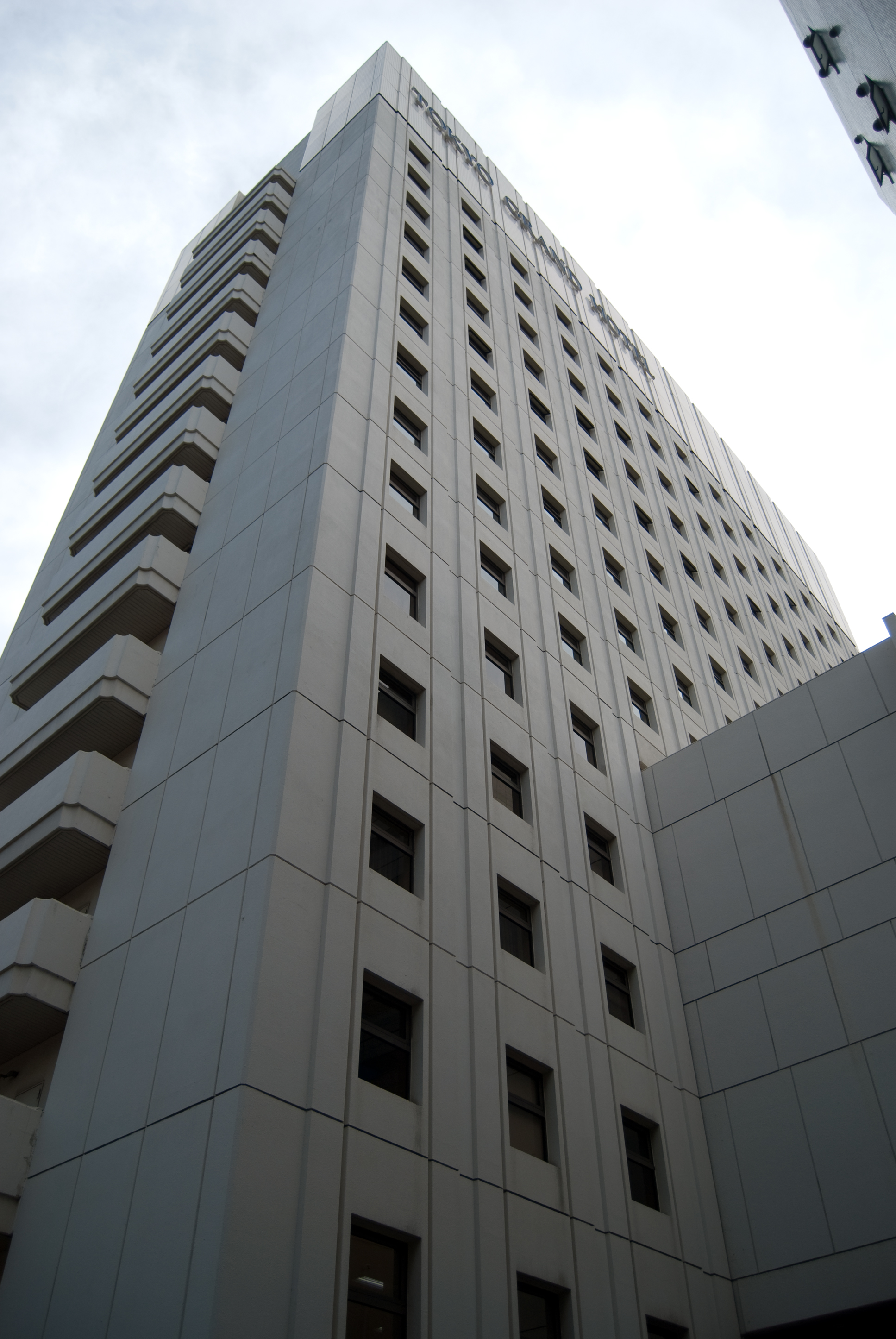
Sōtō Zen headquarters, Minato-ku, Tokyo, Japan

Sōtō-shu has a centralised organisation, run by a head:

Sōtō-shū is a democratic organization with a head (called 宗務総長 Shūmusōchō) that is elected by a parliament. The parliament in turn consist of 72 priests that are elected in 36 districts throughout Japan, 2 from each district. The Shūmusōchō selects a cabinet that consists of him and seven other priests who together govern the organization. It is commonly believed that the Kanchō, who is either the head of Eiheiji or Sōjiji, the two head temples, is the boss of Sōtō-shū. This is not the case. The Kanchō has only representational functions; the real power lies with the Shūmusōchō and his cabinet.

=== Temples ===
Contemporary Sōtō-shū has four classes of temples:

1. Honzan (本山), head temples, namely Eihei-ji and Sōji-ji;
2. Kakuchi, teaching monasteries, where at least once a year an ango (ninety-day retreat) takes place;
3. Hōchi, dharma temples;
4. Jun hōchi, ordinary temples.

While Eihei-ji owes its existence to Dōgen, throughout history this head temple has had significantly fewer sub-temple affiliates than the Sōji-ji. During the Tokugawa period, Eiheiji had approximately 1,300 affiliate temples compared to Sōji-ji's 16,200. Furthermore, out of the more than 14,000 temples of the Sōtō sect today, 13,850 of those identify themselves as affiliates of Sōji-ji. Additionally, most of the some 148 temples that are affiliates of Eiheiji today are only minor temples located in Hokkaido—founded during a period of colonization during the Meiji period. Therefore, it is often said that Eiheiji is a head temple only in the sense that it is head of all Sōtō dharma lineages.

=== Legal status ===
The Sōtū-shū is an "umbrella (hokatsu) organization for affiliated temples and organizations". It has "three sets of governing documents":

1. Sōtōshū Constitution (Sotoshu shuken);
2. Regulations for the Religious Juridical Person Sōtōshu (Shūkyō hōnin Sōtōshū kisoku);
3. Sōtōshū Standard Procedures (Sōtōshū kitei).

== See also ==
Persons

- Taizan Maezumi
- Gudō Wafu Nishijima
- Muhō Noelke
- Kōdō Sawaki
- Shunryū Suzuki

Practice

- Kōan
- Shikantaza
- Zazen

Chinese Chan

- Caodong
- Chinese Chan

Japanese Zen

- Japanese Buddhism
- Japanese Zen

Temples

- Antai-ji
- Eihei-ji

== Sources ==
- Anderson, Reb (2001). Being Upright: Zen Meditation and the Bodhisattva Precepts. Rodmell Press. ISBN 0-9627138-9-9. OCLC 44414111.
- Bodiford, William M. (1991), Dharma Transmission in Soto Zen. Manzan Dohaku's Reform Movement. In: Monumenta Nipponica, Vol.46, No.4 (Winter, 1991), pp 423-451
- Bodiford, William M. (1992), Zen in the Art of Funerals: Ritual Salvation in Japanese Buddhism. In: 'History of Religions' 32, no. 2 (1992): 150
- Bodiford, William M. (1993). Sōtō Zen in Medieval Japan. University of Hawaii Press. ISBN 0-8248-1482-7.
- Bodiford, William M. (2006). "Remembering Dōgen: Eiheiji and Dōgen Hagiography". Society for Japanese Studies. 32 (1): 1–21. doi:10.1353/jjs.2006.0003. ISSN 1549-4721. S2CID 144431743. Archived from the original on 2012-05-16.
- Bodiford, William (2006b), Koan practice. In: John Daido Loori (ed)(2006), "Sitting with koans. Essential writings on the practice of Zen koan introspection", Boston: Wisdom Publications
- Bodiford, William M. (2008), Dharma Transmission in Theory and Practice. In: Zen Ritual: Studies of Zen Buddhist Theory in Practice (PDF), Oxford University Press
- Coleman, James William (2001). The New Buddhism: The Western Transformation of an Ancient Tradition. Oxford University Press. ISBN 0-19-515241-7. OCLC 48932003.
- Dōgen, Eihei (1971). Primer of Sōtō Zen: A Translation of Dōgen's Shōbōgenzō Zuimonki. Masunaga, R. (trans). (East West Center Book) University of Hawaii Press. ISBN 0-8248-0357-4.
- Dumoulin, Heinrich (2005), Zen Buddhism: A History. Volume 2: Japan, World Wisdom Books, ISBN 978-0-941532-90-7
- Faure, Bernard (1986). Visions of Power: Imagining Medieval Japanese Buddhism. Princeton University Press. ISBN 0-691-02941-5. OCLC 44599484.
- Ford, James Ishmael (2006). Zen Master Who?: A Guide to the People and Stories of Zen. Wisdom Publications. ISBN 0-86171-509-8. OCLC 70174891.
- Foulk, T. Griffith (n.d.), History of the Soto Zen School, archived from the original on 2012-05-16
- Hall, John Whitney (1988). The Cambridge History of Japan. Cambridge University Press. ISBN 0-521-22352-0. OCLC 17483588.
- Harvey, Peter (1990). An Introduction to Buddhism: Teachings, History, and Practices. Cambridge University Press. ISBN 0-521-31333-3. OCLC 19589186.
- Heine, Steven; Wright, Dale S. (2000). The Koan: Texts and Contexts in Zen Buddhism. Oxford University Press. ISBN 0-19-511748-4. OCLC 41090651.
- Heine, Steven (2004). "Kōans In The Dōgen Tradition: How and Why Dōgen Does What He Does With Kōans". Philosophy East & West. 54 (1). University of Hawaii Press: 1–19, 19p. doi:10.1353/pew.2003.0052. ISSN 0031-8221. OCLC 1485347. S2CID 12537597.
- Juergensmeyer, Mark (2006). The Oxford Handbook of Global Religions. Oxford University Press. ISBN 0-19-513798-1. OCLC 64084086.
- Kay, David N. (2004). Tibetan and Zen Buddhism in Britain: Transplantation, Development and Adaptation. Routledge. ISBN 0-415-29765-6. OCLC 51315294.
- Koho, K.C. (2000) Sōtō Zen: An Introduction to the Thought of the Serene Reflection Meditation School of Buddhism, Shasta Abbey Press, ISBN 0-930066-09-X
- Lachs, Stuart (1999), Means of Authorization: Establishing Hierarchy in Ch'an /Zen Buddhism in America, archived from the original on 2022-03-19
- Leighton, Taigen Daniel (2000). Cultivating the Empty Field: The Silent Illumination of Zen Master Hongzhi. Tuttle Publishing. ISBN 0-8048-3240-4. OCLC 43978646.
- Loori, John Daido (1996). The Heart of Being: Moral and Ethical Teachings of Zen Buddhism. Tuttle Publishing. ISBN 0-8048-3078-9. OCLC 42855782.
- Lu, David J. (1997). Japan: A Documentary History. M.E. Sharpe. ISBN 1-56324-907-3. OCLC 34876074.
- Masunaga, Reihō (1969) [1968]. Sekai hyakka jiten 世界百科事典. Vol. 13. Heibonsha.
- McMahan, David L. (2008), The Making of Buddhist Modernism, Oxford University Press, ISBN 978-0-19-518327-6
- Mohr, Michel (1994), Zen Buddhism during the Tokugawa period: The challenge to go beyond sectarian consciousness. In: Japanese Journal of Religious Studies, vol. 21 no. 4, December 1994, pp. 341–72 (PDF), archived (PDF) from the original on 2011-08-11
- O'Halloran, Maura (2007). Pure Heart, Enlightened Mind: The Life and Letters of an Irish Zen Saint. Wisdom Publications. ISBN 978-0-86171-283-0. OCLC 83977483.
- Oldmeadow, Harry (2004). Journeys East: 20th Century Western Encounters with Eastern Religious Traditions. World Wisdom, Inc. p. 528. ISBN 0-941532-57-7. OCLC 54843891.
- Prebish, Charles S.; Heine, Steven (2003). Buddhism in the Modern World: Adaptations of an Ancient Tradition. Oxford University Press. ISBN 0-19-514698-0. OCLC 50730942.
- Senauke, Hozan Alan (April 2006). "A Long and Winding Road: Sōtō Zen Training in America". Teaching Theology & Religion. 9 (2). Blackwell Publishers: 127–132, 6p. doi:10.1111/j.1467-9647.2006.00274.x. ISSN 1467-9647.
- Sharf, Robert H. (August 1993), "The Zen of Japanese Nationalism", History of Religions, 33 (1): 1–43, doi:10.1086/463354, S2CID 161535877, archived from the original on 2020-12-29
- Shimano, Eido Tai (1996), Dai Bosatsu Mandala. A Portrait of Soen Nakagawa. In: Kazuaki Tanahashi & Roko Sherry Chayat (1996), Endless Vow. The Zen Path of Soen Nakagawa, Boston, Massachusetts: Shambhala Publications, Inc
- Slater, Peter (1977). Religion and Culture in Canada: Essays by Members of the Canadian Society. Wilfrid Laurier University Press. ISBN 9780889206113.
- Snelling, John (1987), The Buddhist handbook. A Complete Guide to Buddhist Teaching and Practice, London: Century Paperbacks
- Spuler, Michelle (2003). Developments in Australian Buddhism: Facets of the Diamond. Routledge. ISBN 0-7007-1582-7. OCLC 49952207.
- Tetsuo, Otani (2003), To Transmit Dogen Zenji's Dharma (PDF)
- Victoria, Brian Daizen (2006), Zen at war (Second ed.), Lanham e.a.: Rowman & Littlefield Publishers, Inc.
- Victoria, Brian Daizen (2010), "The "Negative Side" of D. T. Suzuki's Relationship to War" (PDF), The Eastern Buddhist, 41 (2): 97–138, archived (PDF) from the original on 2012-01-20
- Warner, Brad (2007). Sit Down and Shut Up: Punk Rock Commentaries on Buddha, God, Truth, Sex, Death, & Dōgen's Treasury of the Right Dharma Eye, New World Library, ISBN 978-1-57731-559-9
- Wegner, Michael (2001), Introduction to "Branching streams flow in the darkness: Zen talks on the Sandokai"by Shunryū Suzuki, University of California Press, ISBN 978-0-520-23212-9
- Williams, D. R. (2004) The Other Side of Zen: A Social History of Sōtō Zen Buddhism in Tokugawa Japan (Buddhisms: A Princeton University Press Series), Princeton University Press, ISBN 0-691-11928-7
- Yampolsky, Philip B. (1985). The Zen Master Hakuin. Columbia University Press. ISBN 0-231-06041-6. OCLC 185642013.
