= Nōnin =

Japanese Buddhist monk

Dainichibō Nōnin 大日房能忍
- Title: Zen Master
- Died: c. 1196

Religious life
- Religion: Buddhism
- School: Zen
- Lineage: Daruma School

Senior posting
- Predecessor: Zhuóān Déguāng
- Successor: Kakuan
- Students: Kakuan

Dainichibō Nōnin (大日房能忍) (fl. 1190s) was a Japanese Buddhist monk who started the first Zen school in Japan called the Darumashū, or "Bodhidharma school."

== Biography ==
While a monk with the Tendai school, Nōnin came across Zen texts which had been brought from China. In 1189, he dispatched two of his disciples to China to meet with Zhuóān Déguāng (拙庵德光, 1121–1203), himself a student of the Rinzai master Dahui Zonggao. The disciples presented a letter Nōnin had written describing his realization from practicing Zen on his own. Deguang apparently approved and sent a letter certifying Nōnin’s enlightenment.

== Daruma-school ==
The Daruma-school depended on two sources for their teachings: early Chán as "transmitted on Hiei-zan within the Tendai tradition", with clear elements of teachings from the Northern School, and the Chinese Rinzai-school. The Chán-teaching of 'inherent awakening', or hongaku, influenced the Tendai-teachings. It explains:

[T]he principle of non-duality between Buddha and sentient beings, or between nirvana and samsara. This principle was expressed in many ways, the best known being the dictum, 'The mind itself is the Buddha.'

Eisai gives the following report of the Daruma-shū in the Seijin ketsugiron, the third book of his Kōzen gokokuron:

Someone asked: "Some people recklessly call the Daruma-shū the Zen sect. But they [the Daruma-shū adepts] themselves say that there are no precepts to follow, no practices to engage in. From the outset there are no passions; from the beginning we are enlightened. Therefore do not practice, do not follow the precepts, eat when hungry, rest when tired. Why practice nembutsu, why give maigre feasts, why curtail eating? How can this be?" Eisai replied that the adherents of the Daruma-shū are those who are described in the sūtras as having a false view of emptiness. One must not speak with them or associate with them, and must keep as far away as possible.

Because of his nonstandard Dharma transmission and extensive blending of various teachings, his school was heavily criticized. Heinrich Dumoulin wrote of Nōnin:

Nonin did not adopt Ta-hui’s form of Zen. His own style came from the Zen meditation practiced in Tendai, which resonates with the early Zen of the Northern school first introduced from China by its founder Saichō. He drew copiously from the Sugyoroku, which was studied zealously on Mt. Hiei. In this way he fused Zen and the teachings of the sutras (zenkyo itchi). He also incorporated into his doctrine and practice elements of Tendai esotericism (taimitsu). He did not engage in the practice of koan. The Zen of the Daruma school, as its texts show, distinguished itself in this way from the Rinzai Zen of the Sung period in the line of Ta-hui.

On the other hand, in opposition to this supposed diversity of teachings, Hee-Jin Kim states:

Nōnin was the favorite among Japanese Buddhists to establish a "pure Zen" (junsui-zen) in the country over the traditional "mixed Zen"(kenju-zen).

The Bodhidharma School apparently drew a number of followers, but in 1194 the Tendai establishment requested that the government have it shut down. They accepted the proposal for the school "being 'incomprehensible' and circulating nonsense." His students continued the school for a brief time, but eventually they dispersed to study with Dōgen or Eisai. In fact, Koun Ejō and Tettsū Gikai, both prominent students of Dōgen to whom nearly all modern Soto Zen teachers trace their lineages, were originally students of Nonin's successors. The transfer of Dogen to Echizen in 1243 may in part have been due "to the fact that the Daruma-shu had a strong following in that province".

There may have been members of the Daruma-school until the Ōnin War 1467–1477, which destroyed much of Zen monasticism.

== See also ==
- Mushi dokugo

== Sources ==
- Dumoulin, Heinrich (2005), Zen Buddhism: A History. Volume 2: Japan, World Wisdom Books, ISBN 9780941532907
- Faure, Bernard (Spring 1987), "The Daruma-shū, Dōgen, and Sōtō Zen", Monumenta Nipponica, 42 (1): 25–55, doi:10.2307/2385038, JSTOR 2385038
- Heine, Steven (2006), Dogen and the precepts, revisited. In: Buddhist Studies From India To America: Essays In Honor Of Charles S. Prebish, Taylor & Francis
- Matsunaga, Alicia; Matsunaga, Daigan (1988), Foundation of Japanese Buddhism, Los Angeles: Buddhist Books International
- Kim, Hee-Jin (2004), Eihei Dogen Mystical Realist, Wisdom Publications, p. 45
