= Eihei-ji =

Buddhist temple in Fukui Prefecture, Japan

Eihei-ji 永平寺
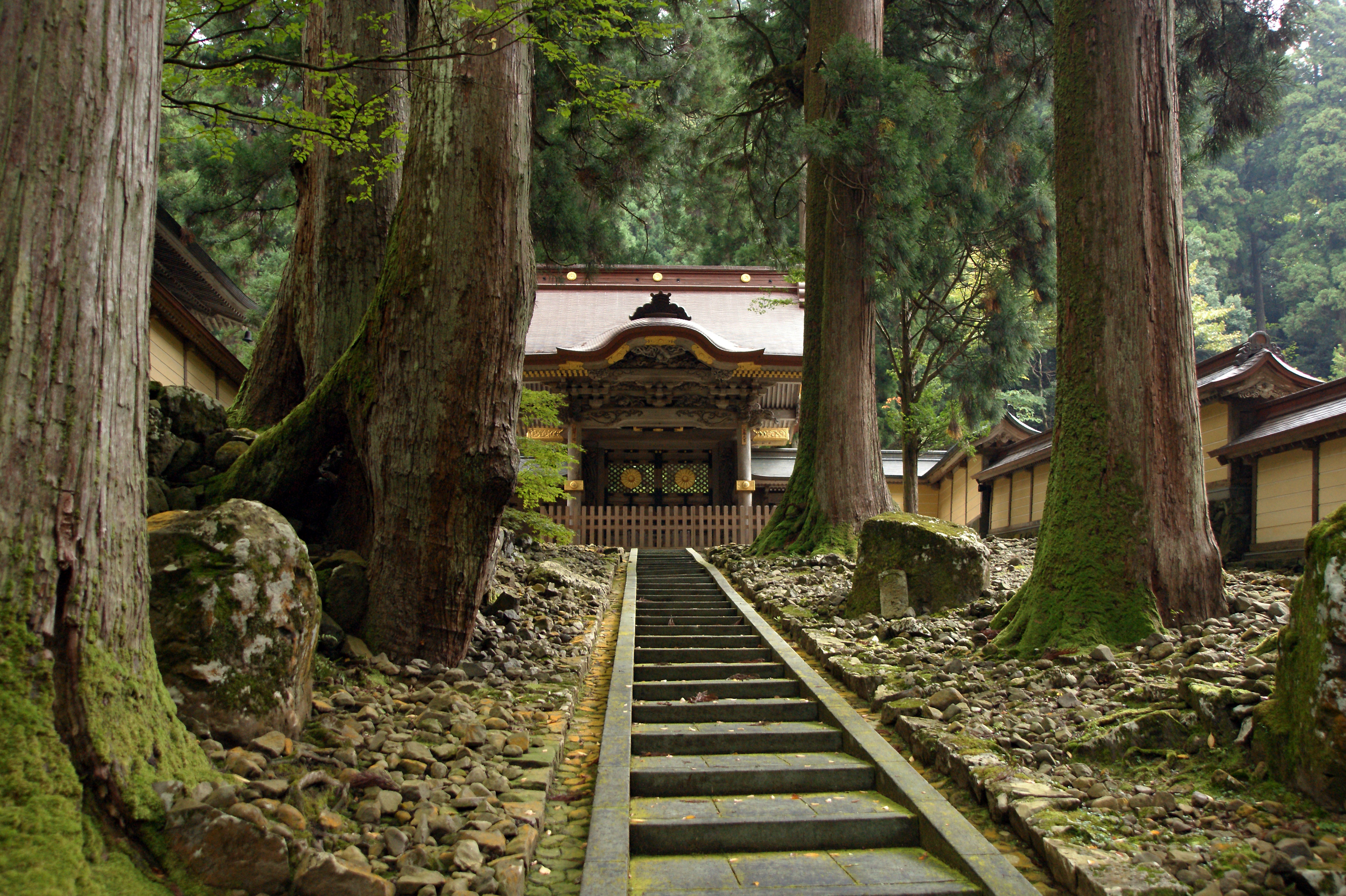

- Eihei-ji Eihei-ji (Japan)

Religion
- Affiliation: Buddhism
- Deity: Shaka Nyorai (Śākyamuni); Miroku Butsu (Maitreya); Amida Nyorai (Amitābha)
- Rite: Sōtō Zen
- Status: Head Temple

Location
- Location: 5-15 Shihi, Eiheiji-chō, Yoshida District, Fukui Prefecture
- Country: Japan
- Coordinates: 36°3′11″N 136°21′20″E

Architecture
- Founder: Dōgen
- Completed: 1244
- National Treasure National Important Cultural Property

Eihei-ji (永平寺) is one of two main temples of the Sōtō school of Zen Buddhism, the largest single religious denomination in Japan (by number of temples in a single legal entity). The other is Sōji-ji in Yokohama. Eihei-ji is located about 15 km (9 mi) east of Fukui in Fukui Prefecture, Japan. In English, its name means "temple of eternal peace" (in Japanese, 'ei' means "eternal", 'hei' means "peaceful", and 'ji' means "Buddhist temple").

Its founder was Eihei Dōgen, who brought Sōtō Zen from China to Japan during the 13th century. The ashes of Dōgen and a memorial to him are in the Jōyōden (the Founder's Hall) at Eihei-ji. William Bodiford of UCLA writes that, "The rural monastery Eiheiji in particular aggrandized Dōgen to bolster its own authority vis-à-vis its institutional rivals within the Sōtō denomination."

Eihei-ji is a training monastery with more than two hundred monks and nuns in residence. As of 2003, Eihei-ji had 800,000 visitors per year, less than half the number of tourists who came ten years before. Visitors with Zen experience may participate after making prior arrangements, and all visitors are treated as religious trainees.

In keeping with Zen's Mahayana tradition, the iconography in various buildings is an array of potential confusion for newcomers: at the Sanmon are four kings standing guard named Shitenno; the Buddha hall's main altar has three statues of Buddhas past, present and future; the Hatto displays Kannon the bodhisattva of compassion, and four white lions (called the a-un no shishi); the Yokushitsu has Baddabara; the Sanshokaku has a statue of Hotei; and the Tosu displays Ucchusma.

== History ==
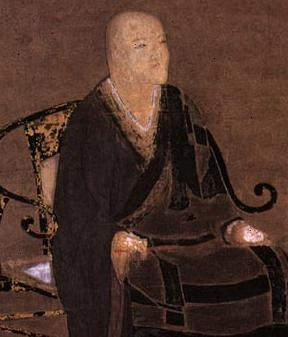
Dōgen founded the temple in 1244.

Dōgen became a monk at age 14 and studied at Enryaku-ji on Mount Hiei. At age 24, he traveled to Song China and became a disciple of Rujing at Tiantong Temple on Mount Tendo, where he devoted himself to zazen. He returned to Japan, carrying on the Zen tradition of "shikantaza" (simple sitting). He initially resided at Kennin-ji in Kyoto, and later built Kōshō-ji in the suburbs of Fukakusa (abolished and later rebuilt in Uji, Kyoto), where he devoted himself to preaching and writing. However, he faced severe persecution from the Tendai Buddhist forces on Mount Hiei. At the request of one of his followers, a samurai named Hatano Yoshishige, Dōgen left Kōshō-ji Temple in 1243 and relocated to Shibishō in Echizen Province, where Yoshishige's territory was located. Yoshishige initially invited Dōgen to take over Yoshimine-ji, a Tendai temple, associated with the Hakusan mountain cult, was located in the snowy mountains. Dōgen spent the winter here, and the following year, in 1244, he built Sanshoho Daibutsu-ji, closer to the village than Yoshimine-ji. This marked the founding of Eihei-ji, and in 1246, the temple name was changed to Kisshōzan Eihei-ji. The temple name comes from "Eihei," the era name during the reign of Emperor Ming of the Later Han Dynasty, when Buddhism was first introduced to China, and means "eternal peace."

Dōgen appointed a successor, but sometime after his death the abbacy of Eihei-ji became hotly disputed, a schism now called the sandai sōron. Until 1468, Eihei-ji was not held by the current Keizan line of Sōtō, but by the line of Dōgen's Chinese disciple Jakuen. At one point, the temple fell into such decline that it was practically abandoned, but the 5th abbot, Giun, rebuilt it and established the foundations that continue to this day. After 1468, when the Keizan line took ownership of Eihei-ji in addition to its major temple Sōji-ji and others, Jakuen's line and other alternate lines became less prominent.

As Eihei-ji and Sōji-ji became rivals over the centuries, Eihei-ji made claims based on the fact of Dōgen's original residence there. William Bodiford of UCLA wrote:

"Dōgen's memory has helped keep Eihei-ji financially secure, in good repair, and filled with monks and lay pilgrims who look to Dōgen for religious inspiration. Eiheiji has become Dōgen's place, the temple where Dōgen is remembered, where Dōgen's Zen is practiced, where Dōgen's Shōbōgenzō is published, where it is read, and where one goes to learn Dōgen's Buddhism. As we remember Dōgen, we should also remember that remembrance is not value neutral...."

The entire temple was destroyed by fire several times, most notably in 1340 and again in 1473. During the late 16th century, disciples of Ikkō-shū attacked and burned the temple and surrounding buildings. As a consequence, its oldest standing structure dates from 1794.

From the Muromachi period through the Azuchi-Momoyama period, the temple was patronized by the Imperial family. In 1615, during the early Edo period, the Tokugawa shogunate issued a decree establishing it as a head temple with equal rank to Sōji-ji.

== Physical layout ==
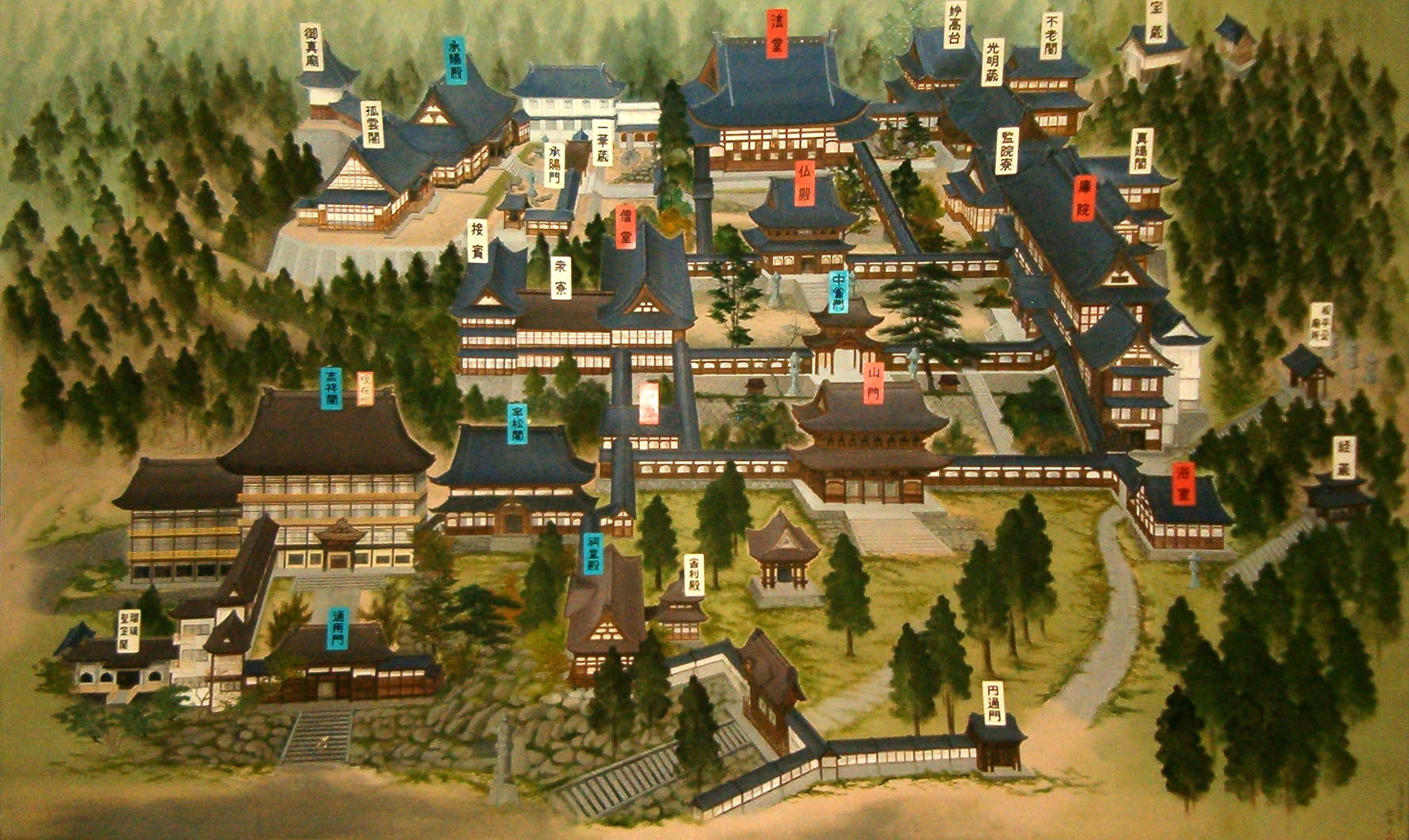
The original of this map of Eihei-ji took a priest in Aichi Prefecture 4.5 years to paint.

Today the temple grounds cover about 330,000 m^{2} (0.13 sq mi). The temple complex comprises over 70 buildings, large and small, 19 of which have been designated Important Cultural Properties of Japan. Dōgen invited carpenters from Song China, whose master would later take the name Kuro Genzaemon, to build Eihei-ji. They established a carpenters' village near the temple gate and lived there, and have been involved in the expansion, renovation, and repair of Eihei-ji for generations.

The Butsuden Main Hall contains statues of the Buddhas of the Three Times: right to left, Amida Butsu (past), Shakyamuni Butsu (present), and Miroku Bosatsu (future).

Among the temple's structures are the Sanmon (gate), Hatto (lecture hall), Sōdo (Priest's or meditation hall), Daiku-in (kitchen, three stories and a basement), Yokushitsu (bath) and Tosu (toilet, Dōgen's Shōbōgenzō includes a chapter on manners appropriate for the toilet. Most of his rules are still followed today). The Shōrō (belfry) holds the obon sho, the great brahman bell. The Shidoden (Memorial Hall) contains thousands of tablets for deceased laypersons. The Joyoden (Founders hall) contains the ashes of Dōgen and his successors. Here, images of the deceased are served food daily like they are living teachers. The Kichijokaku (visitor center) is a large four-story modern building for lay persons, with kitchen, bath, sleeping rooms and a hall for zazen.

The bronze temple bell dates to 1327 and is an Important Cultural Property. The Sanmon and Central Gate date from the 1794 rebuilding and are Prefectural Cultural Properties. A number of important manuscripts belong to the temple, including the National Treasure Universally Recommended Instructions for Zazen, by temple founder Dōgen (1233); teachings he brought back from Song China (1227); and a record of a subsidy for the earlier Sanmon in the hand of Emperor Go-En'yū (1372).

Spread over a hillside, the complex is surrounded by cedar trees, some 100 feet (30 m) tall and as old as the temple. It is surrounded by bright green moss-covered boulders, and Japanese maples that turn red and gold during autumn.

== Training ==
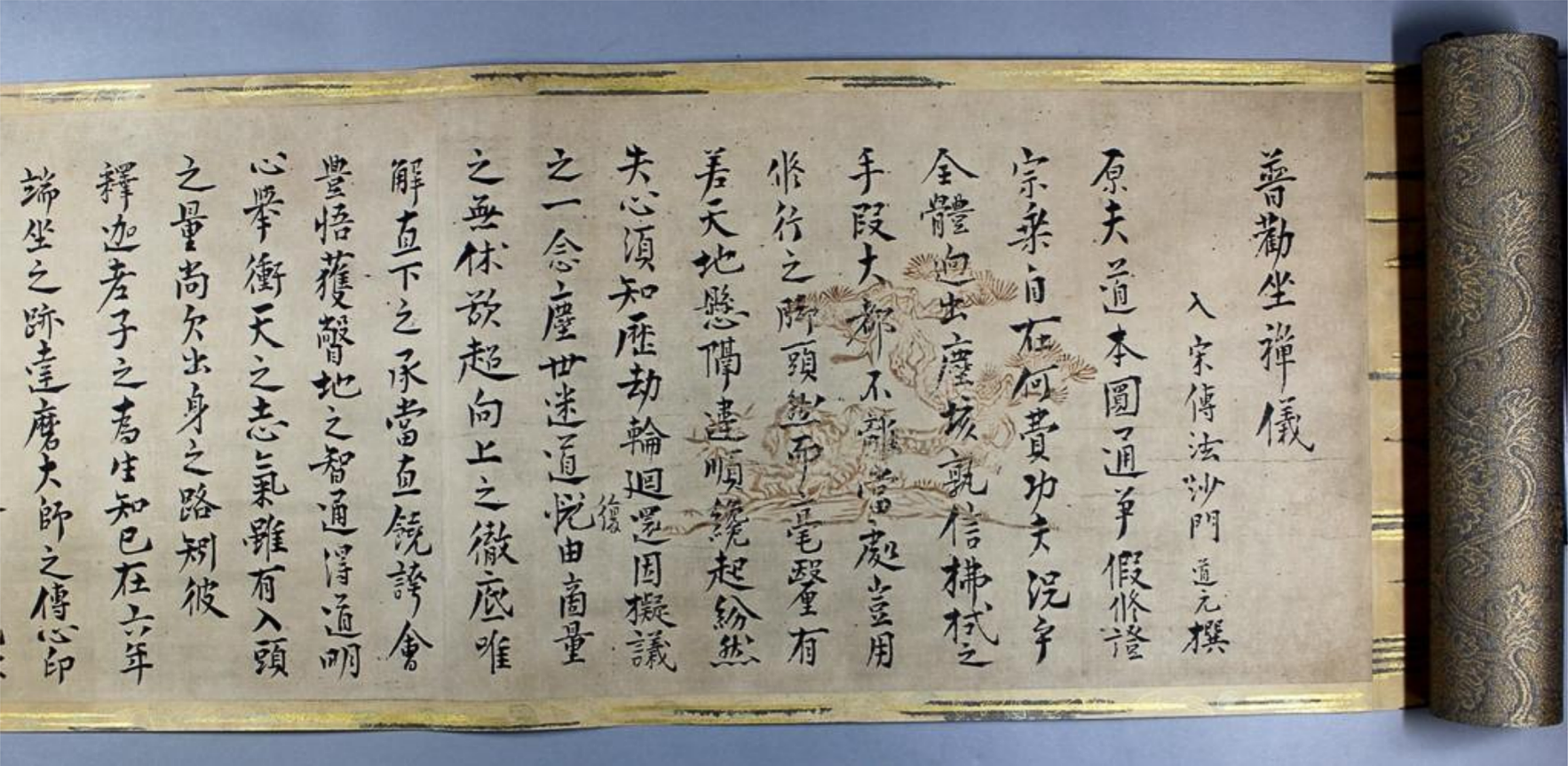
Universally Recommended Instructions for Zazen, by Dōgen, founder of Eihei-ji; 1233; National Treasure

Today, Eihei-ji is the main training temple of Sōtō Zen. The standard training for a priest in Eihei-ji is from three months to a two-year period of practice. It is in communion with all Japanese Soto Zen temples, and some temples in America, including the San Francisco Zen Center.

Fukuyama Taiho Zenji is the head priest or abbot, who oversees trainees at Eihei-ji, and also serves as the head priest of Sotoshu (the Sōtō school of Zen) for two years beginning late January 2012. Head priests at Eihei-ji and Sōji-ji alternate terms leading Sotoshu. Fukuyama Zenji is serving his second term (his first term was from January 2008 to January 2010).

About two hundred or two hundred fifty priests and nuns in training are in residence. A single tatami, a 1 metre (3.3 ft) by 2 metres (6.6 ft) mat laid in rows on a raised platform called a tan in a common room, is provided for each trainee to eat, sleep, and meditate on.

The monks start their day at 3:30 a.m., or one hour later during winter, when they do zazen and read and chant sutras. Breakfast is a bowl of rice gruel with pickles. Then they do chores: clean, weed and, if needed, shovel snow. The floors and corridors have been polished smooth by daily cleaning for hundreds of years. Then they read and chant again. Dinner at 5 p.m. is meagre and ritualized: the position of the bowl and utensils is observed. Zazen or a lecture follows before bed at 9 p.m. The trainees shave each other's heads and take a bath every five days (every time the date contains a 4 or 9).

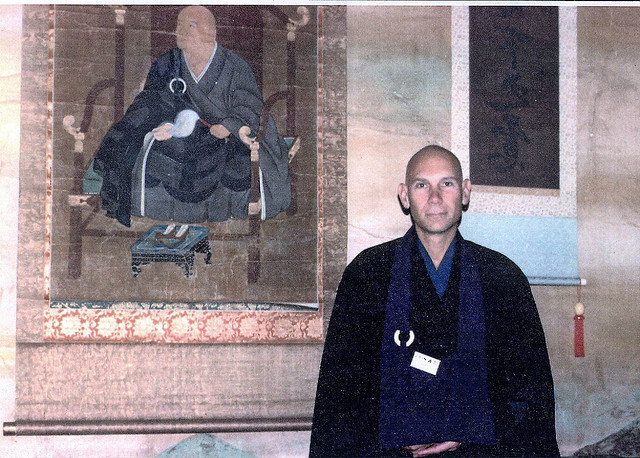
Monk after zuise, abbot for a day:. The monk is Dennis Merzel.

Eihei-ji has sought, since medieval times, a source of income by soliciting monks to purchase honorary titles. Monks may progress through four hōkai (dharma ranks) with some time requirements of months or years between ranks. The final step in becoming a priest is zuise which means becoming ichiya-no-jūshoku (abbot for one night) at both head temples (Eihei-ji and Sōji-ji). Zuise entails paying each temple 50,000 yen (about $605 as of April 2012) for the ceremony (and about $50 to the official photographer). A monk receives an honorary meal and a bag of souvenirs at Eihei-ji and then, within one month, repeats the ceremony at Sōji-ji. The monk is then considered an oshō (priest and teacher).

== Tourism ==
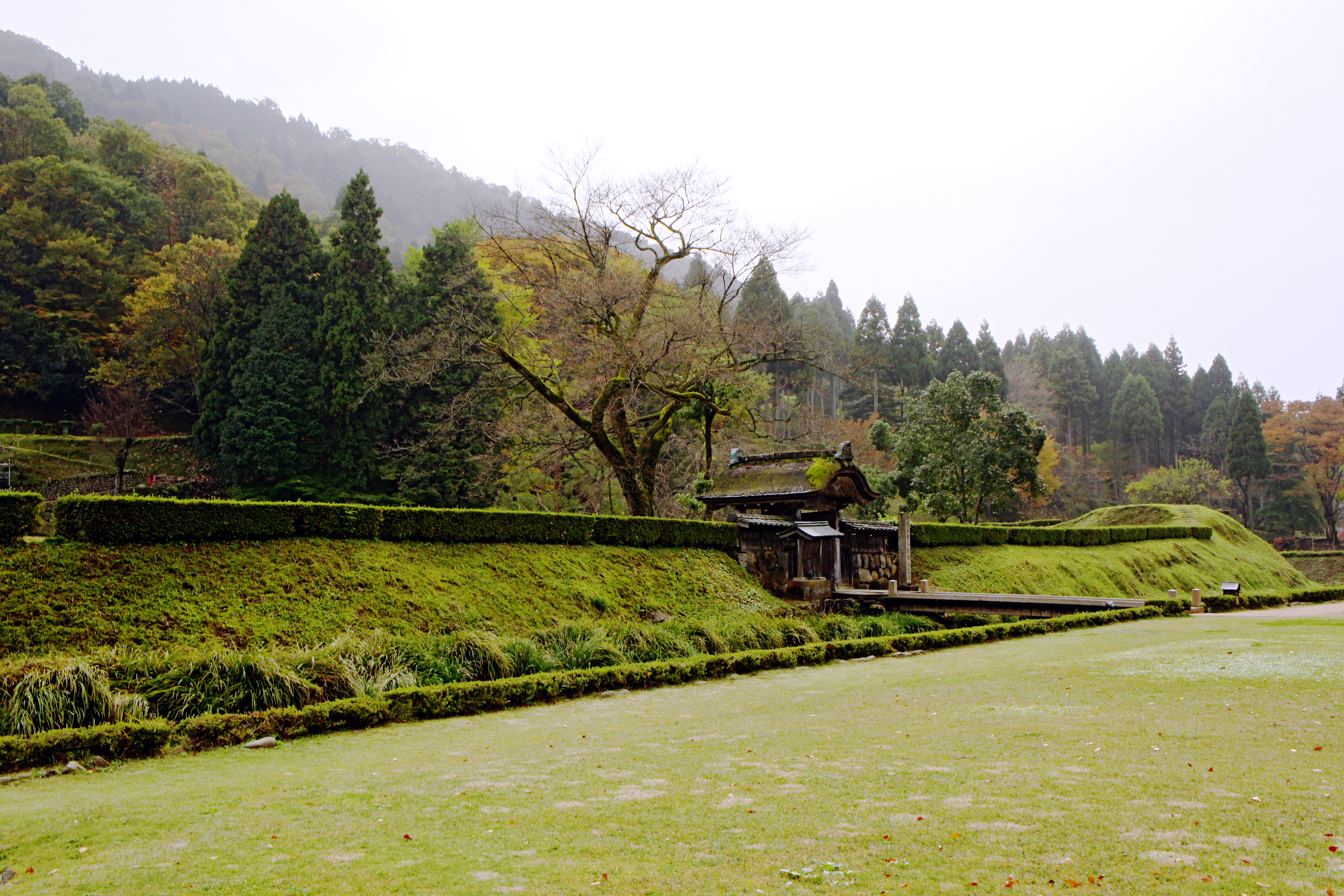
Ichijōdani Asakura Family Historic Ruins

Visitors must dress modestly and keep silent. They may attend one to three day meditation retreats for a fee. Each visitor receives a list of rules, for example photography of the priests-in-training is prohibited. More than one million visitors used to pass through the gates of Eihei-ji, but as of 2003 only 800,000 came, a period in which the train service from Fukui to nearby Eiheijiguchi Station was temporarily halted.

A memorial service, a major source of revenue for Eihei-ji, has been held every fifty years since the 16th century on the anniversary of Dōgen Zenji's entering nirvana. For example, in 1752 about 23,700 monks attended, which raised enough money to rebuild the main gate. Groups from all over the world including a group from the United States formed to make a pilgrimage to Eihei-ji for the 750th anniversary in 2002.

In 1905, Eihei-ji held its first conference called Genzō e on Dōgen Zenji's Shōbōgenzō. It succeeded in attracting so many interested parties that it became an annual event. Monks and laypersons, along with academic and popular writers can attend workshops each year.

The Ichijōdani Asakura Family Historic Ruins and museum are about 10 kilometres (6.2 mi) from Fukui and are reachable from the temple. Five generations of the Asakura daimyō clan lived there until 1573, when the town was razed by Oda Nobunaga loyalists.

A walking trail connects Eihei-ji with Yoshimine-dera Temple (Kippō-ji, 吉峯寺), another Zen temple where Dōgen had resided at, via a mountain ridge.

== Denuclearization ==
Following the 2011 Tōhoku earthquake and tsunami, according to Religious Dispatches magazine, Eihei-ji "mobilized clergy to accompany members of its volunteer organization Shanti International Association who will travel to northeastern Japan to aid in relief efforts".

Then in November 2011, priests at Eihei-ji held a symposium for 300 people called Cherish Our Lives: The Way of Living that We don't Choose Nuclear Power Generation on the subject of denuclearization. Two reactors in Fukui Prefecture were given the names of bodhisattvas: Monju Nuclear Power Plant and Fugen Nuclear Power Plant. The chairman of the Power Reactor and Nuclear Fuel Development Corporation had apparently misunderstood upon visiting the temple. When he told the abbot the proposed names, the Zenji had replied, "That's nice." After the symposium, a priest explained, "We have realized that the nuclear power generation goes against life on the earth."

== Gallery ==
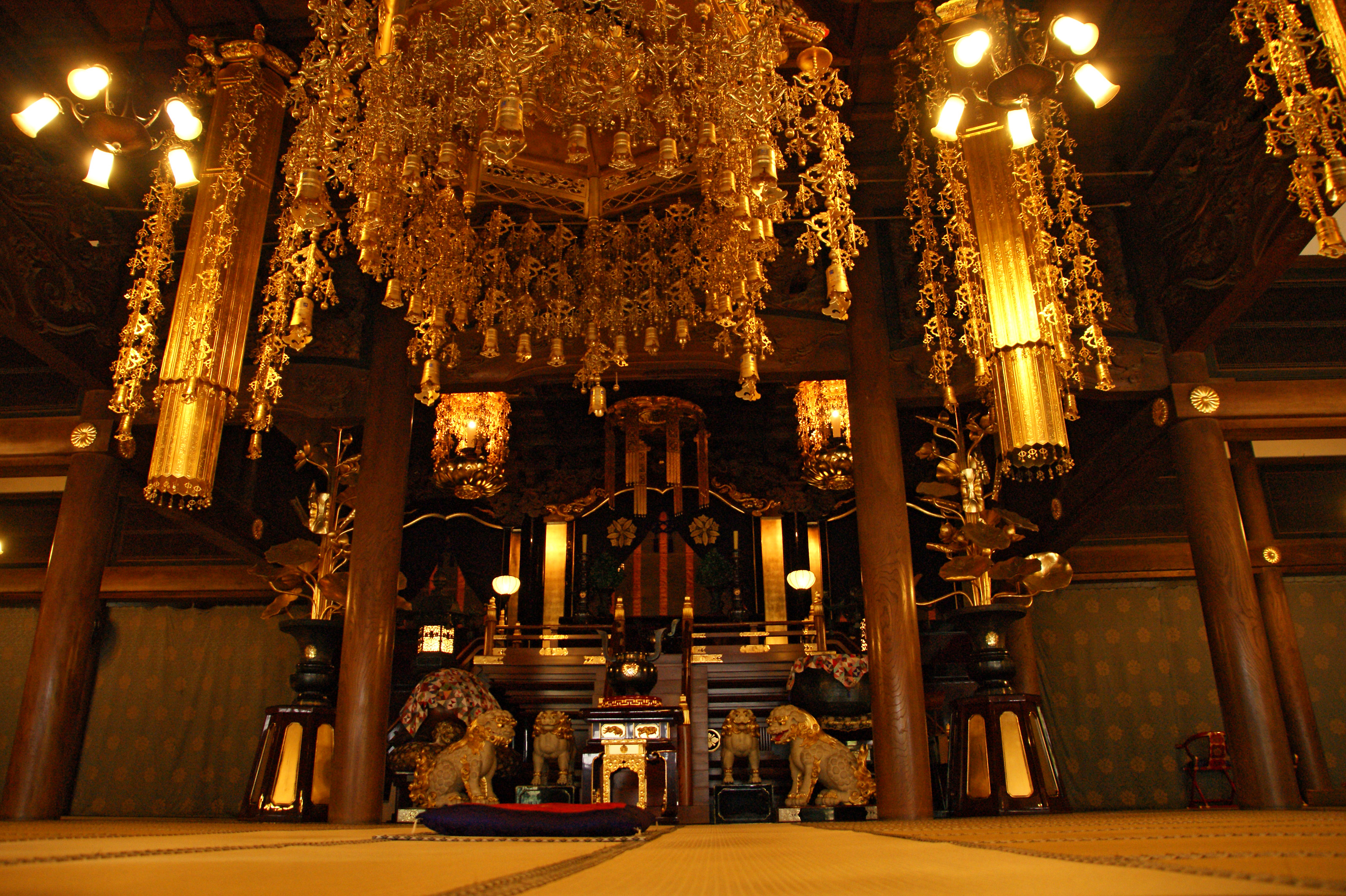
Hatto (Dharma hall)

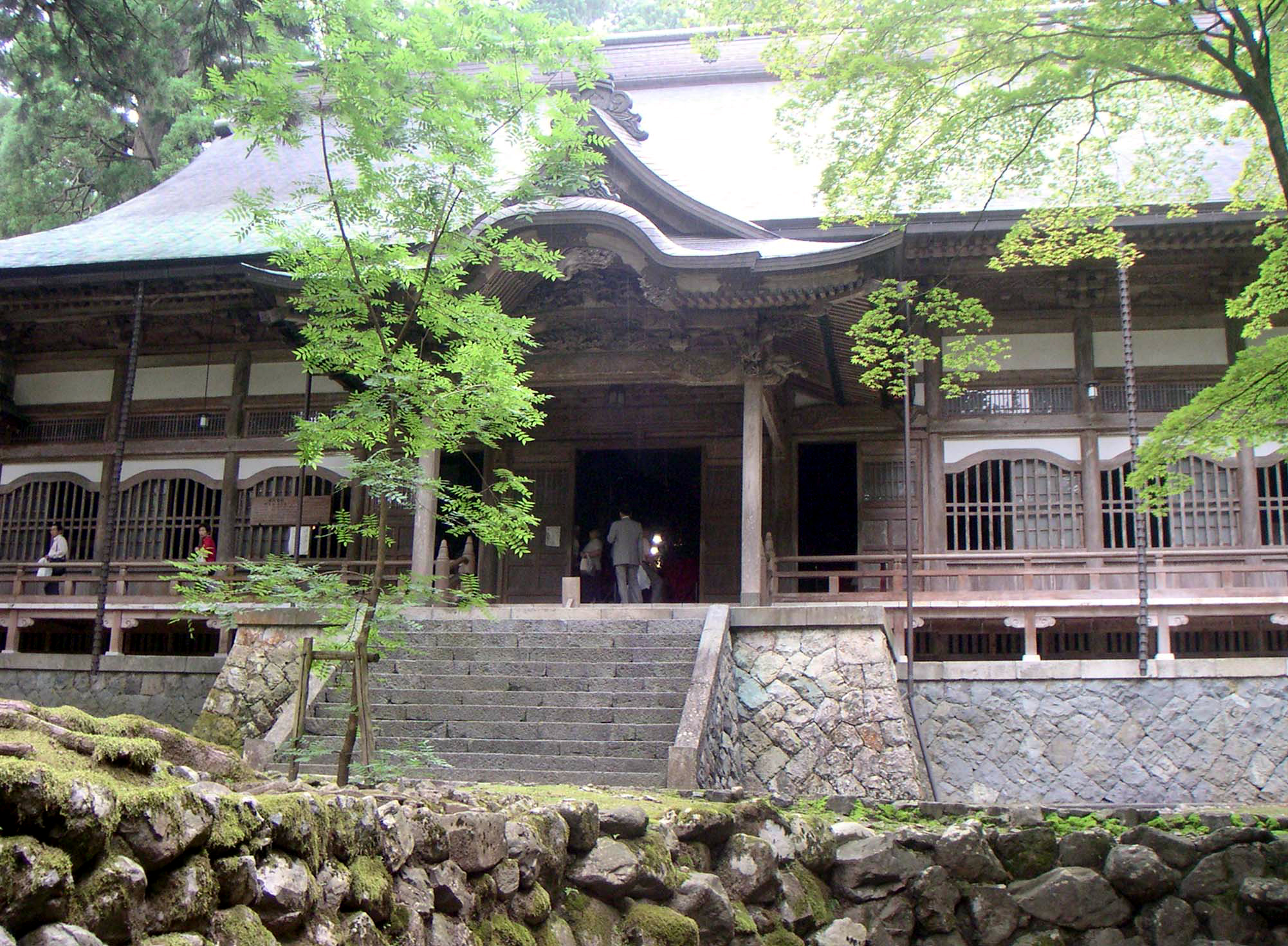
Shidoden (Memorial Hall)

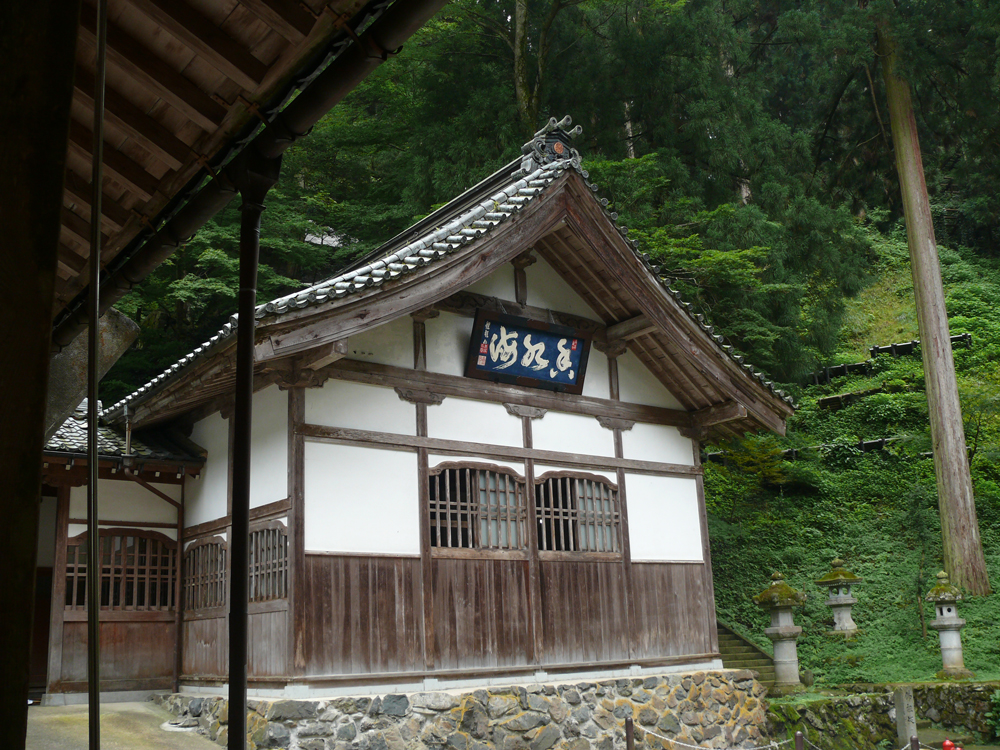
Yokushitsu (bath)

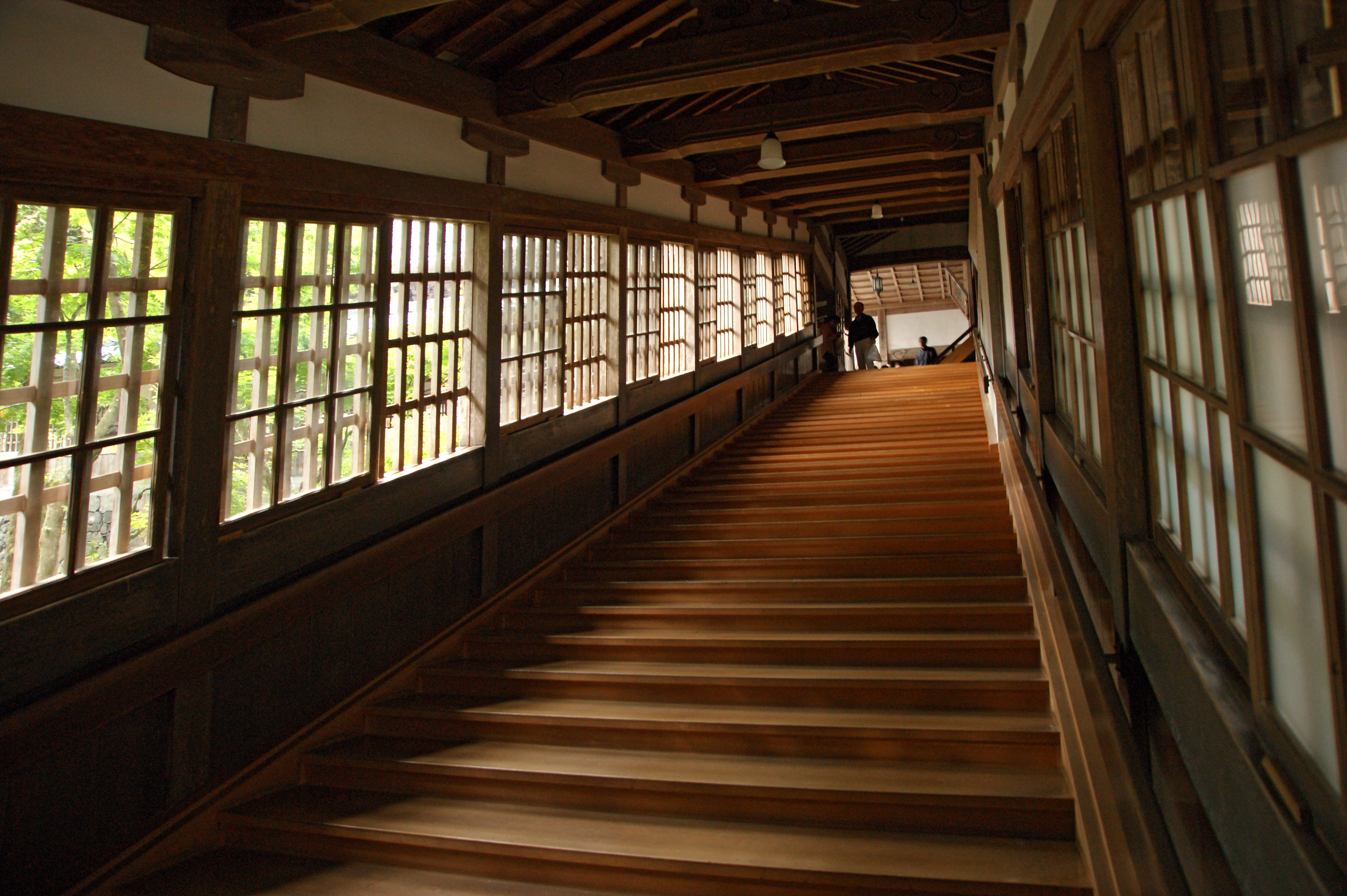
One of the covered corridors

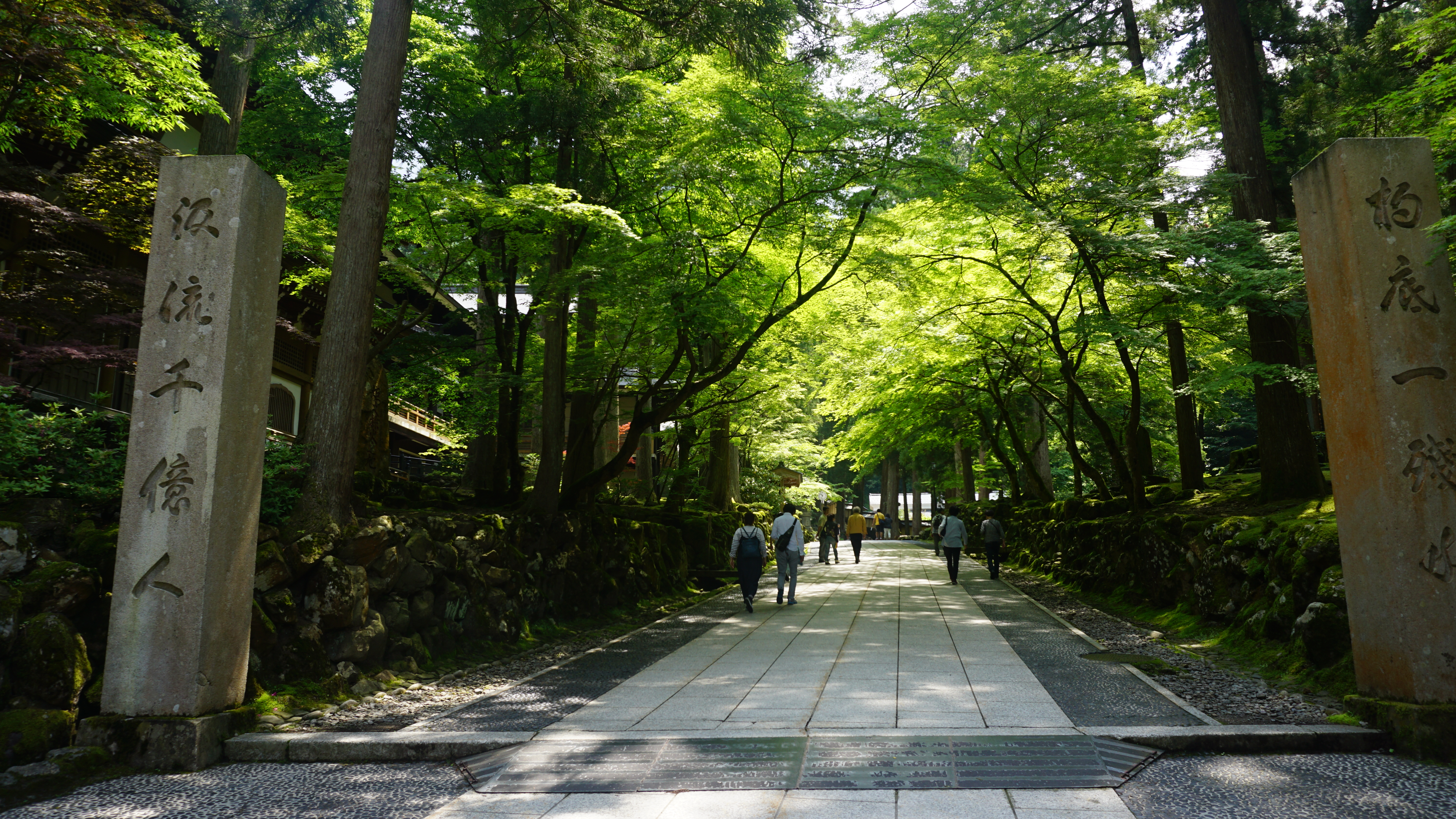
The main entrance

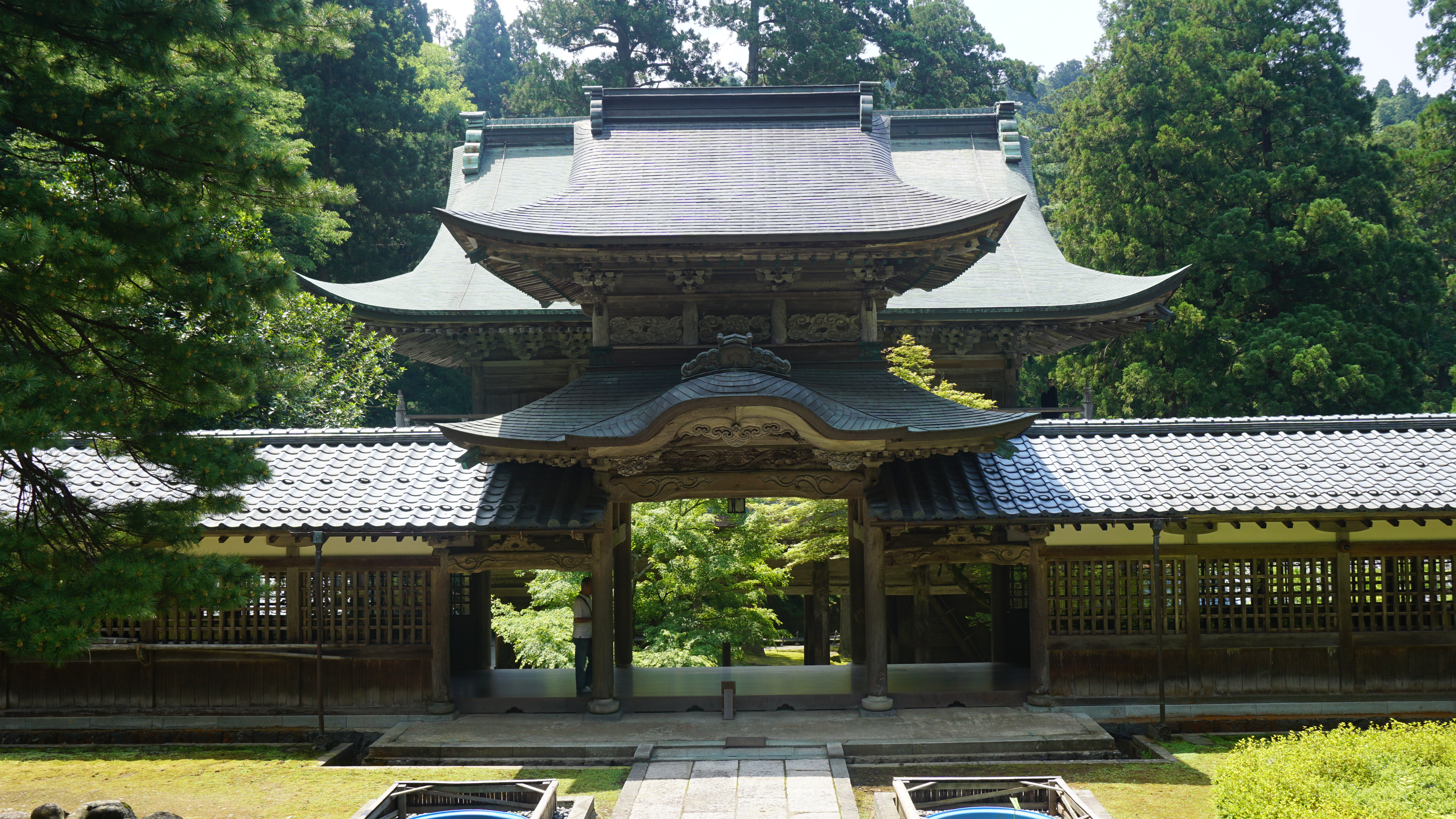
Sakamon Gate

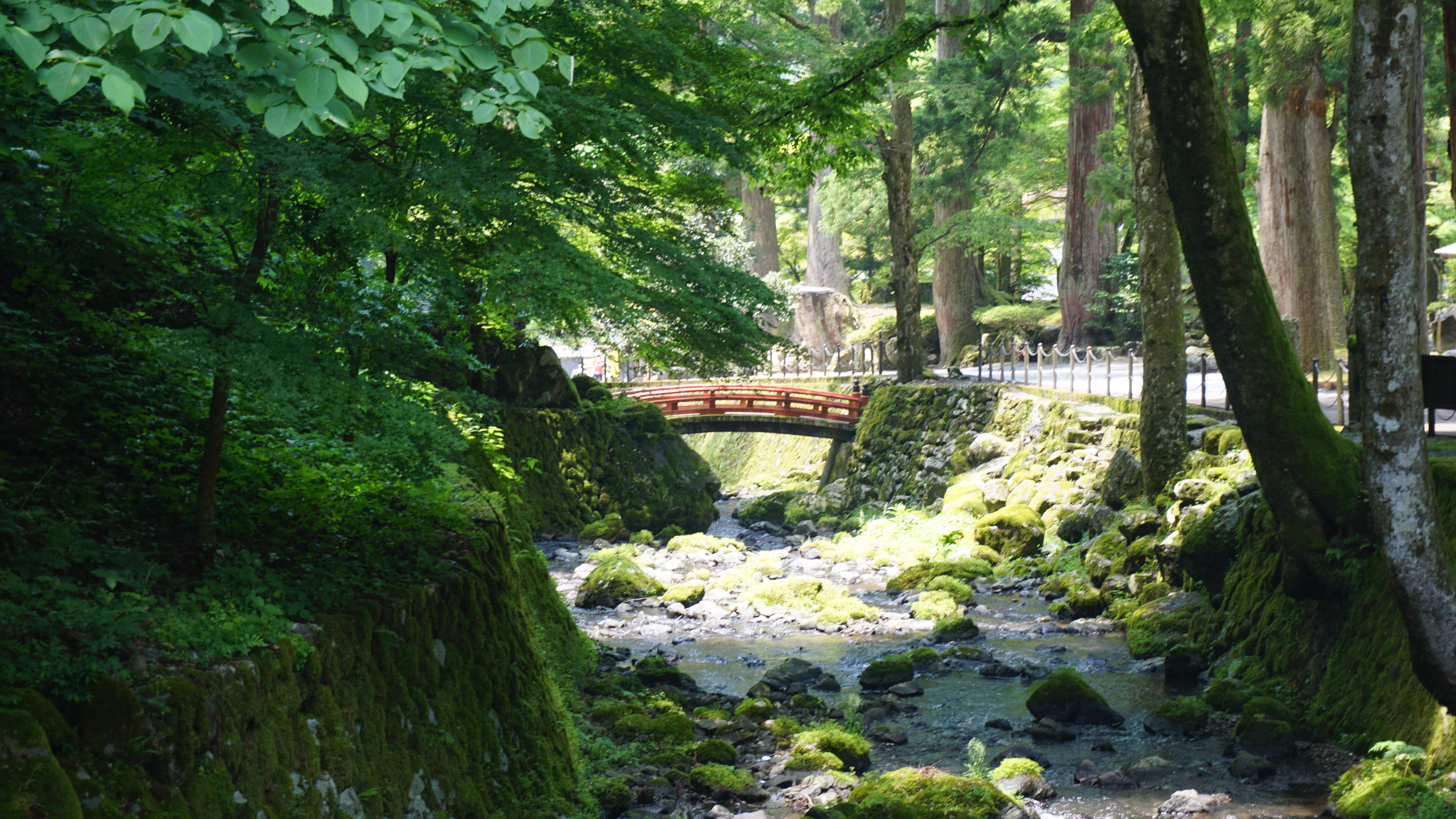
A stream flowing beside Eiheiji

== Cultural Properties ==
=== National Treasure ===
- Scroll: Fukan zazengi (普勸坐禪儀), Kamakura period (1233) .

=== National Important Cultural Properties ===
Structures

- Butsuden (仏殿), Meiji period (1902).
- Hattō (仏殿), late Edo period (1842). The Lecture Hall houses a statue of Sho-kannon (Avalokitesvara) from the Heian period as its principal image.
- Sanmon (山門), mid Edo period (1747). This multi-story gate houses statues of Shaka Nyorai and the Five Hundred Arhats on its upper floors. It is the oldest building in Eihei-ji.
- Chūjyaku-mon (中雀門), late Edo period (1852).
- Sōdō (僧堂), Meiji period (1901). This building houses monks sleeping on tatami mats in the inner hall of the monks' hall and practicing zazen and eating in the outer hall.
- Daiku-in (大庫院), Showa period (1929). This modern wooden building has three floors above ground and one below ground, and serves as a kitchen and office. The original elevator still exists, and is said to be one of the oldest still functioning elevators in Japan.
- Daikōmyō-zō (大光明蔵), Showa period (1929).
- Kaninryō (監院寮), Showa period (1929).
- Kairō (廻廊), Showa period; five structures (1930).
- Jyōyō-in Honden and Haiden (承陽殿本殿及び拝殿), Meiji period (1881).
- Jyōyō-mon (承陽門), Meiji period (1881).
- Kyōzō (経蔵), late Edo period (1851).
- Matsudaira clan cemetery gate (松平家廟所門), early Edo period (1647).
- Shari-den and Worship Hall (舎利殿及び祠堂殿), Showa period (1926).
- Chokushimon (勅使門), late Edo period (1844).

Other

- Bonshō (銅鐘), Kamakura period (1327) .
- Scroll: Calligraphy of the Emperor Gaozu's Successors, ink on paper (紙本墨書高祖嗣書), South Sung Dynasty (1227) .
- Scroll: Ming Quan Precepts, ink on paper with gold and silver illustrations (金銀絵料紙墨書明全戒牒), Kamakura period (1199) .
- Scroll: Shōbōgenzō, Volume 3, ink on paper (金銀絵料紙墨書明全戒牒), Kamakura period (1243) .
- Scroll: Calligraphy of Go-En'yu-in, ink on paper (紙本墨書後円融院宸翰), Nanboku-chō period .

== Branches ==
Japan

- Chōkoku-ji (長谷寺), also known as the Eihei-ji Tokyo Betsuin (永平寺東京別院), in Tokyo.
- Chuō-ji (中央寺), also known as the Eihei-ji Sapporo Betsuin (永平寺札幌別院), in Sapporo.
- Taianden-gokoku-in (泰安殿護国院), also known as the Eihei-ji Nagoya Betsuin (永平寺名古屋別院), in Nagoya.
- Shōryū-ji (紹隆寺), also known as the Eihei-ji Kagoshima Shutchōjo (永平寺鹿児島出張所), in Kagoshima.

United States

- Zenshuji Soto Mission

== See also ==
- List of National Treasures of Japan (writings)
- Japanese Buddhist architecture
