= Kōshō-ji (Uji) =

Buddhist temple in Kyoto Prefecture, Japan

Kōshō-ji 興聖寺
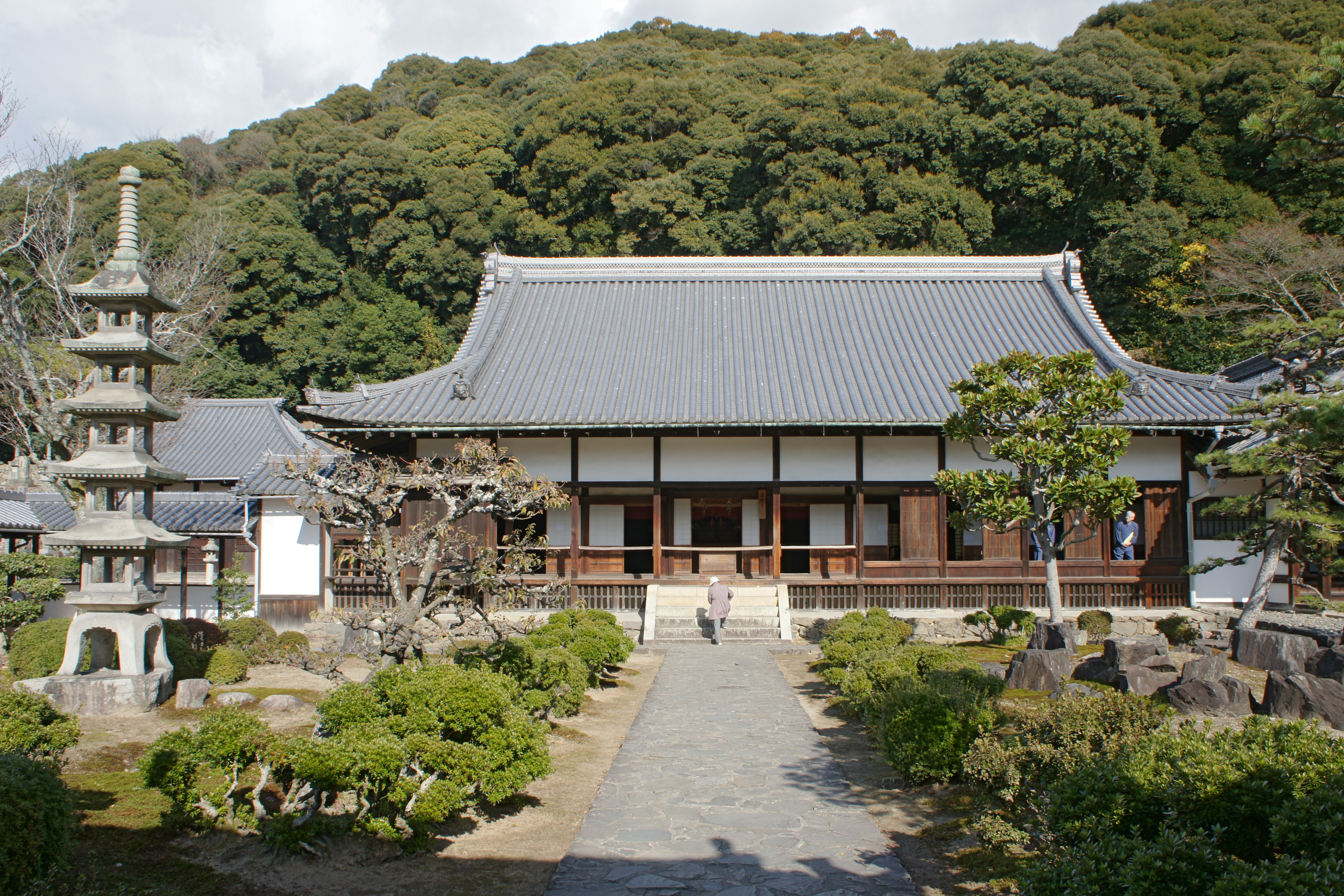
- Main Hall

Religion
- Affiliation: Sōtō Zen
- Deity: Shaka Sanzon (Śākyamuni triad)

Location
- Location: 27 Ujiyamada, Uji, Kyoto Prefecture
- Country: Japan
- Interactive map of Kōshō-ji 興聖寺
- Coordinates: 34°53′24.1″N 135°48′49.45″E

Architecture
- Completed: 1649

Kōshō-ji (Japanese: 興聖寺) is a Sōtō Zen in temple in Japan. It bears an abbreviated form of the name of the temple established by Eihei Dōgen in Kyoto, Kōshōhōrin-ji, but it was established four centuries after that temple was destroyed, and in a different location.
