= Jakuen =

Chinese Zen Buddhist monk

Chinese name
- Chinese: 寂圓
Transcriptions
Standard Mandarin
- Hanyu Pinyin: Jìyuán
Wu
- Wugniu: ziq^{8} yoe^{2}
Yue: Cantonese
- Jyutping: zik^{6} jyun^{4}

Japanese name
- Shinjitai: 寂円
Transcriptions
- Romanization: Jakuen

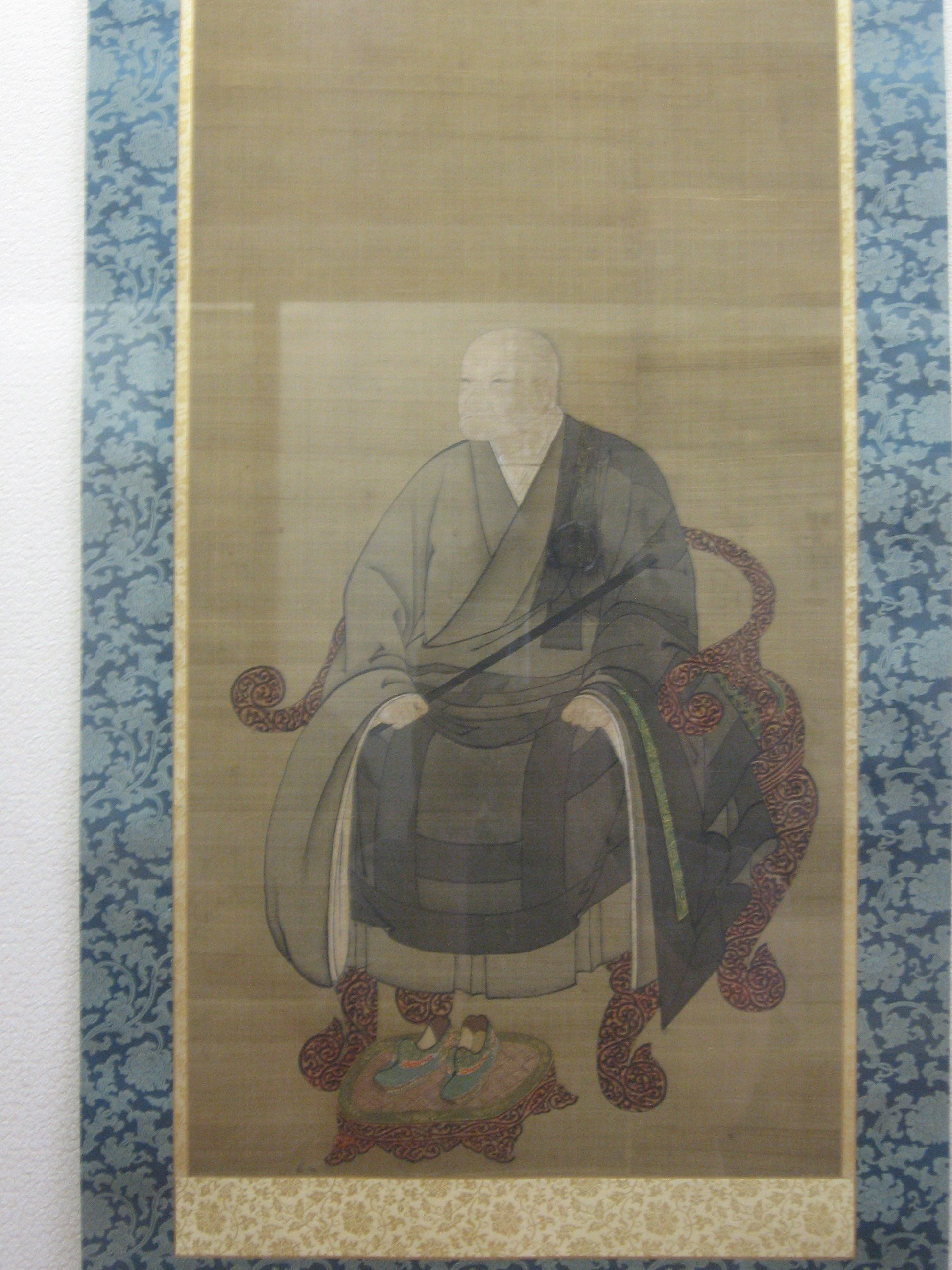

Jiyuan (1207 – 8 October 1299), better known to Buddhist scholars by his Japanese name Jakuen, was a Chinese Zen Buddhist monk and a disciple of Rujing. Most of his life is known to us only through medieval hagiography, legends, and sectarian works. It is generally agreed, though, that during his time at Tiantong Mountain (Chinese: 天童山) he befriended Dōgen who was also studying under Rujing. After Rujing's death in 1228, Jakuen immigrated to Japan in order to join his friend's emerging Sōtō school, but did not receive dharma transmission from Dōgen directly, rather his disciple Koun Ejō.

Jakuen outlived Dōgen and became embroiled in the sandai sōron, a dispute over orthodoxy and succession. In 1261 he left Eihei-ji, leaving the other monks to resolve the power struggle amongst themselves, but allegedly taking with him many treasures of Eihei-ji entrusted to him by Dōgen. He arrived on a remote mountain in Fukui prefecture, where he became famous to the locals for his ascetic meditation on a mountainside without the benefit of any monastic community. During this time, according to medieval legend, he gained the friendship of a cow and dog who would follow him into town during almsrounds. The rock that he sat on has also become a local landmark. Eventually he built a monastery called Hōkyō-ji (Japanese: 宝慶寺) in the style of Tiāntóng, which today owns the only surviving early treasures of Eihei-ji, and serves as a training center for Japanese and international Sōtō Zen Buddhists.

In medieval Japan Jakuen's monastic community split into two separate lineages, one at Hōkyō-ji and one at Eihei-ji which was responsible for some of the corruption that went on there.

Today, there are communities of monks in both China and Japan who claim descent from Jakuen. His disciple Giun became abbot of Eihei-ji. In Japan, there is a temple in Tokyo named Jakuen-ji. Hōkyō-ji is officially in communion with the official Sōtō lineage through Keizan, but unofficially consider Jakuen their patriarch.
