= Jisho Warner =

American buddhist priest

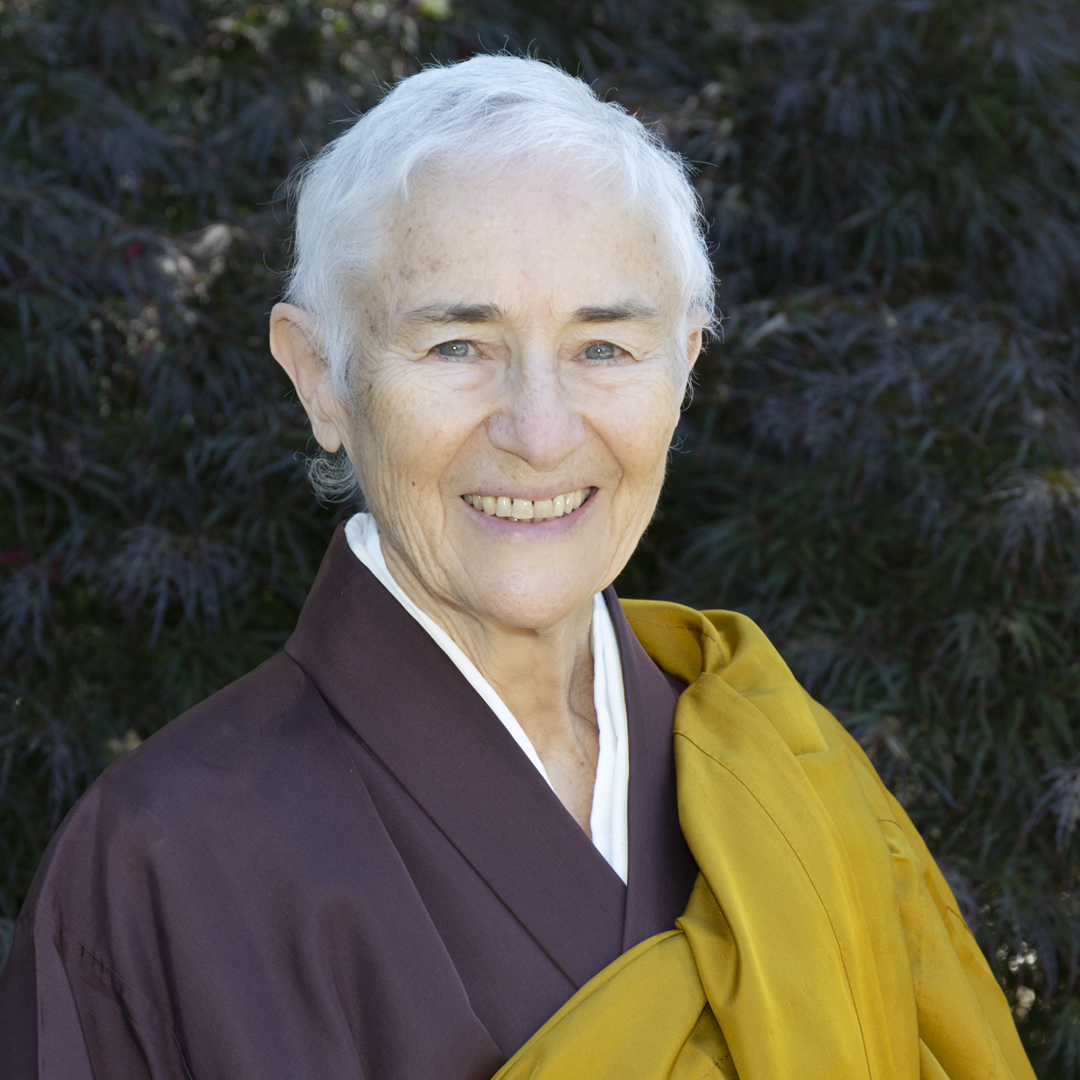

Personal life
- Spouse: Elska Joan Lennox
- Education: Harvard University

Religious life
- Religion: Buddhism
- School: Sōtō

Senior posting
- Teacher: Tozen Akiyama; Dainin Katagiri; Shundo Aoyama_Rōshi; Koshi Ichida
- Based in: Stone Creek Zen Center
- Predecessor: Tozen Akiyama
- Website: stonecreekzen.org

Jisho Warner is a Sōtō Zen priest and abiding teacher of Stone Creek Zen Center in Sonoma County, California. Warner is a former president of the Soto Zen Buddhist Association, and its first female and first LGBTQ president. Having graduated from Harvard University in 1965, she became an artist and freelance editor. She has edited books by Robert Thurman, Ed Brown, Wendy Johnson, Jane Hirshfield, Dainin Katagiri, and many others. She is a co-editor of the book Opening the Hand of Thought by Kosho Uchiyama, whose teachings she first encountered in the 1980s while practicing at the Pioneer Valley Zendo in Massachusetts under Koshi Ichida.

She has contributed to a number of books, including Receiving the Marrow (a collection of essays on Dogen Zenji), Nothing is Hidden, The Hidden Lamp, Being Bodies, The Beginner’s Guide to Zen Buddhism, and 365 Zen.

Warner trained in both the United States and in Japan. She was a longtime student of Dainin Katagiri, who was by then the head of the Minnesota Zen Meditation Center, and trained under him at Hokyoji, a residential center in Minnesota. She completed the certification training required by the Sotoshu at Aichi Senmon Nisodo, a monastery in Nagoya, Japan, where she studied under Shundō Aoyama Rōshi. She trained finally under Tozen Akiyama at the Milwaukee Zen Center, was ordained by him, and received shiho, dharma transmission, from him in 1995.

Warner founded Stone Creek Zen Center in 1996 and has continued to teach there since then. In 2022 Zen teacher Sessei Meg Levie joined her in leading the growing sangha community, as part of a successful generational succession of temple leadership, following an eight-year tenure of Korin Charlie Pokorny and Dojin Sarah Emerson. Stone Creek re-opened in January 2023, following a major renovation and expansion of the center, located in Graton, California.

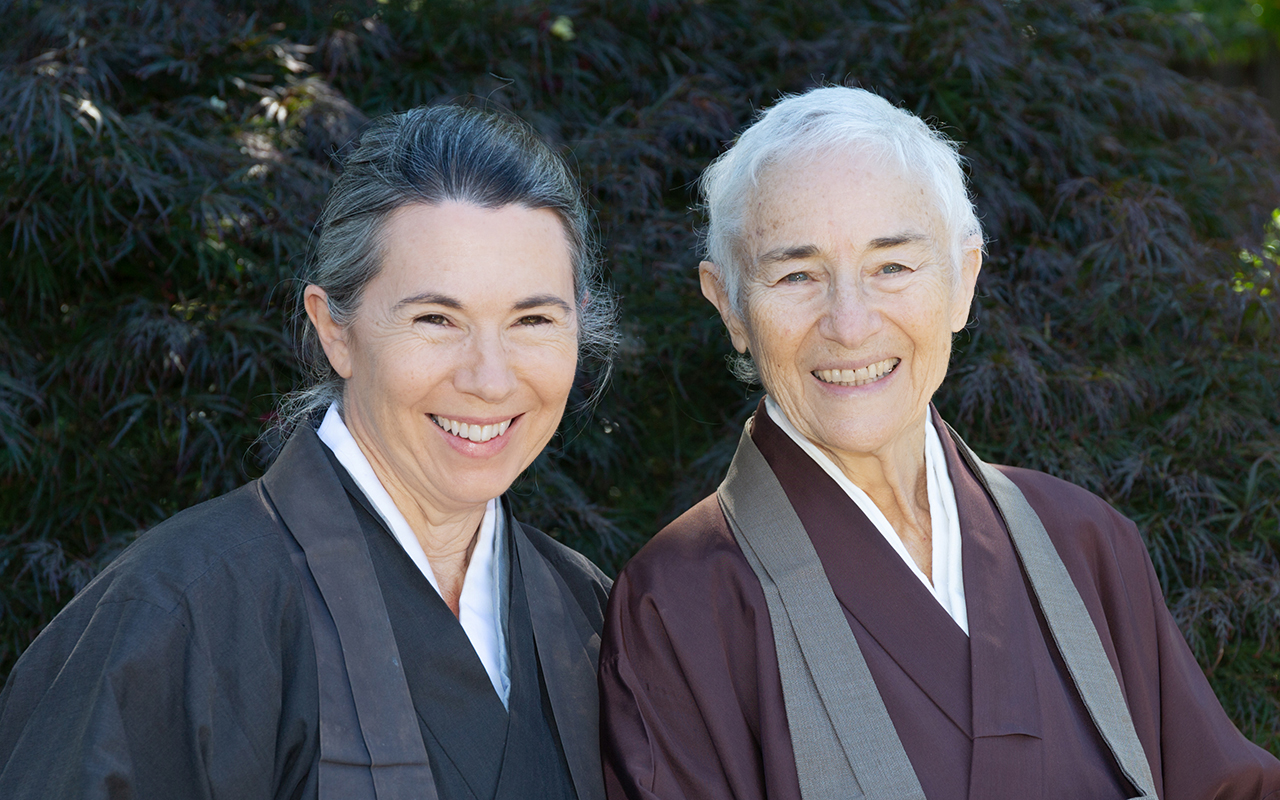
Teachers Meg Levie and Jisho Warner

Warner has given dharma transmission to four successors: the late Joko Dave Haselwood, who had earlier been a notable publisher of Beat and San Francisco Renaissance poets in the 1960s as founder of Auerhahn Press; Toan Irene Flynn, who teaches Zen in St. Augustine, Florida; and two adjunct teachers at Stone Creek, Annette Joay Lille, a retired hospice chaplain, and Myozen Barton Stone.

== Bibliography ==
- Warner, Jisho Cary; Shohaku Okumura; Taigen Dan Leighton; John McRae (2001). Nothing Is Hidden : Essays on Zen Master Dogen's Instructions for the Cook. Weatherhill. ISBN 0-8348-0478-6. OCLC 45488199.
- Uchiyama, Kosho; Warner, Jisho Cary; Okumura, Shohaku; Tom Wright (1993). Opening the Hand of Thought: Approach to Zen. Arkana. ISBN 0-14-019459-2.
- Eido Frances Carney, ed. Receiving the Marrow: Teachings on Dogen by Soto Zen Women Priests. Temple Ground. ISBN 0985565101.
- Florence Caplow and Susan Moon, eds. The Hidden Lamp: Stories from Twenty-five Centuries of Awakened Women. Wisdom. ISBN 978-0-86171-659-3.

== See also ==
- Buddhism in the United States
- Timeline of Zen Buddhism in the United States
