= Dharma Field Zen Center =

Zen Buddhist centre in Minneapolis, Minnesota

Dharma Field
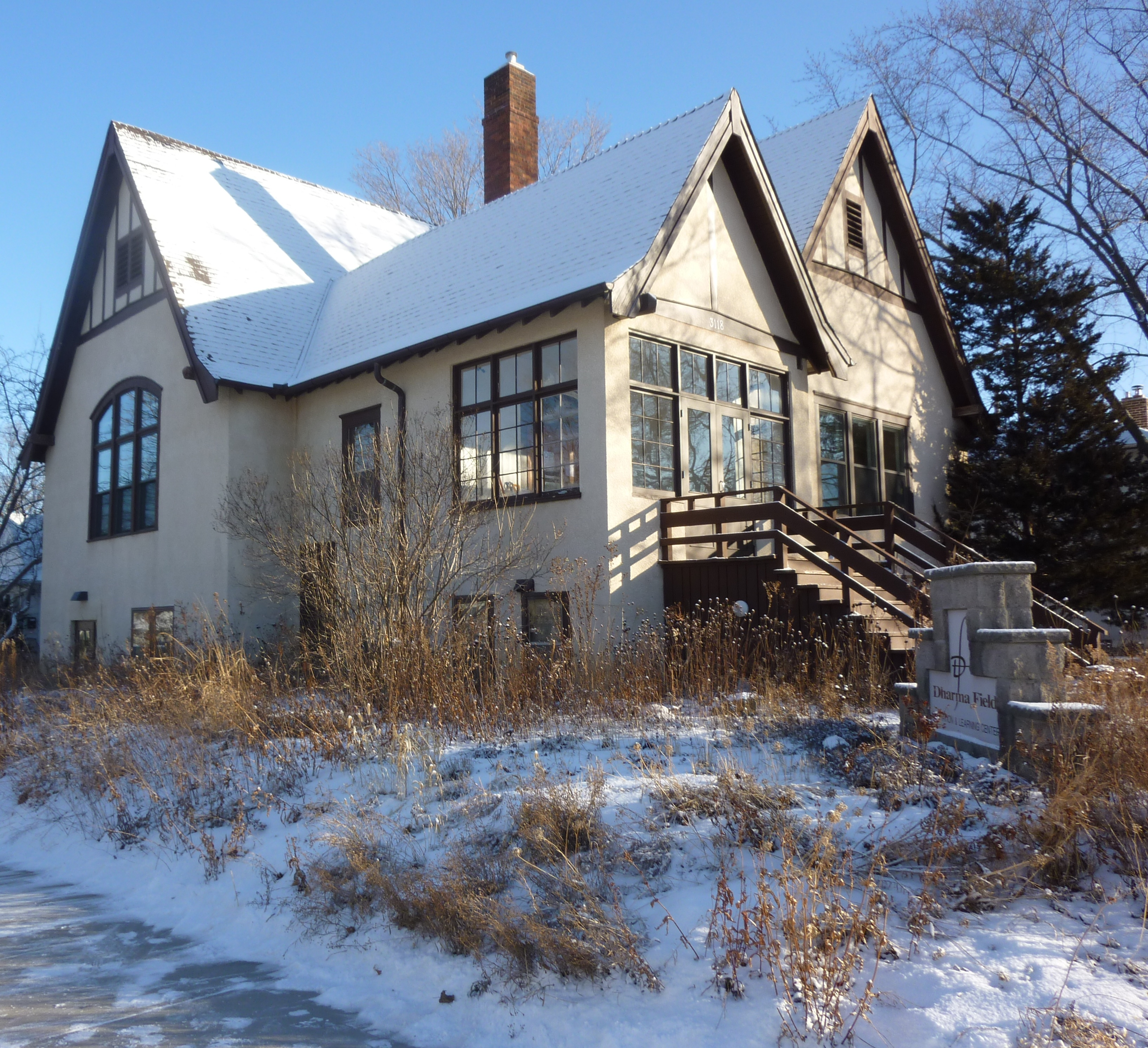
- Native plants are used for water management

Religion
- Affiliation: Sōtō Zen Buddhism

Location
- Location: 3118 West 49th Street Minneapolis, Minnesota 55410 (West 49th St & York Ave S)
- Country: United States

Architecture
- Founder: Steve Hagen
- Completed: 1997

Website
- http://www.dharmafield.org/

Dharma Field Zen Center (Dharma Field Meditation and Learning Center) is a Zen Buddhist community that offers daily meditation, sesshins, Sunday morning Dharma talks, and a large web archive.

A multi-year curriculum explores the foundation studies of Buddha, Nagarjuna, Dōgen, and the wisdom teachings of the Mahayana.

Head teacher Steve Hagen and Dharma teacher Norm Randolph are Dharma heirs of Dainin Katagiri. Former head teacher Bev Forsman and former Dharma teacher Lee Register are Dharma heirs of Steve Hagen.

Dharma Field is located in the former St. Andrew's Lutheran Church in Minneapolis, Minnesota.

== Gallery ==
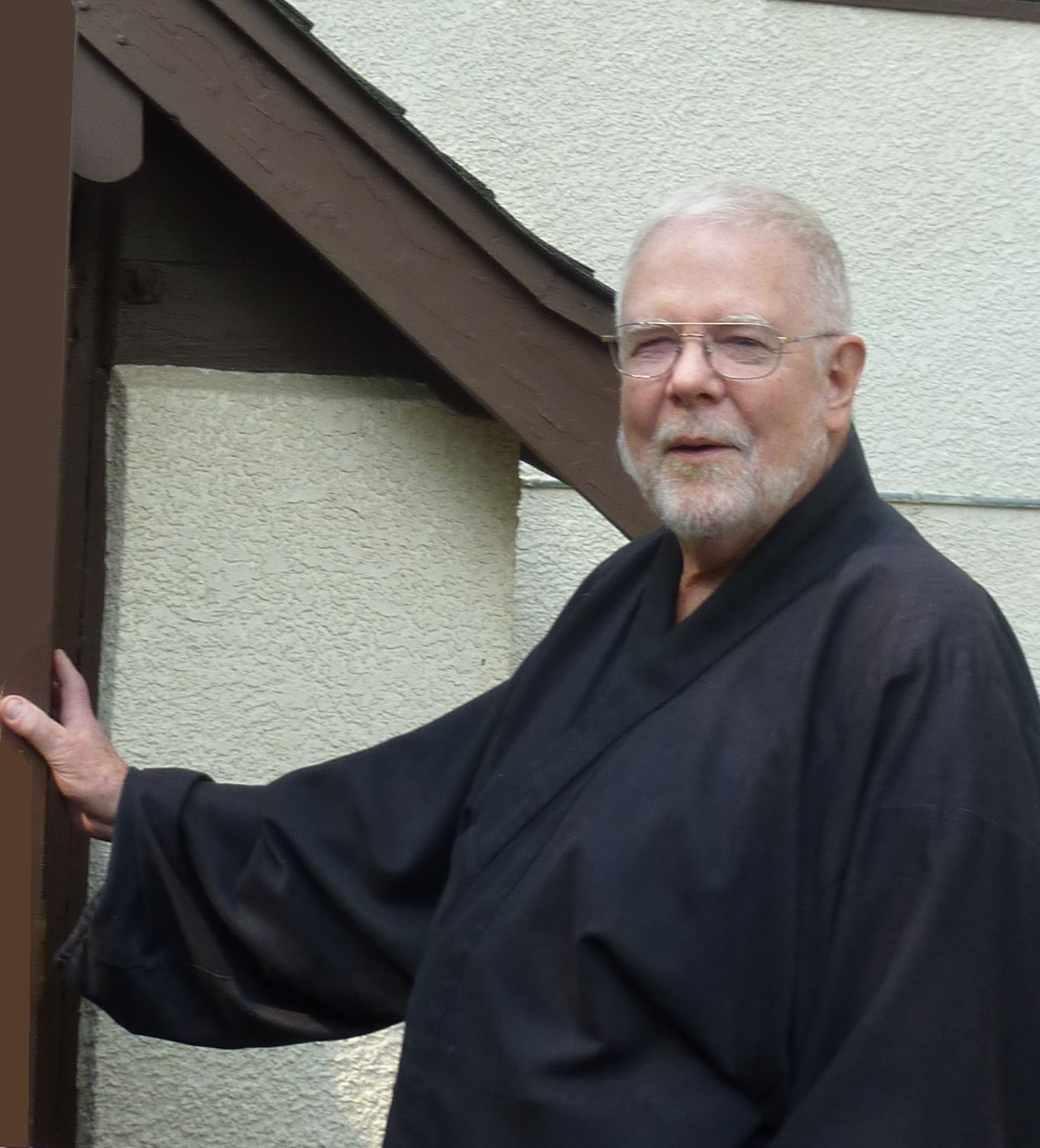
Norm Randolph in 2012

== See also ==
- Buddhism in the United States
