= Nonin Chowaney =

American Soto Zen priest and brush calligrapher (died 2022)

Rev. Nonin Chowaney
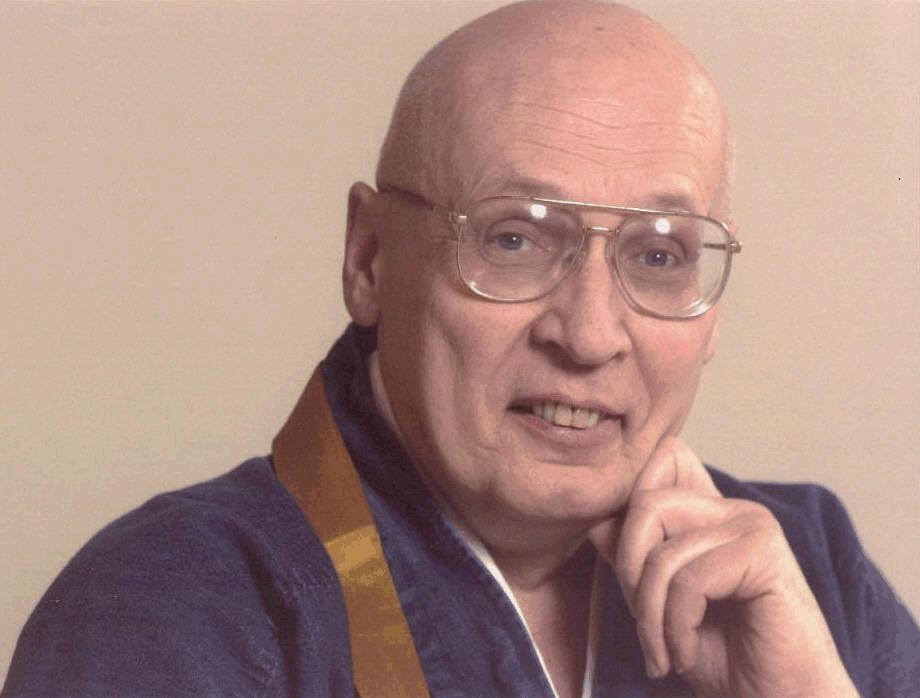

Religious life
- Religion: Buddhism
- School: Sōtō

Nonin Chowaney (OPW) (died July 29, 2022) was an American Soto Zen priest and brush calligrapher. A dharma heir of the late Dainin Katagiri-roshi, Chowaney received dharma transmission in 1989 and was the founder of an organization of Soto priests known as the Order of the Prairie Wind (OPW), which is now defunct.

Chowaney was longtime abbot of the Nebraska Zen Center in Omaha. In 1999, Chowaney founded the Zen Center of Pittsburgh - Deep Spring Temple in Bell Acres, Pennsylvania, and appointed Kyōki Roberts as the head priest. Then in 2001 he gave dharma transmission to Roberts, his only ordained student.

== See also ==
- Buddhism in the United States
- Timeline of Zen Buddhism in the United States
