= Paula Arai =

Professor

- Occupations: Professor, Buddhist studies scholar

Academic background
- Education: Kalamazoo College, B.A.; Harvard Divinity School, MTS; Harvard University, M.A. and Ph.D.

Academic work
- Discipline: Buddhist Studies, Japanese laywomen and Sōtō Zen nuns, Japanese Buddhist aesthetics
- Institutions: Louisiana State University; Institute of Buddhist Studies, Berkeley, California
- Notable works: Women Living Zen: Japanese Sōtō Buddhist Nuns (1999); Bringing Zen Home: The Healing Heart of Japanese Women's Rituals (2011); Painting Enlightenment: Healing Visions of the Heart Sutra (2019); Oxford Handbook of Buddhist Practice (co-editor with Kevin Trainor) (2022); The Little Book of Zen Healing: Japanese Rituals for Beauty, Harmony, and Love (2023).
- Website: https://www.zenhealing.org/

Paula Kane Robinson Arai is an American professor and Buddhist studies scholar, specializing in the academic study of women and Buddhism, specifically Jōdo Shinshū Buddhism and Japanese Sōtō Zen women. She has also been an active public speaker and led workshops on healing rituals.

Arai, who grew up in Detroit, Michigan, earned her Ph.D. in comparative religion and Japanese Buddhism from Harvard University. While still a student, she began conducting ethnographic and historical research about Japanese Zen nuns, which eventually became her first book, Women Living Zen: Japanese Soto Buddhist Nuns (1999). She taught courses in Buddhism, Asian religions, and theories of religion at Louisiana State University and is currently a member of the faculty at the Institute of Buddhist Studies in Berkeley, California. She is a practitioner of the religious traditions she studies; her work is grounded in ethnographic research and her pedagogical approach "blends a rigorous academic background with a compassionate, embodied, and person-centered approach to teaching". She has been awarded several research grants and teaching honors.

Arai has written four additional books, as well as a long list of journal articles. She published Bringing Zen Home: The Healing Heart of Japanese Women's Rituals in 2011, in which she studied, the religious and spiritual practices of 12 lay women, whom she called her "consociates", ranging from their 40s to their 70s. in 2019, Arai published Painting Enlightenment: Healing Visions of the Heart Sutra—The Buddhist Art of Iwasaki Tsuneo, which studies and analyzes the work of Iwasaki Tsuneo (1917-2002), a Japanese biologist and Buddhist artist. in 2022, she co-edited the Oxford Handbook of Buddhist Practice, and in 2023, she published The Little Book of Zen Healing.

== Early life and education ==
Paula Arai grew up in Detroit, Michigan, the daughter of Lucian Ford Robinson, who was Euro-American, and Masuko Arai Robinson, who was Japanese. Arai's father fought in World War II; her parents met during the U.S. occupation of Japan and "were committed to healing after World War II". Her biographer, Karma Lekshe Tsomo, states that Arai "learned to code-switch at home, toggling between the language and perspectives of her Japanese mother...and the North American cultural norms and expectations of her Anglo father". Arai's mother did not self-identify as a Buddhist; the family attended her husband's Methodist church services and their children were baptized in the Methodist Church. Arai's mother, however, conveyed her Japanese worldview and Buddhist values to her children and as a result, Arai "internalized her mother's Japanese Buddhist sensibility". (Note: As of 2020, Arai was writing a book about her mother, entitled Samurai Daughter, Indentured Geisha, American Mother: An Odyssey from Buddhist Japan to Christian America.) Her father valued education, so he supported his daughter's schooling.

Arai earned a bachelor's degree with honors in music and religion from Kalamazoo College in 1983, a Master of Theological Studies from Harvard Divinity School in 1985, a master's degree in the history of religions from Harvard in 1987, a master's degree in Buddhist Studies from Harvard in 1987, and a Ph.D. in comparative religion and Japanese Buddhism also from Harvard in 1993. She studied abroad at Waseda University in Tokyo from 1980 to 1983. While in her Ph.D. program, she was awarded a Fulbright scholarship in support of her dissertation, which included ethnographic and historical research about Japanese Zen nuns. She also received a Edwin O. Reischaeur Institute Grant and a Lilly Foundation Grant that allowed her to study Asian American Christians.

In 1997, Arai served as a translator for Antioch University's Buddhist Studies program, a semester-long undergraduate study abroad program, in Bodh Gaya, India. While in India, she was introduced to the writings of Aoyama Rōshi, the abbess of Aichi Senmon Nisōdō, a monastic training center for Sōtō Zen nuns in Nagoya, Japan. Tsomo called her experience in Bodh Gayā "a pivotal moment in Arai's life". and that it "set into motion a research trajectory that became the centerpiece of her early academic career". Arai was inspired to study the nuns' lives at Aichi Senmon Nisōdō while "embedding herself in the life of the monastery" for four months in the fall of 1989, which became her first book, Women Living Zen: Japanese Soto Buddhist Nuns, published in 1999. Her study was based upon interviews with nuns, surveys of laypeople and nuns, and historical materials, such as publications written for and by nuns. As Suzanne Mrozik states in her review of Women Living Zen in the Journal of Religion, Arai's analysis "centers on the efforts of twentieth-century Soto nuns to create a female monastic tradition that accords with their interpretations of Soto Zen teachings on monasticism and equality".

Arai was influenced by Martin Luther King Jr.; J. Mark Thompson, her professor and a specialist in comparative religion; her mentor John Bunyan Spencer, who introduced her to the philosophy of Alfred North Whitehead; Wilfred Cantwell Smith; James Luther Adams; and Masatoshi Nagatomi, Harvard's first full-time professor of Buddhist Studies. She later reported that the mixed and negatives messages she received during her doctoral education about the validity of a Japanese American woman specializing in the lives and religious practices of Japanese Buddhist women "prepared her to overcome obstacles in order to make the contributions she was poised to make".

When Arai was still a student, she was able to see that women's emotional, spiritual, and intellectual lives were connected, and she wanted to study how, even while pursuing her academic studies. She proposed researching Zen nuns in Japan, but her academic advisors considered it unworthy of study and stalled her dissertation and studies because they did not consider ethnographic studies rational. At Harvard, not only was the topic radical for her time, so was her intention to embed herself into her subjects' lives. The educational establishment resisted Arai's research because they considered it too emotional and Arai experienced professional discrimination as a result, but she pursued her studies and research, anyway. As Tsomo states, "Her vulnerability and honesty about her personal perspective and experience became an asset in her research". (Note: See Tsomo, pp. 196-201, for a discussion of Arai's ethnographic methodology.)

== Career ==
In 1993, Arai taught and did research at Hong Kong University of Science and Technology, where she studied Hong Kong culture at the end of the colonial era and conducted field research in Japan. She was able to defer a tenure-track position at Vanderbilt University, where she worked from 1994 to 2002, while caring for her infant son as a single parent and providing end-of-life care for her mother. She conducted field work while raising her young son, which although was challenging, helped deepen her relationships with the lay women she studied. Tsomo states that although Arai's life experiences at this time were not a part of her formal research, "these natural yet intense life experiences launched her into the theme of healing, which became the basis for her subsequent work". Arai later told Tsomo that she experienced untenable working environments for women, especially for women of color, including reviews of 75 percent of the courses she taught and as Tsomo put it, "as is quite common in the academy, she watched male candidates with fewer awards and achievements sail through the tenure process, only to see her own tenure process aborted".

In 2002, she joined the faculty at Carleton College, where she was awarded a Carleton College Targeted Opportunity Grant in 2003, an American Academy of Religion Research Assistance Grant in 2004, and a Mellon Faculty Fellowship in 2005. In 2007, she began a position at Louisiana State University (LSU), where she was awarded the Urmila Gopal Singhal Professorship in 2018; became full professor in 2020; and won two Manship Summer Research Fellowships in 2020 and 2021 and other teaching awards. At LSU, she served as the section head for their Religious Studies department from 2010 to 2013 and was a member of the faculties of Asian Studies and Women's and Gender Studies. She also taught courses in Buddhism, Asian religions, and theories of religion. In 2023, Arai joined the faculty at the Institute of Buddhist Studies in Berkeley, California, as the inaugural Eshinni and Kakushinni Professor of Women and Buddhist Studies, which supports an Institute professor specializing in the academic study of women and Buddhism, specifically Jōdo Shinshū Buddhism. The Institute of Buddhist Studies called Arai's appointment "an historic moment for the empowerment of women committed to the Dharma". She has taught at the San Francisco Zen Center and the Upaya Zen Center in Santa Fe, New Mexico. She was also an active public speaker and led workshops on healing rituals.

Arai was a practitioner of the religion traditions she studied. Tsomo states that Arai's pedagogical approach to teaching "draws heavily on ethnographic methods she developed for her research, where self-reflexive interaction drives the interchange". Arai's faculty page on the Institute of Buddhist Studies webpage, which calls her a specialist in Japanese Sōtō Zen women, states that her work is "grounded in ethnographic research" and that she "engages in immersive poetic storytelling as a medium for conveying the experiential dimension of Buddhist practices and teachings". The institute also stated, when they announced her position there, that Arai "blends a rigorous academic background with a compassionate, embodied, and person-centered approach to teaching".

== Writings and research ==
Arai's first book, Women Living Zen (1999), expanded the scope of Zen studies by advancing critical interpretations of female monastic practices and by describing ethnographic data on Sōtō Zen nuns in Japan. According to Arai's faculty page on the LSU website, the book "changes the face of Zen scholarship with the restoration of women to historical accounts and a reassessment of religious practice and institutional patterns in light of prevailing gender relationships". Anna Grimshaw, in her review of Women Living Zen, states that while describing female monasticism, Arai resists "the androcentrism of much Buddhist scholarship". Reviewer Suzanne Mrozik calls the book "a fine study" and "an insightful and engaging study of Japanese Sōtō Zen nuns".

In Arai's second book, Bringing Zen Home: The Healing Heart of Japanese Women's Rituals (2011), expanded the scope of Zen studies, she studied, beginning in 1998 and lasting for over 10 years, the religious and spiritual practices of 12 lay women, ranging in age from their 40s to their 70s. The women, who were "strongly affected by World War II", followed a variety of Japanese Buddhism sects. She called her subjects, whose narratives made up her study's ethnographic foundation, "consociates"; she created close ties with each of them by disclosing details of her own life and experiences surrounding the death of her mother and considered them as partners in her work. Arai found that Buddhist rituals help relieve fears, remind practitioners of impermanence, provide opportunities for healing, and help people cope with their loss and grief. Using older communication styles of the Japanese language taught to her by her mother, Arai gained the trust of the older women she studied, focusing on the ritual practices they used in their homes. As Tsomo states, Arai took a professional risk in conducting her research in this way, but it was successful because it unmasked "the colonial penchant in religious studies". According to the Institute of Buddhist Studies, Arai maintained decades-long relationships with the women she studied. Another contribution Arai makes in Bringing Zen Home is "her discerning awareness of how Buddhist philosophy becomes a source of personal healing".

in 2019, Arai published Painting Enlightenment: Healing Visions of the Heart Sutra—The Buddhist Art of Iwasaki Tsuneo; Tsomo conducted exhibitions at museums, universities, and conferences featuring the work of Iwasaki Tsuneo (1917-2002), a Japanese biologist and Buddhist artist. Tsomo states that Arai's work surrounding Tsuneo, which Tsomo calls Arai's "radical foray into Japanese Buddhist aesthetics", was her "most liberating scholarly endeavor". The book explores "the healing dynamics of visual scripture in Iwasaki's art" and required ethnographic field research and fluency in written and spoken Japanese because Arai conducted in-depth interviews with Iwaskaki and read primary and secondary materials. Her expertise in Japanese Buddhist culture and Buddhist Madhyamika philosophy enabled her to interpret and contextualize Iwaskaki's art he created with the Heart of Wisdom Sūtra.

In 2022, Arai co-edited, with Kevin Trainor, the Oxford Handbook of Buddhist Practice, a volume featuring 39 scholars from around the world and which emphasizes "embodied experience as an integral aspect of the predominantly text-centered field of Buddhist Studies". In 2023, Arai published The Little Book of Zen Healing, which describes how to maintain meaning despite the challenges of daily life and the use of ritual to heal from grief, cope with intense emotions, and experience "a depth of warm gratitude that melts fear and anger".

== Awards and honors ==
- Hong Kong University of Science & Technology Research Grant (1993—1994)
- Vanderbilt University Research Council Summer Research Grant (1995)
- Vanderbilt University Research Council Direct Research Grant (1995)
- Vanderbilt University Venture Fund Award for Teaching (1995)
- Fulbright Senior Scholar Grant (1998)
- American Council of Learned Societies Fellow (1998)
- Vanderbilt University Research Council Direct Research Grant (1998)
- Vanderbilt University Research Council Direct Research Grant (2000)
- Vanderbilt University Venture Fund Award for Teaching (2000)
- Carleton College Targeted Opportunity Grant (2003)
- American Academy of Religion Research Assistance Grant (2004)
- Mellon Faculty Fellowship, Carleton College (2005)
- ATLAS (Awards to Louisiana Artists and Scholars), Louisiana Board of Regents (2008—2009)
- Manship Summer Research Fellowship (2012, 2020)

== Selected publications ==
=== Books ===
- Women Living Zen: Japanese Sōtō Buddhist Nuns (1999). New York: Oxford University Press, via Terebess Online..
- Bringing Zen Home: The Healing Heart of Japanese Women's Rituals (2011). Honolulu, Hawaii: University of Hawaii Press, via Terebess Online.
- Painting Enlightenment: Healing Visions of the Heart Sutra (2019). Boulder, Colorado: Shambhala Publications.
- Oxford Handbook of Buddhist Practice (co-editor with Kevin Trainor) (2022). Oxford, England: Oxford University Press.
- The Little Book of Zen Healing: Japanese Rituals for Beauty, Harmony, and Love (2023). Boulder, Colorado: Shambhala Publications.

=== Articles in academic journals ===
- "Nuns: Japanese Buddhism's Living Treasures". Hikaku Shisō Kenkyū [Studies in Comparative Philosophy] 17 (1990): 189–184.
- "Discovering Sōtō Zen Nuns' Contributions to Japanese Buddhism and Culture". Zen Kenkyūjō Kiyō [Journal of the Institute for Zen Studies] 28 (1999): 246-230.
- "Exploring Strategies for Research on Buddhist Women". Hikaku Shisō Kenkyū [Studies in Comparative Philosophy] 25 (May 1999): 13–23.
- "The Dead As 'Personal Buddhas': Japanese Ancestor Rites as Healing Rites". Pacific World Third Series, 5 (Fall 2003): 3–17.
- "Bowing to the Dharma: Japanese Buddhist Women Leaders and Healers". Religions: Special Issue on Women in Buddhism, 2017.

=== Chapters in edited volumes ===
- "Sōtō Zen Nuns in Modern Japan: Keeping and Creating Tradition". In Mullins, Mark, Shimazono Susumu, and Paul Swanson (eds.). Religion and Society in Modern Japan. Berkeley, California: Asian Humanities Press, 1993. 203–218.
- "Japanese Buddhist Nuns: Innovators for the Sake of Tradition". In Karma Lekshe Tsomo (ed.). Buddhist Women Across Cultures: Realizations. New York: State University of New York Press, 1999, 105–122.
- "A Case of Ritual Zen: Gratitude to Ānanda". In Innovative Buddhist Women: Swimming Against the Stream. In Tsomo, Karma Lekshe (ed.). Richmond, Surrey: Curzon Press, 2000, 123–129.
- "Japanese Buddhist Nuns' Ritual of Gratitude and Empowerment". In Findley, Ellison (ed.). Women's Buddhism, Buddhism's Women: Tradition, Revision, Renewal. Boston, Massachusetts: Wisdom Publications, 2000, 119—130.
- "Medicines, Healing, and Spiritualities: A Cross-Cultural Exploration". In Barnes, L. and I. Talamantez (eds). Teaching Religion and Healing. New York: Oxford University Press, 2006, 207–18.
- "Women and Dōgen: Rituals of Empowerment and Healing". In Heine, Steve and Dale Wright (eds.). Zen Ritual. New York: Oxford University Press, 2007, pp. 185–204.
- "The Zen of Healing: Making Friends with Chronic Illness". In Stotzfus, Michael, Rebecca Green, and Darla Schumm (eds.). Chronic Illness, Spirituality, and Healing: Diverse Disciplinary Cultural Perspectives. New York: Palgrave Macmillan Press, 2013.
- "Healing Zen: The Brain on Bowing". in Vargas-O’Bryan, Ivette and Zhou Xun (eds.). Disease, Religion and Healing in Asia: Collaborations and Collisions. New York: Routledge Publications, 2014, 155–169.
- "Mother Kannon: Womb of Compassion". In Boucher, Sandra (ed.). She Appears: Encounters with Kwan Yin Goddess of Compassion. Las Vegas, Nevada: Goddess Ink, 2015, 87–89.
- "The Zen of Rags" In Heine, Steven and Pamela Winfield, (eds.) Zen and Material Culture. New York: Oxford University Press, 2017, pp. 229–256.
- "Healing Wisdom: An Appreciation of a Japanese Scientist's Paintings of the Heart Sūtra". In Salguero, Pierce (ed.). Buddhism and Medicine: An Anthology of Modern and Contemporary Sources. New York: Columbia University Press, 2019, pp. 100–107.
- "Japanese Buddhist Women's 'Way of Healing.'" In Salguero, Pierce (ed.). Buddhism and Medicine: An Anthology of Modern and Contemporary Sources. New York: Columbia University Press, 2019, pp. 310–316.

== Works cited ==
- Arai, Paula Kane Robinson (1990). "Soto Zen Nuns in Modern Japan: Keeping and Creating Tradition" (PDF). Bulletin of the Nanzan Institute for Religion & Culture. 14: 38–51.
- Cogan, Gina (2012). "Review". Monumenta Nipponica. 67 (2): 361–363.
- Tsomo, Karma Lekshe (2021). "Paula Kane Robinson Arai: Navigating Cultural Intimacy and Scholarly Authority". In Colleen Hartung (ed.). Challenging Bias against Women Academics in Religion. Atla Open Press. pp. 177–208. doi:10.31046/atlaopenpress.46. ISBN 978-1949800272.
