= Kyoki Roberts =

Rev. Kyōki Roberts
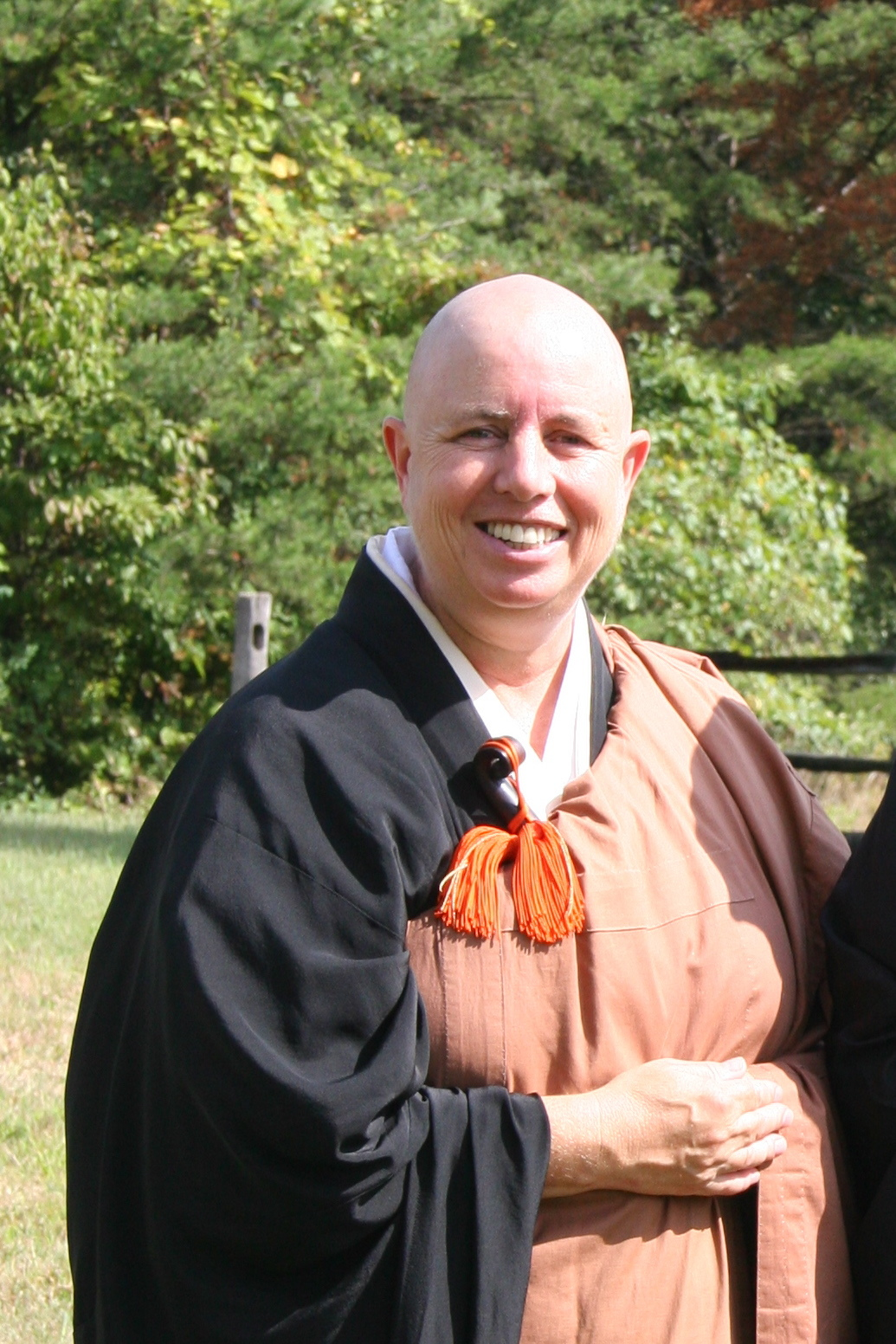

Personal life
- Born: Christine Munroe Roberts; December 17, 1951 Sewickley, Pennsylvania, U.S.
- Died: December 19, 2023 (age 72) Omaha, Nebraska, U.S.

Religious life
- Religion: Buddhism
- School: Sōtō

Senior posting
- Predecessor: Nonin Chowaney

Rev. Kyōki Roberts (OPW) (December 17, 1951 – December 19, 2023), born Christine Munroe Roberts, was an American Sōtō Zen priest from Pennsylvania. She was founder and head priest of the Zen Center of Pittsburgh.

== Early life and education ==
Christine Roberts was from Sewickley, Pennsylvania, the daughter of Joseph Loughrey Roberts Jr. and Helen Shaw Roberts. She was raised on her family's farm; her father also owned a jewelry store. She graduated from Sewickley Academy in 1969, and earned a degree in agriculture from Colorado State University in 1973. She studied Buddhism in Minnesota, California, and Japan in the 1990s, after her marriage ended.

== Career ==
Roberts ran an organic farm near Yutan, Nebraska, with her husband in the 1980s, and worked as a professional mediator, helping other farmers negotiate with creditors. "We were literally telling people to check their guns at the door," she later recalled of that work. She was ordained as a Zen priest in 1993, and chose the name Kyōki Einin Roberts at that time.

In September 2000, she opened the Zen Center of Pittsburgh on a six-acre farm in Bell Acres. Her teacher Nonin Chowaney attended the center's dedication. The facility hosted overnight guests and services on weekdays, which raised local concerns about land use and traffic. She published a cookbook, Stone Soup, in 2002. She taught meditation to prisoners in Cambria County.

Roberts blended her practice with art during the 2003 exhibition Gestures: An Exhibition of Small Site-Specific Works at The Mattress Factory Museum in Pittsburgh. Her installation exhibit, No where to go; nothing to do: Just Sitting, invited visitors to experience aspects of Zazen (seated meditation).

Chowaney represented the Order of the Prairie Wind when he returned to the Zen Center to assist Roberts in performing an ordination in 2005. In 2008, Roberts helped welcome a handmade erhu to Pittsburgh. In 2011, she founded An Olive Branch, a project to address the aftermath of sexual misconduct scandals in religious communities.

== Personal life ==
Roberts married Charles Eliason and had a son, Joe. She and Eliason divorced in 1989. In 2016, she moved to Omaha, Nebraska, to care for the aged Chowaney and to be closer to her grown son and his family. Her existing health issues were exacerbated by COVID-19 in 2021, and she used a supplemental oxygen in her last years. Chowaney died in 2022, and she died in 2023, at the age of 72, in Omaha.

== See also ==
- Buddhism in the United States
- Timeline of Zen Buddhism in the United States
