= Minnesota Zen Meditation Center =

Zen community in Minnesota, US

Coordinates: 44.941946°N 93.303285°W

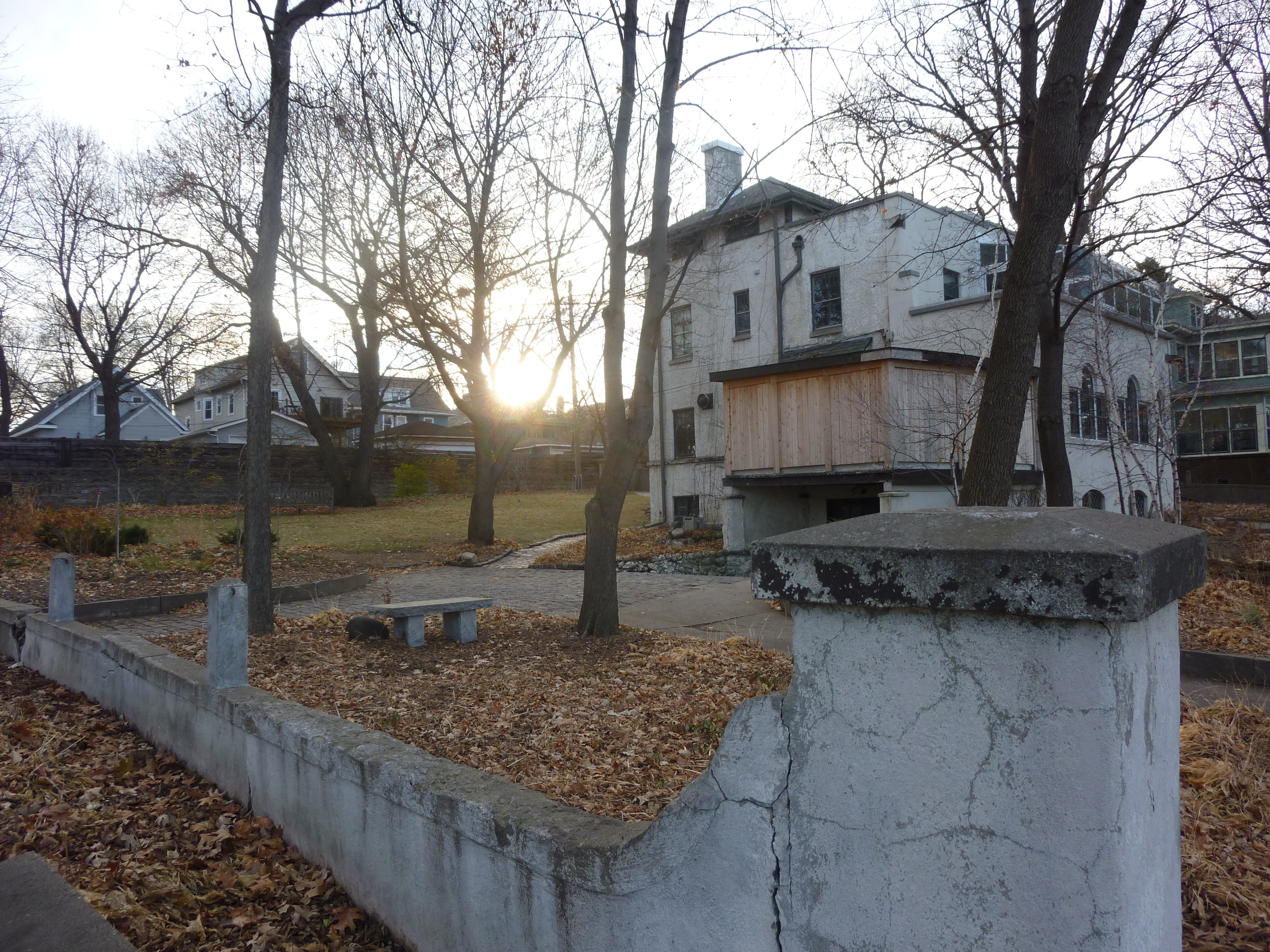
- The center faces Bde Maka Ska

Religion
- Affiliation: Sōtō Zen Buddhism

Location
- Location: 3343 East Bde Maka Ska Parkway, Minneapolis, Minnesota 55408
- Country: United States
- Interactive map of Minnesota Zen Meditation Center

Architecture
- Founder: Dainin Katagiri
- Completed: 1972

Website
- http://mnzencenter.org

The Minnesota Zen Meditation Center (Kounzan Ganshoji, "Cultivating Clouds Mountain, Living in Vow Temple") is an urban, non-residential, Sōtō Zen practice community in Minneapolis, Minnesota. Since 2019, MZMC has been led by two co-guiding Dharma teachers, Tim Burkett and Ted O'Toole.

== History ==
Minnesota Zen Meditation Center (MZMC) was founded in 1972 by Dainin Katagiri Roshi (1928-1990), who was invited to come to Minnesota by a small but growing group of practitioners, many of whom had ties to the San Francisco Zen Center where Katagiri had served as a priest since 1965. Upon first arriving in Minnesota, Katagiri held zazen and services on the second floor of a 4-plex apartment building in South East Minneapolis, establishing himself as the first Zen teacher to settle in the Midwest.

The burgeoning group officially incorporated as the Minnesota Zen Meditation Center in December 1973, and by May 1975 had raised enough funds (aided partially by royalties from Robert Pirsig's book, Zen and the Art of Motorcycle Maintenance) to purchase the white stucco house at 3343 East Bde Maka Ska Parkway, where MZMC still resides today. The official opening ceremony was held on February 1, 1976.

Since its purchase, the MZMC building has undergone several renovations. Most recently, the 2019 "Open Hearts - Open Spaces" fundraising campaign raised enough capital to fund the construction of a new zendo, a temple gate, an expanded library, as well as the addition of handicap accessible bathrooms, the repair of aging stucco, and the replacement of several windows.

== Programming ==
The Minnesota Zen Meditation Center offers Zen meditation (zazen), lectures, work practice, contemporary retreats and traditional sesshin, as well as classes and workshops on Buddhist studies.

== Guiding Teachers ==
Since 1972, Minnesota Zen Meditation Center has had five guiding teachers:

- Dainin Katagiri (1972 - 1990)
- Shohaku Okumura (1993 - 1996)
- Karen Sunna (1996 - 2002)
- Tim Burkett (2002 - 2019)
- Ted O'Toole (Guiding Teacher 2019–Present)
- Ben Connelly (Assistant Guiding Teacher)

== See also ==
- MZMC Official Website
- Buddhism in the United States
- Timeline of Zen Buddhism in the United States
