= Aoyama Rōshi =

Japanese Buddhist nun (born 1933)

Aoyama Roshi
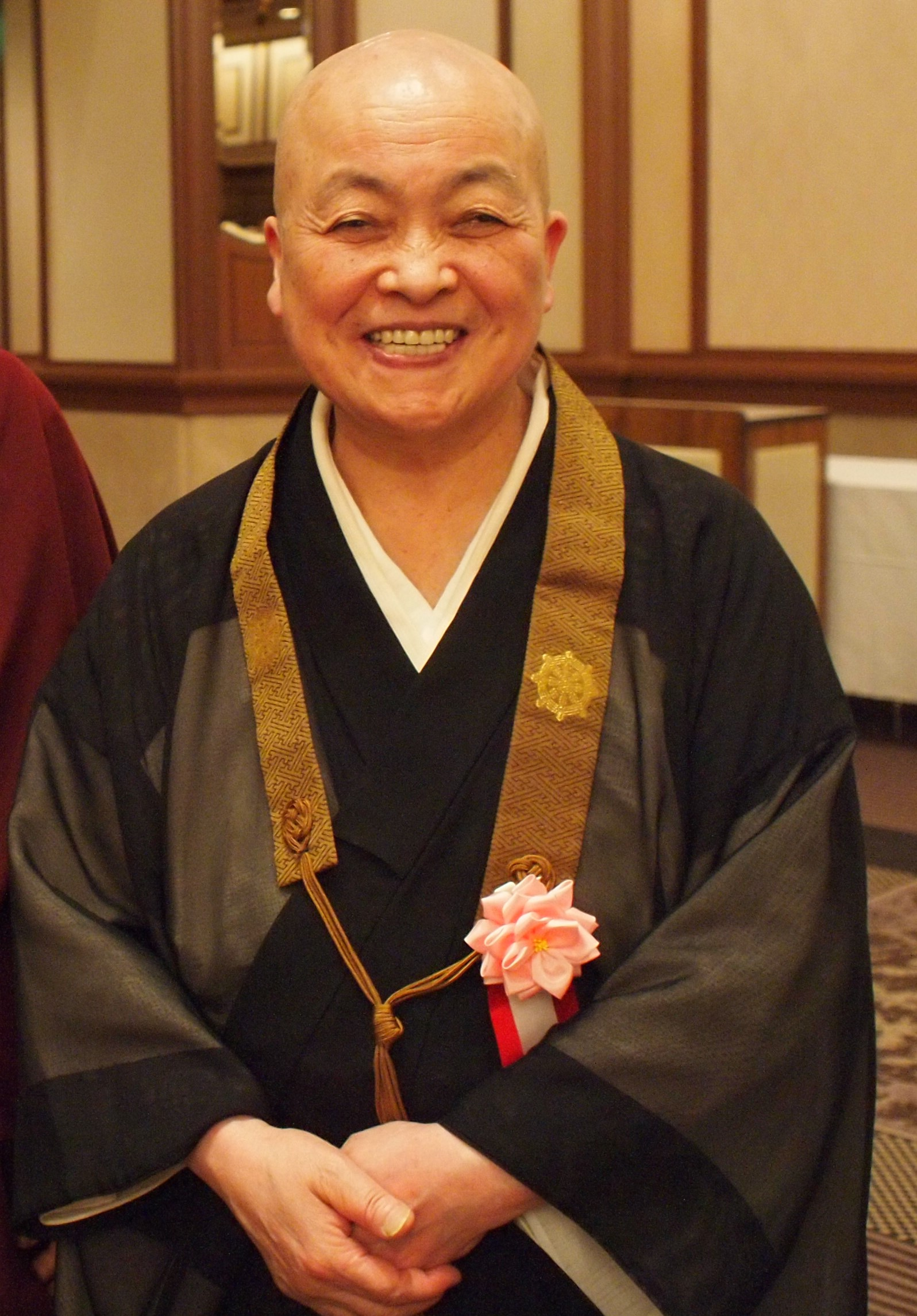
- Shundo Aoyama Roshi

Personal life
- Born: 1933 (age 92–93) Aichi Province, Nagoya Prefecture, Japan
- Known for: First nun to be appointed to the rank of Daikyoshi

Religious life
- Religion: Sōtō Zen

Shundo Aoyama Rōshi is a Japanese Buddhist nun and abbess. She is the first nun to be appointed to the rank of Daikyoshi (Great Teacher) in the Soto Zen school.

== Early life ==
Aoyama Rōshi was born in 1933 in Aichi Prefecture, near Tokyo, Japan. Considered by her mother as a gift from the Buddha, she entered the temple of Muryô-ji at the age of five under the care of her aunt, where she received a religious education. In 1948, she was ordained and was one of the first nuns to receive a Master of Arts degree from Komazawa University, the university of Soto School of Zen where she studied scriptures, rituals and meditation, and learned the sutras and stories of great Zen masters.

== Career ==
Aoyama Rōshi's career as a lecturer began by leading sesshin (periods of intensive practice) and teaching the art of tea (Dhado), calligraphy (Shodo) and floral arrangement (Kado). In 1976 she became abbess of Aichi Senmon Nisodo and as a recognized Zen Master she assumed the task of training novices. In 1984 Aoyama Rōshi became abbess of Tokubetsu in Aichi Senmon Nisodo where she trained special monastics to become teachers of the tradition, trained nuns, gave Dharma transmission, and was authorized to designate her own Dharma heir. She is the first nun to be appointed to the rank of Daikyoshi (Great Teacher) in the Soto Zen school. She has received a lifetime achievement award for her valuable contributions to Japanese society and Buddhist culture, especially in the area of women's advancement. She is known internationally chiefly through her students who have studied under her and have gone to other countries to teach and carry on the tradition of Buddhism in other parts of the world. As a woman, she has ensured the future of the monastic Buddhist lineage for women.

== Background ==
The Buddha himself did not allow women to become monks. Women were thought to be innately foolish, to have bonds of attachment, to be immersed in the river of desire, to prioritize sensory pleasure and material objects, to be indolent, proud and idle. The Buddha also thought that women would damage Buddhism's reputation. Ananda, an early follower of the Buddha, pleaded with the Buddha to allow women's ordination. Ananda was cited as "the great hero." In Aoyama's writing, Ananda is referred to as the great heroine rather than a great hero. According to research findings, the Buddha finally gave in and encouraged all women to honor Ananda. In her commentary on the Anan koshiki, a ritual honoring Ananda, Aoyama feminizes Ananda.

In the late 1800s the status of nuns in Japanese society was low. The living conditions were poor, and nuns were held to a stricter standard of discipline than monks. Back in the 1200s however, Dogen (1200–1253) had founded the Soto Zen school which had an egalitarian stance. Dogen believed that women and men were equally capable of practicing zazen. Gradually, nuns began to be able to establish their own monasteries and schools. They passed regulations that allowed monastic schools for nuns to officially grant degrees recognized by the Ministry of Education and to achieve ranks commensurate within the Buddhist hierarchy. Here, novices studied Buddhist texts, chanting classical Chinese, and calligraphy along with secular subjects.

In 1903, educator-nun Jorin Mizuno and three of her disciples, Mitsujo Hori, Dokai Ando, and Kokan Yamaguchi, founded the Aichi Senmon Nisodo where nuns dedicated themselves to learning and meditation practices in the Soto Zen tradition of Dogen and Keizan. The number of nuns grew. By 1941 the monastery had expanded to provide education to 140 nuns and has become a model of Zen training center for women. The monastery has moved to a more suitable location on a hill in a pleasant part of Nagoya. It attracts highly dedicated qualified practitioners, many from other countries who are seeking spiritual advancement. The monastery has played a major part in expanding the influence of Soto Zen internationally, by training teachers who come to Nagoya and return to their home countries to establish Zen Centers and become teachers in their own right. There are 1,000 Soto Zen nuns in Japan, the largest number of any sect of celibate practitioners.

== Rise of women in Zen Buddhism ==
Aoyama Rōshi has been a leader in the struggle for gender parity within Buddhism and has played a pivotal role in transforming attitudes toward women in contemporary Japanese society. By the time Aoyama was ordained in 1948, there were many more nuns, many of whom were able to attend university studies. From 1948 on, she played a large part in this development which has ensured the continuity of a monastic lineage that was in decline.

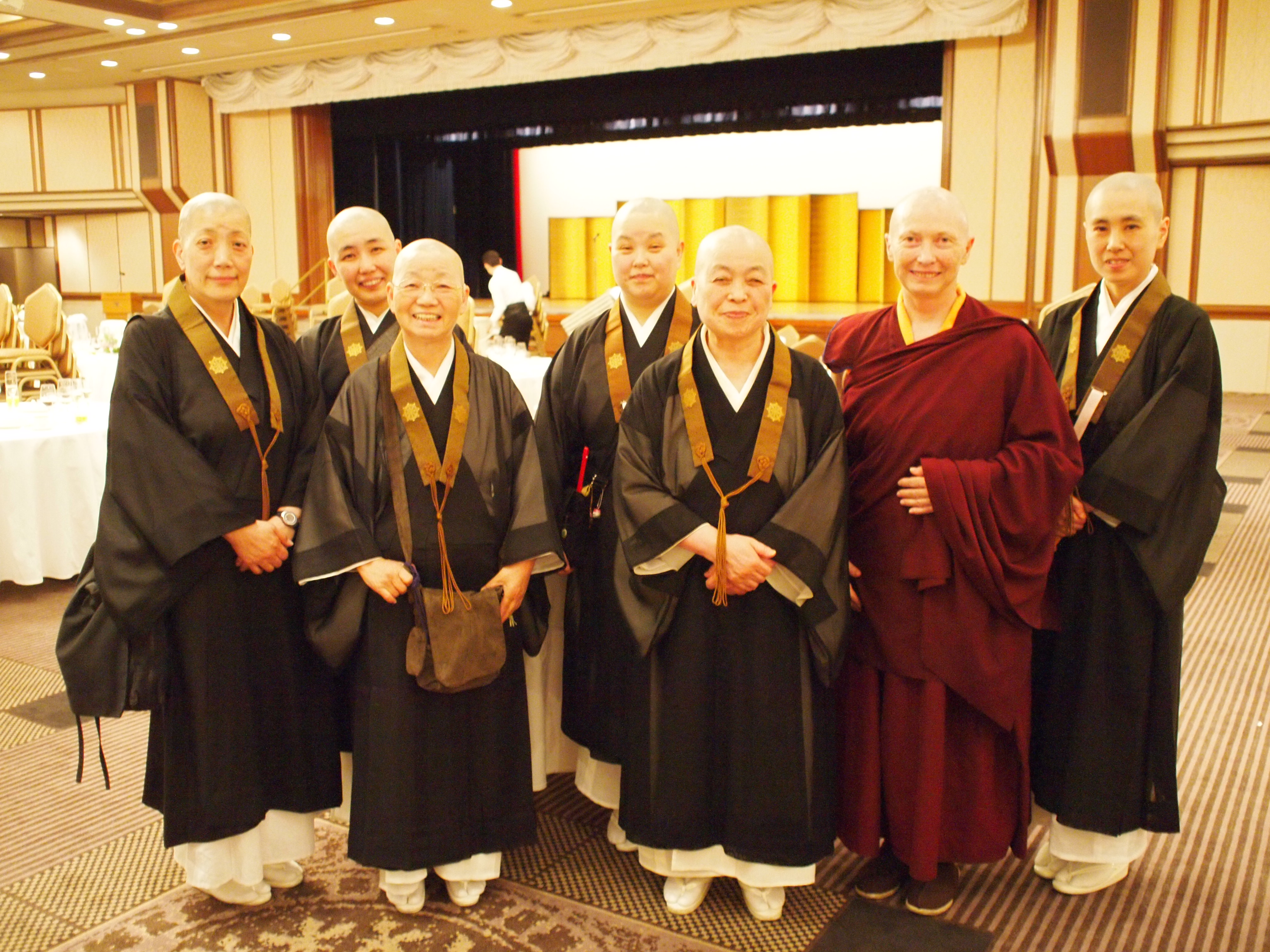
Aoyama Rōshi with group of nuns

Aoyama is well known for her work in the advancement of women in Zen Buddhism. She resides in the Nagoya monastery as chief priest of Aichi Senmon Nisodo, where she directs the leading training program for nuns. Here, she conducts classes and meditation programs for laypeople, facilitates the opening of the monastery to the public at certain times, travels back and forth between the city of Nagoya and the small town of Shiojiri to personally oversee the training and education of the nuns there, and authors books on tea ceremonies and flower arranging, among others. In 1991 she published Zen Seeds: Reflections of a Female Priest. Rōshi's writings have influenced the ethnographic studies and research of Paula Arai, an American Buddhist studies scholar.

In 2003, the Aichi Senmon Nisodo celebrated 100 years of its founding. Abbess Ayoama wrote the companion volume for the event which includes the historical background of the Anan Koshiki. Aoyama Rōshi and the nuns at Aichi Senmon Nisodo have played a pivotal role in sustaining the ritual for the Buddha's close disciple. Aoyama's attitude is quite progressive. She believes that one must throw aside one's robes and become involved in the world, to weep and laugh with others. Home visits are a regular task for a nuns practice – they chant the sutras at the family home and then stay for interpersonal exchanges. They strive to be keenly sensitive to the lives of laypeople seeking to find their way. Aoyama in particular is known for emphasizing the value of beauty in daily living: arts of tea, calligraphy, flower arrangement, also in words, gestures, and ordinary activities.

== International connections ==
Rōshi has appeared on national television, in popular magazines, and at international conferences. In 2004 she attended the 8th Sakyadhita International Conference on Buddhist Women held in Seoul Korea, visited the tomb of St. Benedict in Italy, and had a private audience with Pope John Paul II. In April and May 2022, Aoyama Rōshi lectured in France at the Temple of La Gendronnière in Valaire on the topic of "Dôgen's vision on Zen practice." In 2008 she was the keynote speaker at the 10th Sakyadhita, held in Ulaanbaatar, Mongolia, where she spoke about Buddhism in transition. Yusho Sasaaki Rōshi, a former student, has been chosen as the first Soto Zen female bishop of Europe. Another student, Yuko Wakayama Yamada, has been invited to teach monks on Dogen at Eiheiji.

== Partial list of publications ==
Some of Aoyama Rōshi's books are based on early Buddhist texts, and others are based on later Zen texts. In all, she has written some 50 books on a range of topics.

- Chazen Kanwa: Chanoyu juniwa (Quiet Talks on Zen Tea: Twelve Tales of Tea) (in Japanese). (1978) Tokyo Japan: Nakayama Shobo Buddha Shorin
- Tenchi ippai ni ikiru (Fully Living Sky and Earth). 1982. Tokyo: Soto-shu Shumucho.
- Nori no kemansho: Hokkugyo yomikata (Flower Garlands of the Dharma: a Taste of the Dhammapada). 1984. Tokyo: Kashiwagi-Sha.
- Zen Seeds: Reflections of a Female Priest. 1991. Tokyo Japan: Kosei Publishing Company. ISBN 978-4-333-01478-1.
- Zen no chie: Shobogenzo zuimonki (Zen wisdom: lessons learned from the Shobogenzo Zuimonki). 1994. Tokyo: Suzuki publishing.
- Tenza kyokun (Instructions from the Cook). 1995. Kowa: Kashiwagi-sha.
- Shufu no tomo sha (Flowers of Compassion). 1997. Tokyo: Hana Ulyo.
- Mo hitori no watashi e no tabi ( A Journey to Another Me). 1997. Tokyo: Yayoi Shobo.
- Michi haruka naritomo (The Path is a little far). 1998. Kosei Publishing.
- Waga jinsei wo dou ryori suruka (How to Cook My Life). 2001. Tokyo: Shunjyu-sha.
- Hannya shinkyo monogatari ( Stories of the Heart of Wisdom Sutra). 2002. Tokyo: Yayoi Shobou.
- Shin utsukushiki hitoni: Zen ni ikiru nisou no kotoba (Becoming a Beautiful Person: The Words of a Nun Living Zen). 2004.Tokyo: Pataka.
- Chazen kanwa: Shorai ni kiku (Quiet Conversations on Zen Tea: Listening to the Wind in the Pines) 2007. Tokyo: Nakayamashobou Busshorin.
- Kurenai ni inochi kagayaku: Zen ni tersarete (Polishing Life an Offering: Illuminated by Zen) 2015 Tokyo: Shunjyu-sha
- Numa ga arukara hana wa saku (Because There is Mud, Flowers Bloom). 2016. Tokyo: Gentosha.
- Zen Seeds: 60 Essential Buddhist Teachings on Effort, Gratitude, and Happiness (2nd ed.). 2019. Boulder Colorado: Shambala. ISBN 9781611807325
