= Pure Land Buddhism =

School of Mahāyāna Buddhism

Pure Land Buddhism or the Pure Land School (Chinese: 淨土宗; pinyin: Jìngtǔzōng) is a broad branch of Mahayana Buddhism focused on achieving rebirth in a Pure Land. It is one of the most widely practiced traditions of Buddhism in East Asia. It is also known as the "Lotus School" (蓮宗; Liánzōng) in China or the "Nembutsu school" in Japan. East Asian Pure Land mainly relies on three main Mahayana scriptures: the Sutra of Amitayus, the Contemplation Sutra and the Amitabha Sutra.

The Pure Land tradition is primarily focused on achieving rebirth in a Buddha's "pure land" after death, which are considered to be the superior places to attain full Buddhahood. Once there, one can meet a Buddha face to face and study under them without any of the distractions or fears of our world. Since it is much easier to attain enlightenment in a pure land, many Mahayana Buddhists strive to be reborn in one. The most popular one today is Sukhavati ("Land of Bliss"), the pure land of Buddha Amitābha, though some Buddhists may also aspire to be reborn in other pure lands (such as Maitreya's and Medicine Guru's). Although Buddhas are venerated in Pure Land and are seen as savior-like figures, the tradition clearly distinguishes itself from theistic religions, due to its roots in the classic Mahayana understanding of buddhas and bodhisattvas, as well as the Buddhist doctrines of emptiness and mind-only.

The most distinctive feature of East Asian Pure Land traditions is that it offers ordinary people (even the unlearned and the unethical) hope that they may attain the stage of non-retrogression and eventually Buddhahood, no matter how bad their karma may be. In East Asian Pure Land, this is most commonly accomplished through the practice of mindfulness of the Buddha, i.e. niànfó (Chinese: 念佛, "Buddha recitation", Japanese: nenbutsu) and entails reciting the name of Amitabha (Chinese: Āmítuófó, Japanese: Amida). However, Pure Land Buddhism may also include numerous other practices which are done alongside Buddha recitation, such as keeping Buddhist precepts, reciting sutras, visualization, and making offerings.

Pure Land oriented practices and concepts form an important component of the Mahāyāna Buddhist traditions of China, Japan, Korea, Vietnam, the Himalayas and Inner Asian regions such as Tibet. Some East Asian traditions are exclusively Pure Land oriented, especially the Japanese sects like Jōdo-shū and Jōdo Shinshū. In Tibetan Buddhism, prayers and practices which aim at rebirth in a buddha-field are also a popular religious orientation, especially among laypersons.

== Terminology ==
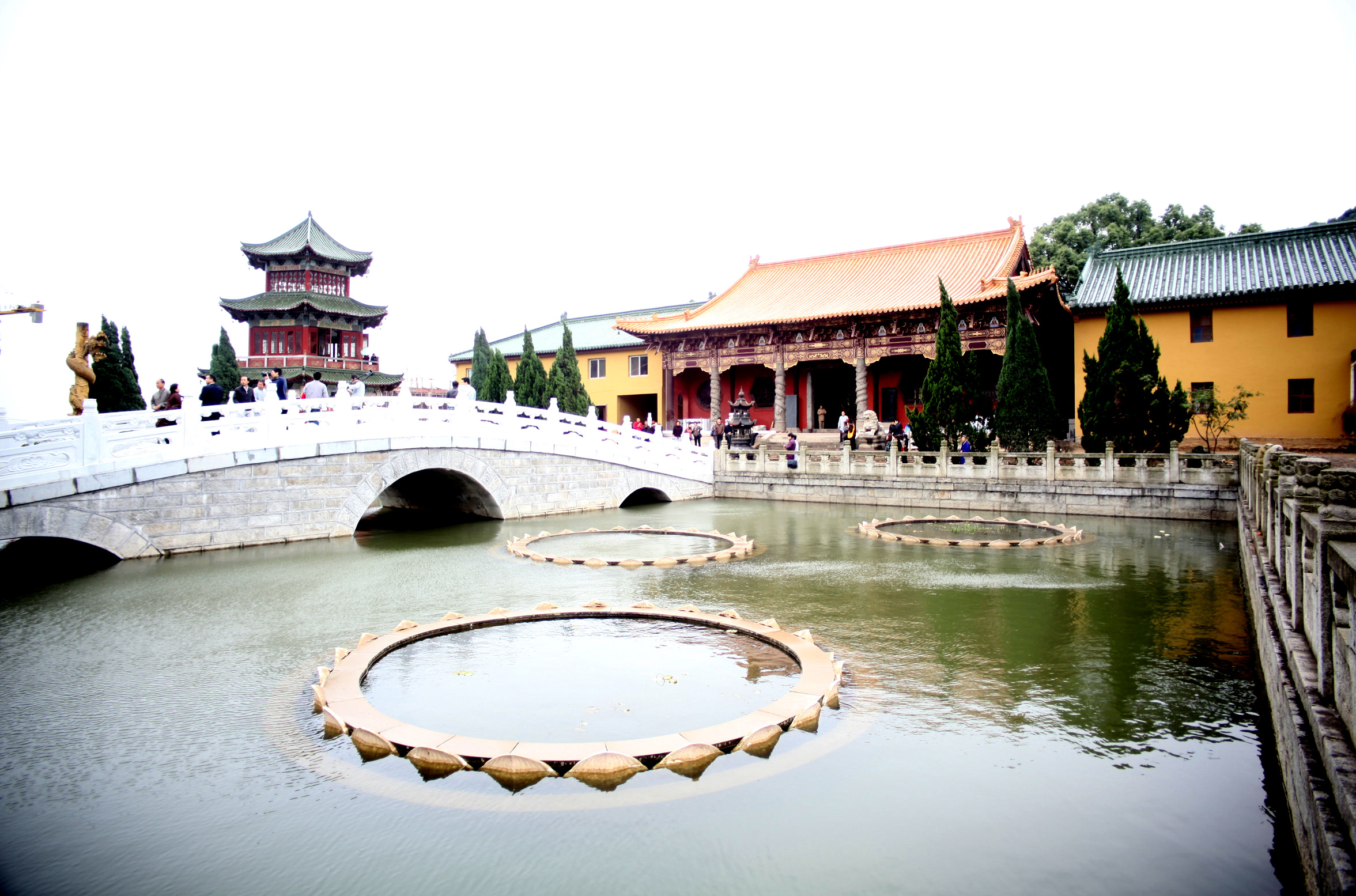
Lotus pond at Donglin temple, a key temple in the history of the Pure land school

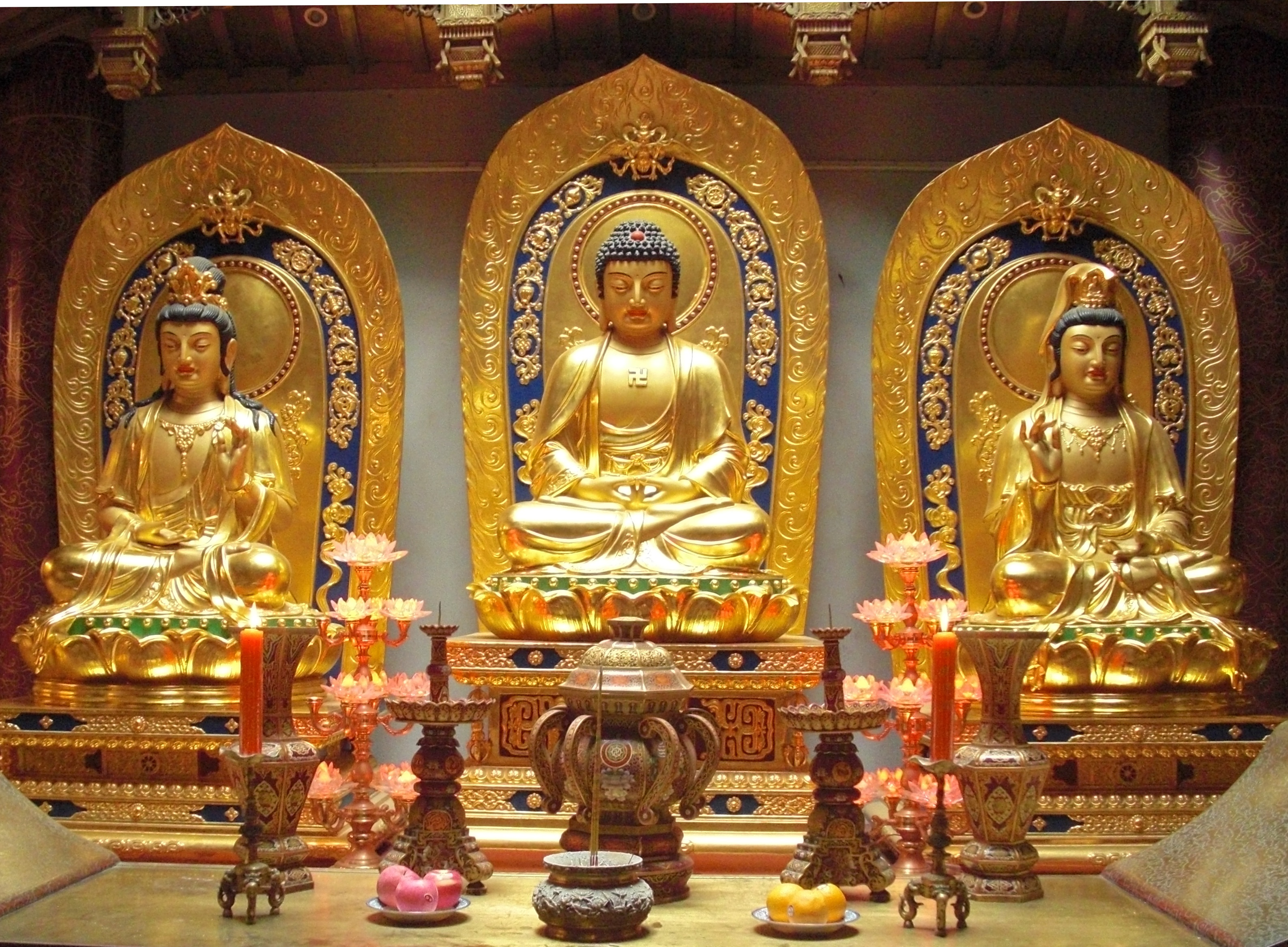
Amitābha and his attendant bodhisattvas Avalokiteśvara (right) and Mahāsthāmaprāpta (left)

The English term "Pure Land Buddhism" can refer to two religious phenomena. One referent of the term "Pure Land" is a collective term for all practices and teachings having to do with a Buddha's "pure land" or buddha-field (Sanskrit: buddhakṣetra). This usage corresponds with the Chinese term "Pure land Dharma gate" (淨土法門; jìngtǔ fǎmén) which refers to a spiritual practice or a specific approach to the (Buddhist) Dharma. Since this is a generic term for all "pure land methods", it technically includes practices in many different Buddhist schools, including Tiantai, Tibetan Buddhism, and so on, and not just those of "Pure Land schools" or sects.

"Pure Land Buddhism" is also commonly used to refer to various separate Pure Land traditions which take Pure land practice as the central element of their teaching, sometimes exclusively so. In Chinese Buddhism, Pure Land is often thought of as its own zōng (school), like Zen and so forth. Thus, this usage corresponds to the East Asian term "Pure Land school". (Note: Chinese: 淨土宗; pinyin: Jìngtǔzōng; Japanese: 浄土仏教, romanized: Jōdo bukkyō; Korean: 정토종; RR: Jeongto-jong; Vietnamese: Tịnh độ tông) In Japanese Buddhism, the term more commonly refers to specific institutions like Jōdo-shū and Jōdo Shinshū.

Another common name for the Pure Land school in Chinese Buddhism is "Lotus School" (蓮宗; Liánzōng), drawing its name from the various Pure land Lotus Societies, the first of which was founded by Huiyuan (334–416). In Japanese Buddhism meanwhile, another name for the Pure Land schools is "Nembutsu school".

When referring to traditions which focus on rebirth in the pure land of Amitabha (阿弥陀, amida), scholars may also use the term "Amidism". Similarly, traditional sources do sometimes speak of "Amida's Dharma."

== India ==
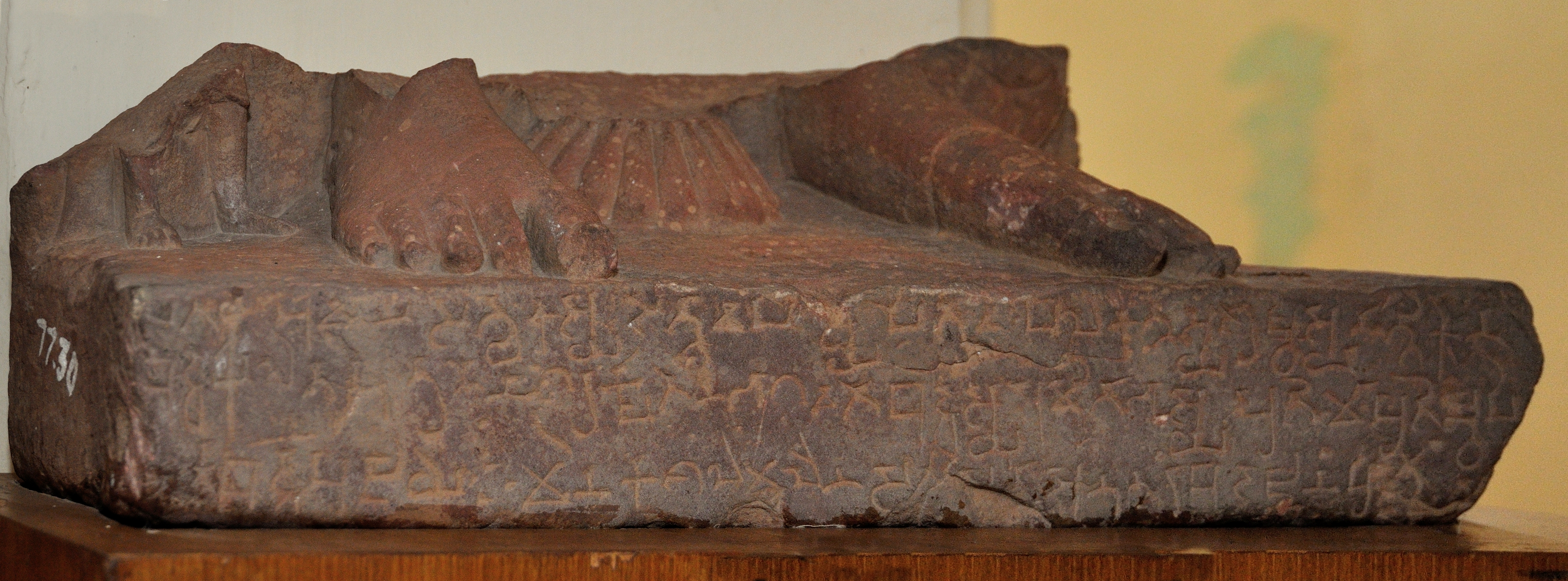
Inscribed pedestal with the first known occurrence of the name of Amitabha Buddha (c. 153 CE). The Brahmi inscription states "Bu-ddha-sya A-mi-tā-bha-sya"; "Of the Buddha Amitabha."

=== Mindfulness of the Buddha ===
Teachings which focus on seeking rebirth in a buddha-field (buddhakṣetra) were first developed in Indian Mahayana Buddhist Sutras, and were very popular in Kashmir and Central Asia, where they might have originated. The methods taught in the Mahayana sources which discuss buddhakṣetras are generally devotional Mahayana forms of the classic Buddhist practice known as mindfulness of the Buddha (Skt. buddhānusmṛti). Andrew Skilton argues that the intermingling of Mahāyāna teachings with Sarvāstivādin meditation traditions in Kashmir led to the Buddha meditation practices which later influenced Pure Land in China.

Remembrance of the Buddha is an early Buddhist practice which was taught in the Early Buddhist Texts. According to Paul Harrison, the term anusmṛti means 'recollection', 'remembrance', and, by extension, 'calling to mind', 'keeping in mind' (cf. smriti, commonly translated as 'mindfulness'). Buddha recollection was part of a group of anusmṛti practices. In the Anguttara Nikaya, one finds six anusmṛtis: the Buddha, the Dhamma, the Sangha, sila (moral observance), caga (liberality), and the devata (gods). In the Sutta Nipata, a Brahmin follower of the Buddha, named Pingiya, notes that even though his physical state does not allow him to be with the Buddha personally,

there is no moment for me, however small, that is spent away from Gotama, from this universe of wisdom, this world of understanding ... with constant and careful vigilance it is possible for me to see him with my mind as clearly as with my eyes, in night as well as day. And since I spend my nights revering him, there is not, to my mind, a single moment spent away from him.

The Ekottara-agama (EA) also contains various unique passages on buddhānusmṛti. EA III, 1 (Taisho Vol. II, p. 554a7-b9) states that buddhānusmṛti can lead to the unconditioned, nirvana, as well as magic power. This sutra explains that a monk should sit down and "contemplates the image of the Tathagatha without taking his eyes off it...he calls to mind the qualities of the Tathagatha." These qualities which one contemplates include his vajra body, ten powers, his moral qualities, samadhis and wisdom (prajña). According to Paul Williams, this practice of "Buddha mindfulness" gained further importance within Mahayana Buddhism, which had an expanded cosmology that held that there were infinite numbers of Buddhas and Bodhisattvas living in infinite Buddhafields throughout the universe. The practice of mindfulness of the Buddhas was seen as a way to contact these living Buddhas and attain awakening. For example, the Saptaśatikā (700 line) Prajñāpāramitā Sūtra states that through the 'Single Deed Samadhi' one can quickly attain enlightenment:

The meditators should live in seclusion, cast away discursive thoughts, not cling to the appearance of things, concentrate their minds on a Buddha, and recite his name single-mindedly. They should keep their bodies erect and, facing the direction of that Buddha, meditate upon him continuously. If they can maintain mindfulness of the Buddha without interruption from moment to moment, then they will be able to see all the Buddhas of the past, present, and future right in each moment.

A related idea associated with this Mahayana Buddhology was that through proper conduct, worship, and meditation, one could attain rebirth in the Buddha-field of one of these Buddhas.

==== Buddha-field concept ====
In the more expansive Mahayana cosmology, there are an infinite number of Buddhas, and each one has a field of activity where they teach and guide sentient beings to awakening. This teaching activity, which is done out of a sense of great compassion, is how Buddhas and bodhisattvas "purify" their Buddha-fields. Indeed, the very existence of a buddha-field depends on the acts of a bodhisattva on their path to Buddhahood. According to Jan Nattier, these ideas may have developed out of meditative experiences which provided certain meditators with "visions of a universe far more vast than had previously been supposed", with many world systems, some of which contained other Buddhas. This introduced the possibility that one could be reborn in these Buddha-fields.

Indian Mahayanists also held that these buddha-fields had a splendor and purity that matched the purity of the Buddha's mind. Sentient beings who are reborn in these pure buddha-fields due to their good karma also contribute to the development of a Buddha-field, as can bodhisattvas who are able to travel there. These buddha-fields are therefore powerful places which are very advantageous to spiritual progress.

According to Jan Nattier, the wish to be reborn in a Buddhafield may have become popular in India due to the common idea that the bodhisattva path was very difficult and entailed much suffering and self-sacrifice. It also was seen as lasting a very long time, in some formulations, it lasts three incalculable eons (asamkhyeya kalpas), which would mean spending millions of lifetimes on the path.

Not all buddha-fields appear as perfectly 'pure', and some Mahayana sutras speak of three kinds of buddha-fields: impure, pure, and mixed. Thus, an impure buddha-field (like this world, called Sahā—"the world to be endured"—which is Sakyamuni Buddha's field), includes non-Buddhists, immoral people, and so on. On the other hand, purified buddha-fields, like Amitabha's, are described as beautiful places, covered in beryl and gold, without any filth or evil. However, different Mahayana texts explain the nature of Sakyamuni's buddhafield in different ways. According to Paul Williams, some sutras adopt the view that Sakyamuni's buddhafield is impure because, due to his vast compassion, he works to help all beings, even the most impure. Thus, while some Buddhas like Amitabha, teach the beings who aspire to be born in their pure buddha-fields, other Buddhas (like Sakyamuni) "vow to appear as Buddhas in impure realms, tainted Buddha Fields, out of their great compassion." This is the view of Sakyamuni's buddha-field which is found in the Lotus Sutra, which according to Williams "sought to restore Sakyamuni to pre-eminence in the face of Pure Land cults centred on Amitayus and Aksobhya."

According to the Vimalakirti sutra, this seemingly impure world, Sakyamuni's buddha-field, is actually a purified buddha-field. It only appears to be impure because the minds of sentient beings perceive it to be impure. As Williams explains, the view of the Vimalakirti sutra is that: "The impurity that we see is the result of impure awareness, and also the Buddha's compassion in creating a world within which impure beings can grow. Thus the real way to attain a Pure Land is to purify one's own mind. Put another way, we are already in the Pure Land if we but knew it. Whatever the realm, if it is inhabited by people with enlightened pure minds then it is a Pure Land."

There was never any Indian "school" focused on this method, as it was considered one of the many goals and methods of Indian Mahayana Buddhism. There is also very little evidence for an Amitabha cult per se in India according to Williams. Furthermore, the East Asian term "pure land" or "purified ground" (Chinese: jìngtǔ) is not a translation of any particular Indic term, and Indian authors almost always used the term buddhakṣetra. However, it is possible the Chinese term is related to the Sanskrit term pariśuddha-buddhakṣetra (purified buddhafield).

=== Mahayana sources ===
==== Pratyutpanna Samādhi Sūtra ====
The Pratyutpanna Samādhi Sūtra gives an early description of the practice of reciting the name of Amitābha as a meditation method, although it does not enumerate any vows of Amitābha or the qualities of his Buddha-field of Sukhāvatī. This sutra is one of the earliest Mahayana sutras translated into Chinese (it was eventually translated into Chinese four times). The sutra focuses on the pratyutpanna-buddha-sammukhavasthita-samadhi which means "the samadhi of the one who stands (avasthita) face-to-face with, or in the presence of (sammukha), the present (pratyutpanna) Buddhas."

This sutra also contains the earliest textual reference to Amitabha, though the context of the reference makes it clear that the Pratyutpanna Samādhi is not exclusively for meeting Amitabha but can be used to meet any present Buddha. According to the Pratyutpanna, a practitioner must first strictly keep to the Buddhist moral code and then enter solitary retreat. In the retreat, they concentrate their thoughts on the Buddha Amitabha and thus practice buddhānusmṛti. They contemplate his qualities (such as being a Tathagata, a knower of the world, teacher of devas and humans) and his body, with the thirty two marks of the great man and a golden color, which shines brightly, sitting on a throne and teaching the Dharma. This practice is to be done for days or even three months, until they have visions of the Buddha (either while awake during the day or in a dream at night) at which point they may worship and receive teachings from Amitabha. Thus they can become very learned (bahusruta) bodhisattvas in this way. The sutra also states:

Bodhisattvas hear about the Buddha Amitābha and call him to mind again and again in this land. Because of this calling to mind, they see the Buddha Amitābha. Having seen him they ask him what dharmas it takes to be born in the realm of the Buddha Amitābha. Then the Buddha Amitābha says to these bodhisattvas: "If you wish to come and be born in my realm, you must always call me to mind again and again, you must always keep this thought in mind without letting up, and thus you will succeed in coming to be born in my realm."

According to the sutra, these visions are not said to be the result of the divine eye (or other magical powers), instead the Buddhas appear to the meditator's vision.

The sutra also seeks to explain how it is possible to have these visions and what their nature is like. According to the sutra, the nature of the visions are dream-like and the sutra states that they are possible because all phenomena are empty and made by mind. According to the Pratyutpanna, these visions are possible because: "this triple world is nothing but thought. That is because however I discriminate things [Skt. vikalpayati, mentally construct], so they appear." The sutra also links this visionary samadhi with the realization of emptiness, stating that "he who obtains the samadhi of emptiness by thus concentrating on the Tathagata without apprehending him, he is known as one who calls to mind the Buddha." Thus, one should not think that these Buddhas actually come from somewhere or go anywhere, they are to be understood as similar to empty space and as not existing in some substantial or objective way, since they are empty, like all dharmas, of inherent existence (svabhavena sunya).

==== Sukhāvatīvyūha Sūtras ====
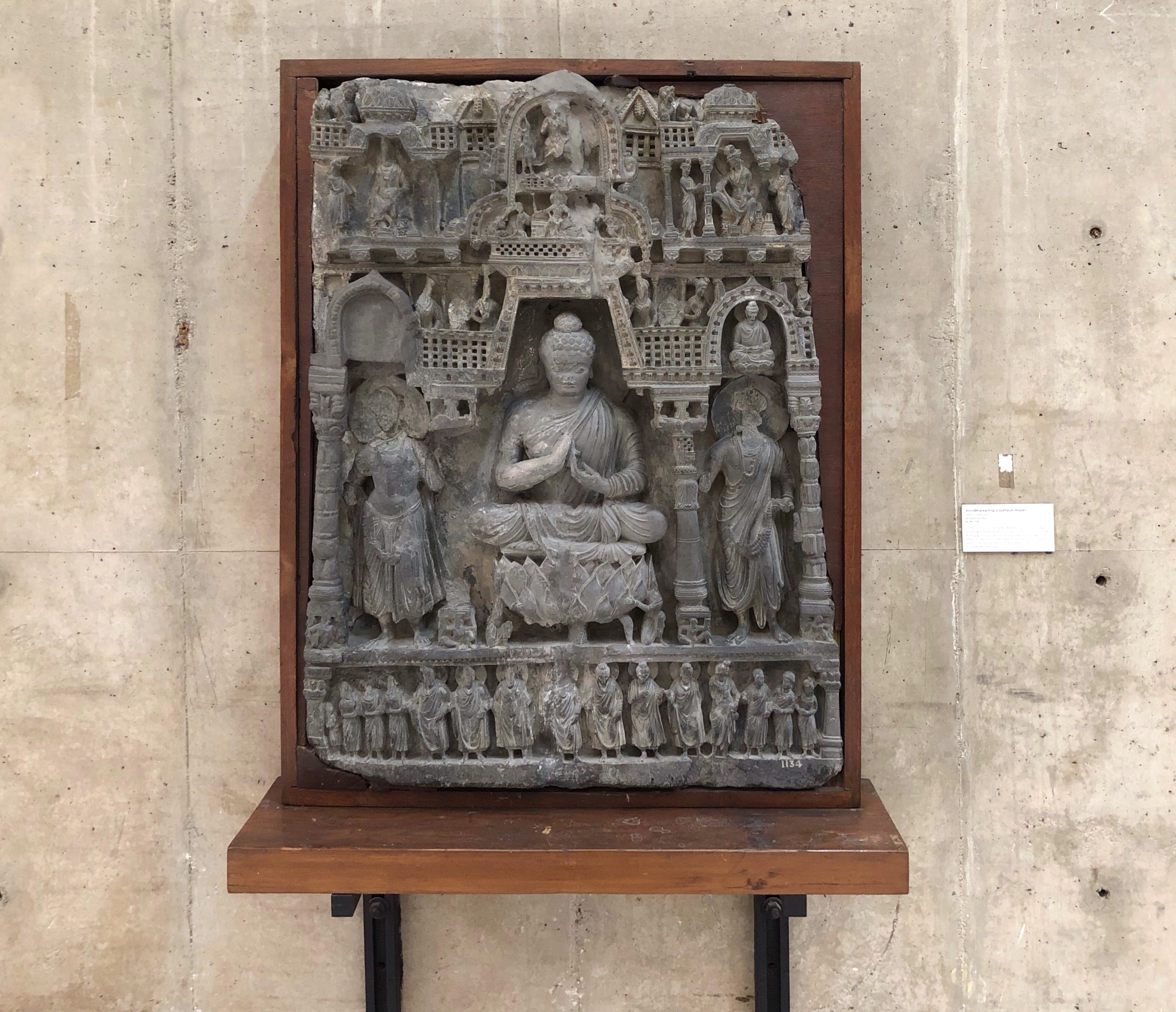
Gandharan sculpture of Amitabha in Sukhavati, 2nd century CE, from Khyber Pakhtunkhwa, Pakistan

The two most important Indian sutras for the East Asian Pure Land tradition are the Longer Sukhāvatīvyūha Sūtra, and the Shorter Sukhāvatīvyūha Sūtra. These sutras describe Amitābha (whose name means Immeasurable Light), and his pure buddha-field of Sukhavati (which is said to excel all buddhafields). They also discuss his various bodhisattva vows, which focus on his buddhafield as well as discussing how he attained Buddhahood. As Williams writes, the Longer sutra also states that "those who sincerely trust in Amitabha and desire to be reborn in his Pure Land need "call on the name" of Amitabha only 10 times and they will be reborn there – provided they have not committed any of the five great crimes of murdering father or mother, or an Arhat, harming a Buddha, or causing schism in the sangha, or have slandered the Dharma."

According to the longer sutra, those who wish to be reborn in Sukhavati should give rise to bodhicitta, meditate on Amitabha, hear and recite his name, pray to reborn in Sukhavati, and accumulate merit. Then at the time of death, Amitabha will appear to those who have sincerely practiced and wished to be reborn there and lead them to Sukhavati. Bodhisattvas who reach Sukhavati from other lands will also be able to enter the stage of "one more birth" (left until Buddhahood) and they will also be able to be reborn from Sukhavati into other worlds to help beings. From Sukhavati, beings will also be able to visit other buddha-fields to see many other Buddhas. Thus, this buddha-field makes it much easier for someone to attain enlightenment.

According to Julian Pas, the long and short Sukhāvatīvyūha sūtras were composed during the 1st and 2nd centuries CE, though he considers the smaller Sukhāvatīvyūha to be earlier. Andrew Skilton writes that the descriptions of Sukhāvatī given in the Sukhāvatīvyūha sūtras suggests that these descriptions were originally used for meditation: "This land, called Sukhāvatī or "blissful," is described in great detail, in a way that suggests that the sūtras were to be used as guides to visualization meditation, and also gives an impression of a magical world of intense visual and sonorous delight." According to Nakamura, the Longer Sukhāvatīvyūha might have been influenced by the Lokottaravāda school, since the work has many elements in common with the Mahāvastu.

In the Longer Sukhāvatīvyūha Sūtra, Gautama Buddha begins by describing to his attendant Ānanda a past life of the Buddha Amitābha. He states that in a past life, Amitābha was once a king who renounced his kingdom, and became a monastic bodhisattva named Dharmākara ("Dharma Storehouse") and gave rise to the aspiration to achieve Buddhahood in order to help all beings. He also had the aspiration to create the most perfect buddha-field as the ideal place to reach awakening. Under the guidance of the Buddha Lokeśvararāja ("World Sovereign King"), innumerable buddha-lands throughout the ten directions were revealed to Dharmākara. After meditating for five eons on how to array the perfect buddha-land, he then made a great series of forty-eight vows, and through his great merit, created the realm of Sukhāvatī ("Ultimate Bliss").

Charles B. Jones describes some of the most important elements of these vows as follows:

this buddha-land will be accessible to all beings who aspire to be reborn there even for "ten moments of thought" (vow 18), cultivate all virtues (vow 19), and, upon hearing his future buddha-name Amitābha, dedicate the merit of their practices to gaining rebirth (vow 20). He will personally appear to such beings at the moment of death (vow 19). Once born in his buddha-land, they will have many of the abilities and bodily features of a fully awakened buddha, such as the divine eye, the divine ear, and the ability to read others' minds (vows 6, 7, 8), and the 32 bodily marks of a buddha (vow 21). The requirements that beings first perfect all virtues and attain such abilities and features before gaining rebirth might lead one to think that they are effectively buddhas upon arrival, but other vows make clear that the purpose of rebirth in this buddha-land is the acquisition of buddhahood. Beings born there are promised limitless time to practice (vow 15), they will never perish and revert to a lower rebirth (vow 2), and they will assuredly achieve buddhahood(vow 11). The land itself is to be so clear and pure that it perfectly reflects all other world systems (vow 31). All the accoutrements of the land will be so finely wrought as to be unperceivable (vow 27), and the land itself, with all its trees and buildings, will be adorned with all seven kinds of brilliant jewel (vow 32).

The sutra then states that Amitabha has achieved Buddhahood and hence these vows have been fulfilled. It also describes in detail the nature of the "Land of Peace and Bliss", its beauty, magnificence and comfortable features, as well as the way that the various features of the land teach the Dharma to all beings there.

The longer sutra also mentions that beings with little attainment or virtue can reach the Pure Land, and states that how and where they will be born once inside the Pure Land is correlated with their level of attainment. Only those who have committed the Five Heinous Deeds or have slandered the dharma are barred from the Pure Land according to the long sutra.

==== Other important sutras ====
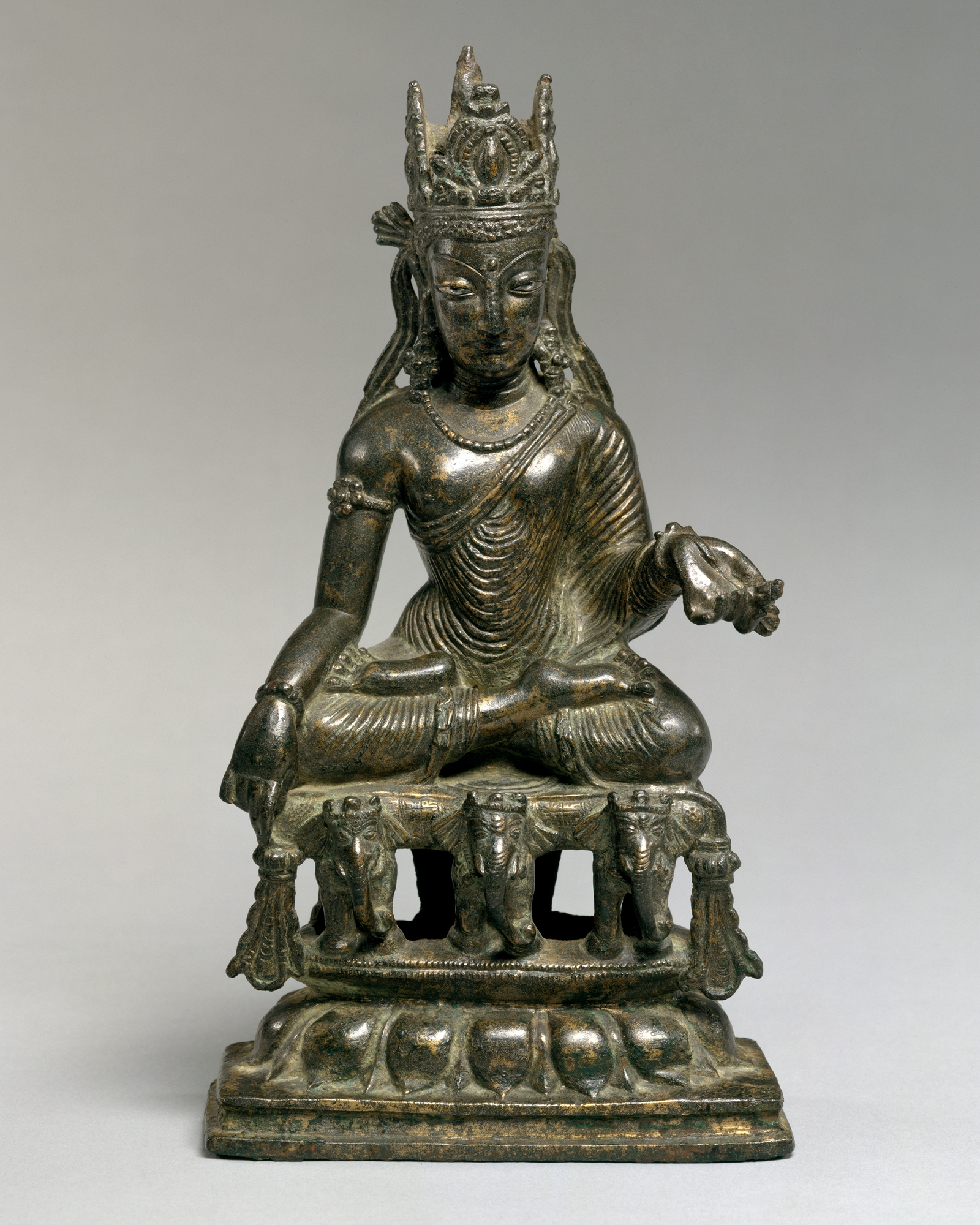
Bronze sculpture of Aksobhya Buddha, Pakistan (Northwest Frontier Province, Swat Valley), 9th century

The Akṣobhya-vyūha is the main source for the tradition of the Buddha Akṣobhya and his buddhafield of Abhirati. It is also one of the earliest known Mahayana sutras. According to this sutra, Akṣobhya took various vows to follow the path to Buddhahood many aeons ago. Due to the great merit generated by these vows for countless lifetimes, Akṣobhya was able to create a purified buddha-field, a peaceful and blissful place where there is no misery, hunger, or pain and where all beings accomplish the ten good actions. Nattier notes that this sutra does not recommend Buddhahood for all beings in Abhirati, instead some are striving for Arhatship and will attain it there. Also, in this sutra, bodhisattvas do not attain Buddhahood in Abhirati, instead, they advance on the path until ready and then they are born in another world which lacks the Buddhadharma to attain Buddhahood there.

Akṣobhya and his buddha-field are also discussed in the Aṣṭasāhasrikā Prajñāpāramitā Sūtra, and the descriptions in this sutra match that of the Akṣobhya-vyūha. Nattier notes that this buddha-field is similar to our world system, with a human realm, heaven realms and a buddha-realm. However, it lacks the three lower realms and there is little suffering even in the human realm, which is a peaceful place without any need to work nor buying or selling, since food magically appears to those who need it.

According to the Akṣobhya-vyūha, attaining rebirth in Abhirati is difficult. Nattier notes that "a tremendous amount of merit is required", and conversely, no specific devotional act towards Akṣobhya is required. One must cultivate the proper roots of merit and purify one's conduct. Those who wish to be born in Abhirati should vow to be reborn there, dedicate all their merit to be reborn in Abhirati, not be selfish, learn meditation and meet with holy people. They should practice visualizing the Buddhas in their buddha-fields and vow to be like them.

The Vimalakīrti Sutra is a text which mainly focuses on wisdom, but it includes various discussions the nature of our world (which is Śākyamuni's buddha-field), and how it appears impure and yet is pure. This discussion was widely quoted by later Chinese Pure Land sources. The sutra also contains a chapter in which Akṣobhya's buddha-field plays a key role. The Vimalakīrti Sutra states that the purification of a buddha-land happens through the purification of our minds: "if the bodhisattva wishes to acquire a pure land, he must purify his mind. When the mind is pure, the buddha-land will be pure". When the Buddha's disciple Śāriputra questions the nature of this world which appears defiled, the Buddha states that it only appears impure to certain beings since their minds are impure. The Buddha then touches the ground with his toe and the whole world appears in a beautiful and radiant way to Śāriputra. The Buddha then states that his Buddha-field has always been pure.

In contrast to this view, the Nirvana Sutra states that Buddha Śākyamuni has his own Pure Land which is not this world, but is many worlds away and is called "Unsurpassable" (無勝). The Buddha manifests from this Pure Land into our world in order to teach the Dharma.

The Bhaiṣajyaguru Sūtra briefly describes the buddhafield of the Buddha Bhaiṣajyaguru (Medicine Guru), the Buddha of healing, as well as the vows that he made as a bodhisattva. His buddhafield is similar to Akṣobhya's, without pain and totally clean and beautiful. The sutra may have been composed outside of India (perhaps Central Asia) and later introduced into the subcontinent. This Buddha became quite popular in East Asia due to the belief that he could cure disease and enhance longevity.

The Mañjuśrībuddhakṣetraguṇavyūha discusses the future buddha-field of Mañjuśrī.

==== In Mahayana treatises ====
Teachings and practices related to buddha-fields are discussed in various Mahayana treatises, including some that have been attributed to Indian masters like Nāgārjuna and Vasubandhu. A text attributed to Nagarjuna, the Dasabhumikavibhāsā (十住毘婆沙論, T.1521) which only exists in Chinese, contains a chapter which states that there are many gates to Buddhist practice and that the easy path is that of being constantly mindful of the Buddhas, especially Amitabha. This chapter (number 9, "Chapter on Easy Practice") which focuses on how birth in Amitābha's Pure Land is a relatively easier path to follow was widely quoted by East Asian Pure Land authors. The authorship of this text has been disputed by some scholars, including Akira Hirakawa.

The Indian Yogacara master Asanga also discusses the idea of rebirth in a buddha-field in his Mahāyānasaṃgraha. According to Asanga, sutra statements which say that one may be reborn in a buddha-field by simply wishing to or by simply reciting a Buddha's name should not be taken literally. Instead, the Buddha's intent in saying such things was to encourage the lazy and indolent that were not capable of practicing the Dharma properly.

Another Yogacara master, Asanga's brother Vasubandhu, is credited with the authorship of the short Verses of Aspiration: An Upadeśa on the Amitāyus Sūtra (無量壽經優婆提舍願生偈, T.1524) which is a commentary on the shorter Sukhāvatīvyūha which describes a five part practice which may have been used as a visualization meditation ritual. Williams notes that the authorship of this work by Vasubadhu is questioned by some modern scholars. The text is known for its focus on faith or trust.

The Dà zhìdù lùn (Great discourse on the Perfection of Wisdom, T.1509), translated by Kumārajīva and his team of scholars, is a large commentarial work on the Perfection of Wisdom. Its 92nd section (juǎn) is entitled "Chapter on Purifying a Buddha-field" and contains much discussion on the nature of buddha-fields and how to attain rebirth there.

==== Esoteric Pure Land sources ====
There are numerous sources which teach the goal of rebirth in Amida's Pure Land of Sukhāvatī which have been categorized as "esoteric Buddhist" works. Scholars like Aaron Proffitt have developed the category "Esoteric Pure Land" to describe this Mahayana orientation. Proffitt references numerous exemplary sources which teach dhāraṇī practice with the goal of rebirth in Sukhāvatī, including texts like *Anantamukha-dhāraṇī (無量門微密持經, T. 1011), and the Puṣpakūṭa-dhāraṇī (華積陀羅尼神呪經, T. 1356).

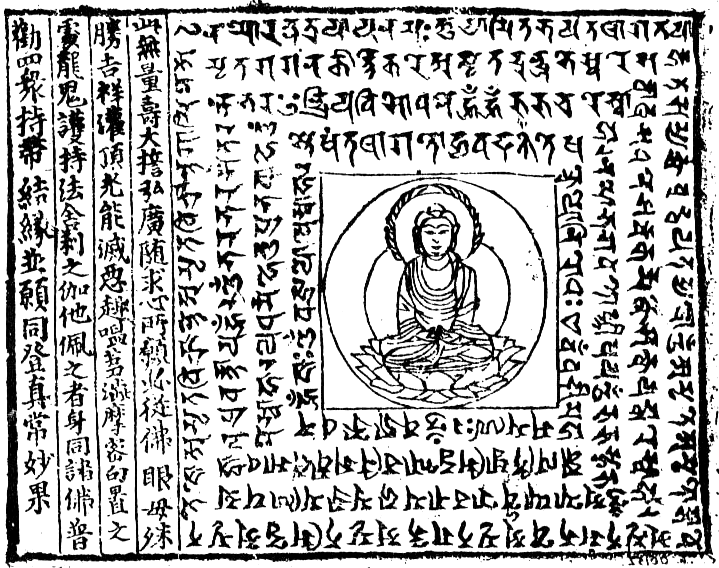
Engraving of the Fundamental Dhāraṇī of Amitāyus Tathāgata, from Dunhuang.

One significant class of these Esoteric Pure Land works are Avalokiteśvara focused texts like Qing Guanshiyin pusa xiaofu duhai tuoluonizhou jing (請觀世音菩薩消伏 毒害陀羅尼呪經, T. 1043) which teaches om mani padme hum as a Pure Land practice, the Shiyimian Guanshiyin shenzhou jing (十一面觀世音神咒經, T. 1070) which applies the Ekādaśamukha-dhāraṇī to the same goal, and the Qianshou qianyan Guanshiyin pusa guang dayuanman wuai dabeixin tuoluonijing (T. 1060) which relies on the Nīlakaṇṭha dhāraṇī. A similar group of texts which also combine dhāraṇī with rebirth in the Pure Land are Uṣṇīsavijayā dhāraṇī texts such as Foding zunsheng tuoluoni jing (佛頂尊勝陀羅尼經, T. 967), and the Foding zunsheng tuoluoni jing (佛頂尊勝陀羅尼經, T. 971) translated by Yijing (635–713). According to Proffitt, the Dhāraṇī-saṃgraha-sūtra, translated by the central Asian monk Atikūṭa (c. 652), "contains a lengthy section dealing with rebirth in Sukhāvatī and a variety of esoteric techniques associated with Amitābha". The text also discusses rebirth in the Pure Lands of other Buddhas and bodhisattvas. Yet another early and popular dharani associated with Amitabha is the Viśuddhaprabhā Dhāraṇī.

"Esoteric Pure Land" texts continued to be translated and composed well into the period of mature Buddhist tantra. 8th century Esoteric Buddhist masters like Vajrabodhi and Amoghavajra were all associated with translating esoteric texts that promoted rebirth in Sukhāvatī and other buddhafields. For example, Vajrabodhi's Qijuzhifomu zhuntidaming tuoluoni jing (七倶胝佛母准提大明陀羅尼經, T. 1075) associated with Cundi and Amoghavajra's Wuliangshou rulai guanxing gongyang yigui (無量壽如來觀行供養儀軌, T. 930), focused around the Fundamental Dhāraṇī of Amitāyus Tathāgata both promise rebirth in Sukhāvatī.

== China ==
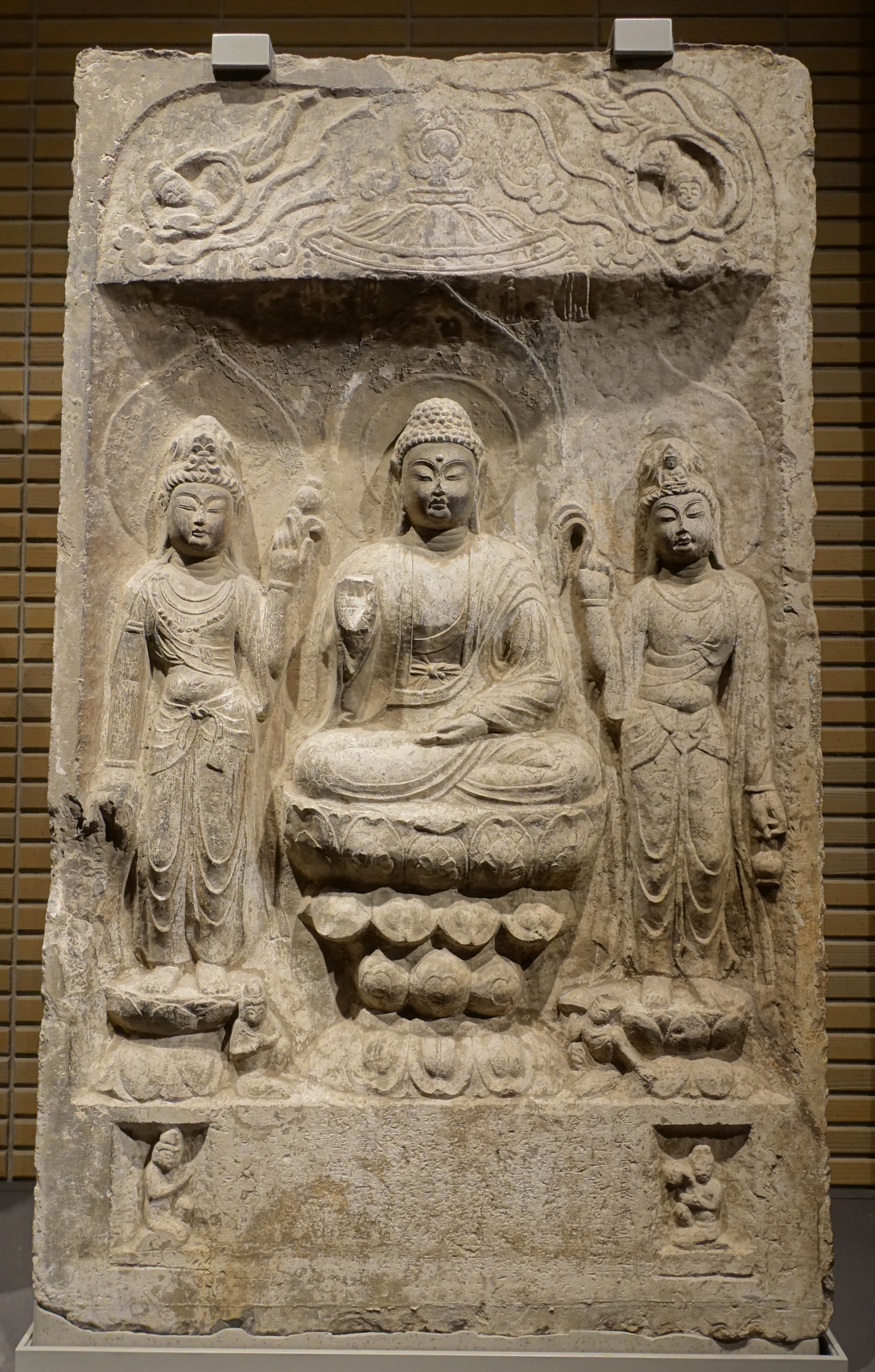
Amitabha triad in a niche, Baoqingsi temple, Xi'an, Shaanxi province, China, Tang dynasty, dated 703 CE

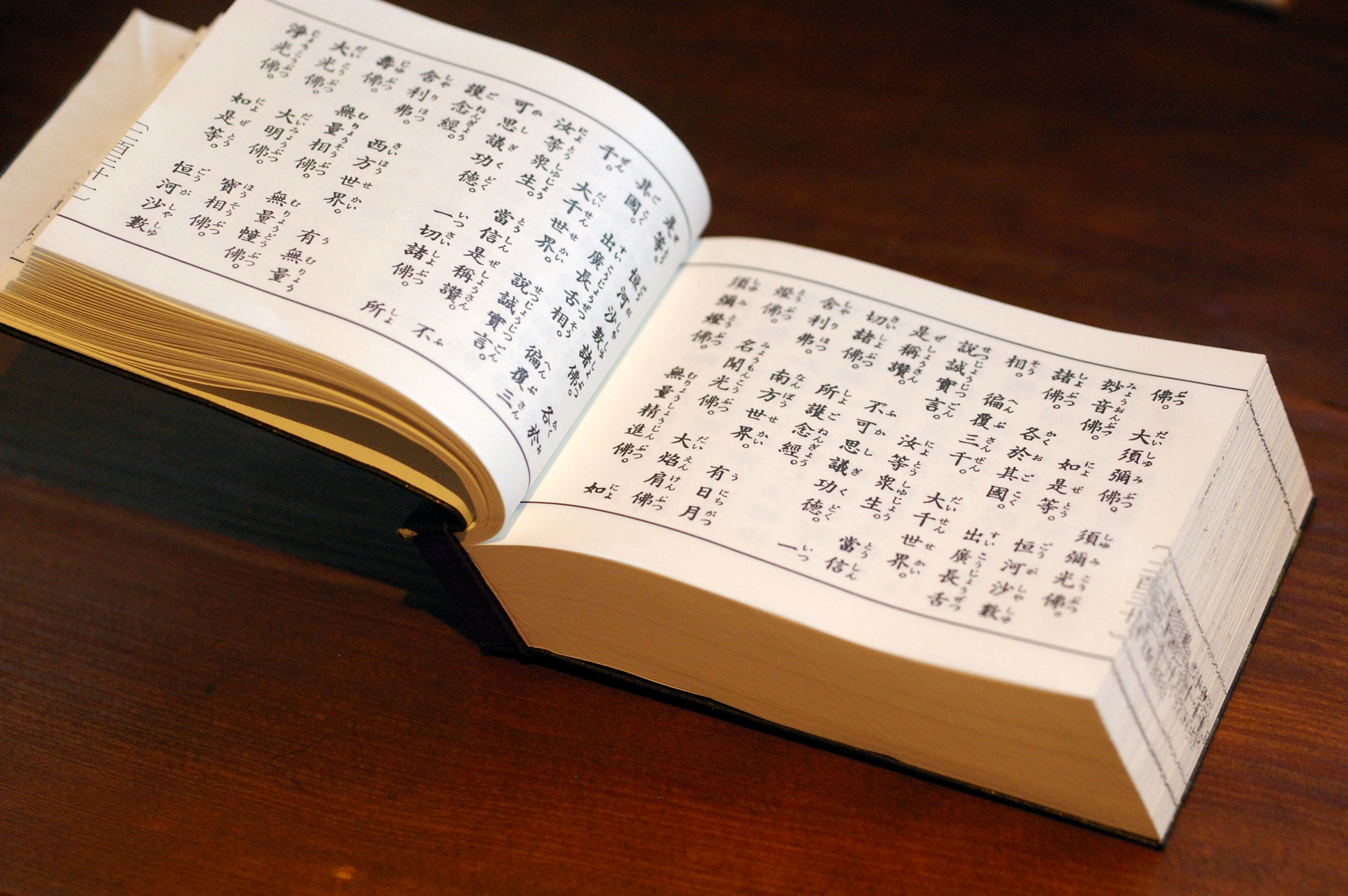
Book open at the Chinese version of the Shorter Sukhāvatīvyūha Sūtra with Japanese annotations

=== Pure Land Sutras ===
The Mahayana Sutras which teach Pure Land methods were brought from the Gandhāra region to China as early as 147 CE, when the Indo-Kushan monk Lokakṣema began translating the first Buddhist sūtras into Chinese. They include the Akṣobhya-vyūha (on the buddhafield of Buddha Akṣohhya) and the Pratyutpanna Samādhi Sūtra (which discusses the buddhafield of Amitabha). The earliest of these translations show evidence of having been translated from the Gāndhārī language, a Prakrit. There are also images of Amitābha with the bodhisattvas Avalokiteśvara and Mahāsthāmaprāpta which were made in Gandhāra during the Kushan era.

One of the earliest Chinese followers of Amitabha was Zhi Dun (314–366), a Neo-Daoist scholar turned Buddhist monk. One of his eulogies expresses his faith in Amitabha Buddha and the Pure Land.

Somewhat later, the Kuchan master Kumārajīva (344–413 CE) translated the Smaller Sukhāvatī-vyūha (T 366) and other Chinese translators also rendered the Longer Sukhāvatīvyūha Sūtra into Chinese, the most popular being Buddhabhadra's c. 359–429 CE. Over time, the three principal sūtras for the Chinese Pure Land tradition became the Longer The Amitāyus Sutra, Amitāyus Contemplation Sūtra and the Shorter Amitābha Sūtra.

Regarding the Amitayurdhyana Sutra (Guan-wuliangshou-jing, Sutra on the Visualization of [the Buddha] Immeasurable Life), modern scholars now consider it to be a Chinese composition. No Sanskrit original has been discovered, no Tibetan translations exists and the text also shows Chinese influences, including references to earlier translations of Chinese Pure Land texts. Modern scholars generally accept that the text describes a meditation which was practiced in Central Asia, but with Chinese additions.

These sutras (the Long and Short Sukhāvatīvyūhas and the Contemplation Sutra) are seen as the three main "pure land sutras" in East Asian Buddhism and they are the main sutra sources for Pure Land doctrine. Pure Land Patriarch Daochuo was one of the first figures to discuss a set of "Sutras advocating rebirth in the Pure Land" in chapter 8 of his Anleji. Daochuo lists the main Pure Land Sutras as well as The Sutra of Rebirth in the Ten Directions According to Vows (十方随願往生経) and the Ten Ways of Rebirth Sutra (佛說十往生阿彌陀佛國經 X0014). Similarly, Patriarch Shandao's Gate of Contemplative Recollection cites "six sutras of birth in the Pure Land," which consist of the three Pure Land Sutras as well as: the Pratyutpanna Samādhi Sūtra, The Sutra on the Samādhi of Liberation through Purification (淨度三昧經) and the Ten Ways of Rebirth Sutra.

In contemporary Chinese Pure Land, the three Pure land sutras are combined with two more sutra chapters, and a treatise to form a canon of six foundational Pure Land texts. The other three sources are:

- The Chapter of the Practices and Vows of Bodhisattva Samantabhadra from the Avatamsaka Sutra
- The Chapter on the Perfect and Complete Realization of Mahasthamaprapta from the Surangama Sutra
- Vasubandhu's Discourse on the Pure Land (浄土論), also known as The Rebirth Treatise (往生論).

In addition to these sutras and treatise, many other Mahāyāna texts also feature Amitābha, and a total of 290 such works have been identified in the Taishō Tripiṭaka.

=== Early period ===
The Pure Land teachings first became prominent in China with the founding of Donglin Temple at Mount Lu by Huiyuan in 402. As a young man, Huiyuan practiced Daoism, but felt the theories of immortality to be vague and unreliable, and unrepresentative of the ultimate truth. Instead, he turned to Buddhism and became a monk under Dao'an. Later he founded a monastery at the top of Mount Lu and invited well-known literati to study and practice Buddhism there, where they formed the White Lotus Society. He also corresponded with Kumārajīva.

Huiyuan and the Mount Lu community focused on the practice of mindfulness of the Buddha Amitabha as taught in the Pratyutpanna Samādhi Sūtra. Huiyuan mainly practiced this method so as to develop samadhi and have a vision of the Buddha Amitābha in the present life and receive teachings from him. The members of the White Lotus also vowed to help each other reach "the spirit realm" or "the west". Today, Mount Lu is regarded as being among the most sacred religious sites of the Pure Land Buddhist tradition, and the site of the first Pure Land gathering.

However, scholars like Charles B. Jones have questioned whether Huiyuan was actually interested in nianfo practice as a way to gain rebirth in the Pure Land. He notes that his letters to Kumārajīva have no mention of this goal and that Huiyuan's biography in the Gāo sēng zhuàn (Biographies of eminent monks, T.2059, circa 519) do not name or describe the Pure Land of Sukhavati using classic Buddhist descriptions one finds in the sutras. Instead, this "spirit realm" shows Daoist influences. Hence, Jones does not see Huiyuan as being an actual devotee of Pure Land Buddhism, but instead as simply a Buddhist who practiced nianfo. Huiyuan did praise nianfo, and he is recorded as saying that "the nianfo samadhi is preeminent for height of merit and ease of practice." Whatever the case, during the later course of Pure Land Buddhism, Huiyan began to be seen as a patriarch of Pure Land Buddhism who had achieved rebirth in the Pure Land and had visions of Amitabha.

Another influential figure during this time was the Dilun school master Jingying Huiyuan (523–592), the first Chinese author to write commentaries to the Amitayus Sutra and the Contemplation Sutra. His commentaries remained influential in later times. Huiyuan labeled the Pure Land teaching of the Contemplation Sutra “the dharma wheel of the sudden teaching” since it allows ordinary people to enter the stage of non-retrogression.

The practice of mindfulness of the Buddha was also taught by the very influential figure of Tiantai Buddhism, Zhiyi (538–597). His Mohe Zhiguan teaches the Constantly Walking Samadhi (常行三昧) which is based on the Pratyutpanna Samādhi Sūtra. This practice entails circumambulating an altar while visualizing a detailed image of Amitabha and sonorously reciting the name Amitabha while also working to realize the empty nature of the visualization. This practice was done for ninety days. In a similar fashion, the key patriarchs who established the Huayan tradition, Zhiyan, and Fazang, both vowed to be reborn in Amitabha's Pure Land, seeing it as a skillful initial step on the path to Vairocana's Lotus Treasury world.

The rise in popularity of Pure Land Buddhism may have been due to the popular idea that human beings were becoming incapable of practicing the Buddha Dharma properly since the world was entering into a decadent or latter age of the Dharma. According to this view, humans need the help of Amitābha Buddha to reach awakening, since in our time, the classic bodhisattva path is just too difficult. Pure land ideas thus gave people hope in a difficult world and made the Buddhist path seem relatively easier than the classic Mahayana bodhisattva path which was held to last for countless aeons (kalpas). Another possible reason why this tradition grew in popularity in China was that it addressed an important Chinese concern, the search for immortality (the name of the Buddha Amitayus means "Immeasurable Life").

According to Charles B. Jones, early Pure Land authors in China discussed and debated three different views on the Pure Land: (1) ordinary people could be born in Sukhāvatī, (2) only advanced bodhisattvas could reach Sukhāvatī, (3) Pure Land practitioners attained whatever kind of land corresponded to the purity of their minds. Over time, view 1 won out over the others, so much so that according to Jones, the most essential element of the Pure Land teaching in China is the very idea that non-elite common folk could attain the highest Buddhist goals through simple practices based on Amitabha. This movement was widely embraced by ordinary laypersons. It received a mixed response from the Chinese Buddhist community at large and led to generations of Pure land writings and apologetics.

=== Tanluan and Daochuo ===
Before the 7th century, the archeological evidence is quite small for the worship of Amitabha in China. Williams notes that there was very little devotion to Amitabha in China during the third and fourth centuries. However, during the 7th century, there were over 144 images of Amitabha and Avalokitesvara erected in China. According to Williams, "these changes occur during the collective lifetimes of Tanluan, Daochuo (Tao-ch’o; 562–645), and Shandao (Shan- tao; 613–681)."

The Pure Land teachings and meditation methods based on mindfulness of the Buddha (reciting the name of Amitābha and visualizing his form), quickly spread throughout China due to the work of figures like these three patriarchs. It is also in the writings of these patriarchs that the idea that ordinary people could reach the Pure Land of Amitabha was promoted and defended through reliance on classic Buddhist doctrine.

The first patriarch is Tanluan, known for his commentary on the *Sukhavativyuhopadesa. Tanluan was skeptical about the possibility of spiritual growth at the time that he lived. He argues that it is too difficult now to practice the bodhisattva path relying on one's own power (or self-power, through study and meditation) and instead one needed to rely on "other power", that is the power of a Buddha like Amitabha. According to Tanluan, through faith in this other power, one can attain enlightenment relatively easily. Tanluan describes a detailed meditation of visualizing the Buddha Amitabha and reciting his name with sincere faith. He saw the name of the Buddha as a kind of spell which has the power to connect us with the wisdom of the Buddha and his inconceivable realm (acintya-dhātu).

This practice has the power to purify the mind of all evil tendencies, since it calls on the power of Amitabha Buddha. Thus, even the worst of persons can be saved through this method. According to Tanluan, once one reaches the Pure Land and achieve awakening there, one's purpose must be to manifest in this world as bodhisattvas in order to help others. Tanluan cites over twenty sutras and over a dozen treatises in his main commentary, including eighty one references to the Mahāprajñāpāramitāupadeśa and twenty one to the work of Sengchao. Tanluan preached his Pure Land doctrine, which had great potential for mass appeal, to monastics, laypeople, Buddhists and non-Buddhists.

The next major influence on Chinese Pure Land was Daochuo, who wrote a work defending Pure land from its critics. Daochuo promoted the view that the world was entering the "last days of the Dharma" (末法). In this era, the "path of the sages" (shèngdào) which relies on classic Buddhist self-development and on "self-power" (自力), was not feasible or effective. Instead the most effect method now was "to repent our sins, to cultivate virtues, and to utter the Buddha's name" and thus to leave this defiled world for the Pure Land. Daochuo called this "the way of rebirth in the Pure Land" (往生淨土) and associated it with the "other power" (他力) of Amitabha. In responding to critics of Pure Land Buddhism, Daochuo said that the Pure Land was a conventional truth, a skillful means taught by the Buddhas for the benefit of sentient beings. Daochuo also held that those who had heard the Pure Land teachings had already cultivated good roots of merit in past lives as well as bodhicitta, thus they already had the necessary merit to attain the Pure Land. Thus, in his view, reaching the Pure Land required a certain amount of merit.

=== Shandao and Huaigan ===
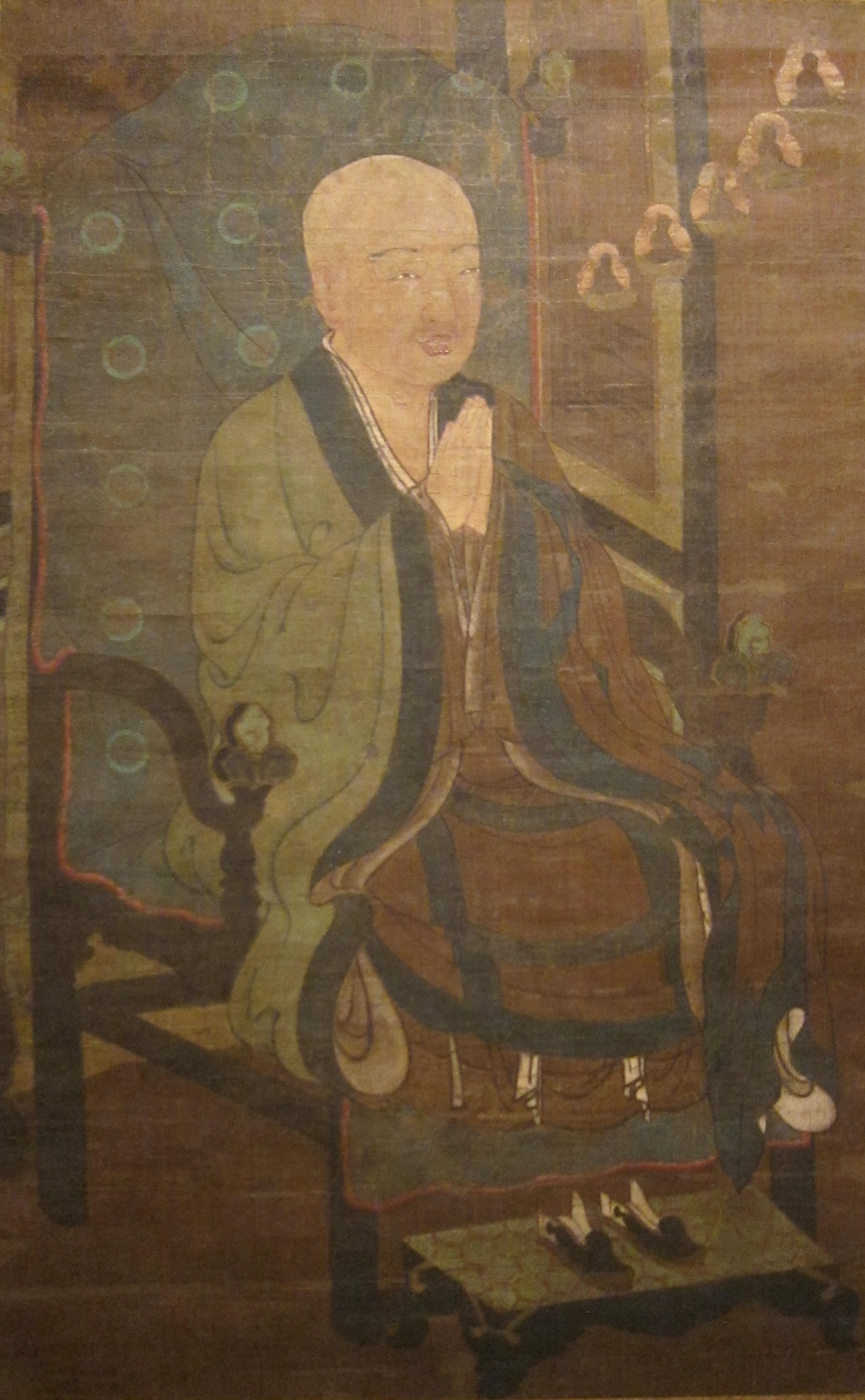
Japanese portrait of Shandao Dashi (Jp: Zendo Daishi), Nanbokucho period, 14th century.

Shandao (7th century) was a student of Daochuo who lived in the ancient capital of Chang’an and focused on spreading the Pure Land teachings among ordinary people (instead of at court). He is said to have had many followers and to have distributed numerous sutras and paintings of the Pure land (which he painted himself). According to Jones, Shandao is the true founder of the Pure Land tradition. This is because, according to Jones, "while Tanluan and Daochuo provided some of the necessary conceptual pieces and served as exemplars, it was Shandao who stated clearly and fully that ordinary beings can attain rebirth in the Pure Land through the power of Amitābha's vow."

Shandao wrote a large four volume commentary to the Amitayurdhyana Sutra, which he held was taught for the benefit of the common folk (which he sees as exemplified by the character of queen Videhi and in himself). To attain the Pure Land, one must have a deep, sincere trust in Amitabha and deeply desire to be reborn in the Pure Land and then perform the five forms of religious practice. Reciting the name of Amitabha is the main practice, which is supported by the auxiliary practices of chanting the Pure Land sutras, visualization and meditation on Amitabha, worshiping and bowing to Amitabha and praising and making offerings to Amitabha. These practices led to birth in the Pure land, as well as to meditative absorption (samadhi) and visions of Amitabha in this life. While Shandao taught these auxiliary practices, he also held that reciting Amitabha's name ten times was sufficient for rebirth in the pure land.

Jones notes that it was Shandao who promoted the centrality of the oral recitation of Amitabha's name as the main Pure Land practice (which he connected with the term nian), previous patriarchs had not focused on this aspect and had interpreted nian differently. Jones notes that the term niàn 念 can mean both contemplate and recite. Another important doctrinal development of Shandao was the idea that the power of Amitabha's vows not only established the Pure Land, but also caused even the most depraved beings to be reborn there. Previous patriarchs like Tanluan had only held that Amitabha's power merely created the Pure Land, where beings would be reborn according to their own merit and bodhicitta. Shandao meanwhile wrote that it was "entirely due to the power of Amitābha's vows" that someone could attain rebirth in Sukhavati, which also appeared equally as a sambhoghakaya (reward body) to all beings, no matter how depraved they were.

Shandao's disciple, Huaigan (d. 699) was also an important figure in his own right. According to Jones, Huaigan's apologetic Treatise explaining a number of doubts about Pure Land (釋淨土群疑論, T.1960) "added a great deal of philosophical depth to Shandao's basic framework." The work explains how the power of the Buddha can override individual's negative karma and allow them to see the purity of the Pure Land and be reborn there among the lower grades of beings. He does not reject the more elite and high level practices and attainments (and the idea that they lead to higher ranks in the Pure Land) but he also argues for the idea that even the most defiled people will also enter the Pure Land as part of those of the lowest grade (of rebirth forms), as explained in the Amitayus Contemplation Sutra.

Another influential text written during the time of Huaigan was the Discourse on ten doubts about Pure Land (淨土十疑論, T.1961). This text was attributed to Zhiyi, but cannot be by him according to Jones and it betrays the influence of Huaigan's ideas as well as those of Tanluan and Daochuo.

=== Principles ===
In China, Pure Land practices were always historically viewed as a practice or method that could be integrated together with the teachings and practices of other Buddhist traditions. As such, many modern scholars argue that no independent Pure Land "school" or "clan" (宗) existed in China, and it was regarded and practiced as an integral part of other "schools" such as Tiantai, Vinaya and Chan.

According to Charles B. Jones, the Pure Land was most often described in pre-modern Chinese sources as a "dharma-gate" (法門), meaning a path or way of practice. When the term zōng was used, it did not refer to an institution, but to the "cardinal tenet" of Pure Land teaching. Some Chinese Buddhists might have used Pure Land practice as their main or only practice, while for others it could be a subsidiary method.

Pure Land cosmology, soteriology, and ritual were always part-and-parcel of Chinese Buddhism in general and Chan monasticism in particular. The modern conception of an independent and self-conscious Chinese Pure Land historical "school" with its own patriarchate and teachings, and the associated notion of Chan/Pure Land syncretism, have been influenced by the work of Japanese Buddhist studies scholars and the enduring legacy of Japanese sectarian disputes over Chinese Patriarchs. In reality, Pure Land and Chan/Zen practice were historically and still often seen as being mutually compatible, and no strong distinctions are made. Chinese Buddhists have traditionally viewed the practice of meditation and the practice of reciting Amitābha Buddha's name, as complementary and even analogous methods for achieving enlightenment. This is because they view recitation as a meditation method used to concentrate the mind and purify thoughts. Chinese Buddhists widely consider this form of recitation as a very effective form of meditation practice.

Historically, Buddhist teachers in China have taken eclectic approaches in their practice by teaching various Buddhist schools of thought concurrently (including Pure Land and Chan), without emphasizing any strict sectarian delineation between them. For example, prominent monastics such as Tanluan were recorded as having written commentaries on non-Pure Land related scriptures, and there is little evidence of them having advocated for Pure Land as an independent "school" of Buddhism. Another example is Hanshan Deqing and many of his contemporaries who advocated the dual practice of the Chan and Pure Land methods, advocating mindfulness of Amitābha to purify the mind for the attainment of self-realization.

=== Post-Shandao developments ===
According to Yangjong Chen, the key teachings of Tanluan, Daochuo, and Shandao comprised the mainstream of Chinese Pure Land during the Tang Dynasty. Three main streams of Pure Land Buddhism developed in the post-Shandao era. All of them were influenced by the mainstream Pure Land teaching while also developing it in different directions. They are:

- The Shandao lineage: Centered around Chang'an and the surrounding capital region. This lineage focused on recitative nianfo and followed Shandao's teaching most closely. It included Shandao's direct disciples like Huaigan and Huaiyun (懷惲, 640–701) who founded Xiangji Temple. It also includes later figures who were inspired by Shandao, like Daxing and his students (who authored the Mirror of Nianfo 念佛鏡 T.1966) and Wulong Shaokang (called the "Later Shandao"). This was the dominant stream according to Yangjong Chen and focused on single-minded recitation of the name of Amitabha.
- Cimin's linage which was based on a comprehensive Mahayana practice influenced by Cimin's trip to India
- The Huiyuan lineage which focused on contemplative nianfo. This line included figures like Jiacai, Feixi, and Fazhao, who revered Lushan Huiyuan of Mount Lu's Donglin Temple.

The "Huiyuan" lineage begins with the work of Jiacai. As Yangjong Chen notes, while his lineage revered Huiyuan as patriarch, its teachings were a continuation of the mainstream teachings of Tanluan and Daochuo, with an emphasis on contemplative practice. Jiacai was a Pure Land monk of Hongfa Monastery in Chang'an during the reign of Emperor Gaozong of Tang (r.649 - 683). As such, he lived at around the same time as Shandao. Both inherited Daochuo's legacy, were active in the same place at the same time, and yet they seem to have been unaware of each other. Jiacai compiled various Pure Land works and composed the Treatise on the Pure Land (Jingtu Lun) in three fascicles, which teaches that nianfo practice should primarily focus on contemplation. Jiacai was also the first author to promote Huiyuan as a Pure Land ancestor.

Another important post-Shandao figure is Cimin Huiri (c. 680–74), who is known to have traveled overland to India. Cimin's Pure Land teaching combined teachings (jiao), meditation (chan), precepts (jie), and Pure Land (jing) into a comprehensive system. Cimin was considered by Hōnen to be the source of a separate lineage of Pure Land Buddhism, the Cimin lineage (which Hōnen saw as distinct from the Shandao lineage and the Huiyuan lineage). Cimin also defended Pure Land Buddhism from the critiques of Chan masters that argued that all we needed to do was practice meditation. Cimin's main defense of Pure Land is found in his Collection Outlining Various Scriptures and Treatises Regarding Methods of Contemplating the Buddha and Rebirth in the Pure Land. For Cimin, Chan masters who criticized Pure Land were arrogant unawakened people who falsely claimed enlightenment and denied basic Buddhist teaching and scriptures in favor of their own narrow focus on meditation. In contrast, Cimin recommended "nien-fo, scripture chanting, and invocation of the bodhisattvas, in addition to vegetarianism," as a basic structure of Pure Land practice.

One of Cimin's students was Chengyuan (713–802), an influential Pure Land master who resided at Mount Heng (Hunan) who would later be seen as a patriarch of the school. Fazhao (died c. 820) was a student of Chengyuan who popularized Pure land at the Imperial court and received the title of national teacher (Guoshi) from Emperor Daizong. Fazhao became known for standardizing the Chinese classic chant of na-mo a-mi-tuo fo ("adoration [or prostration] to Amitabha Buddha'), which came to be known as the "nianfo". He also established Zhulin Monastery at Mount Wutai where he developed a Pure Land ritual known as the Five Assemblies Dharma Service Ritual (Wuhui Fashi Yi). In practice, the ritual focuses on chanting "Amitabha Buddha" using five types of vocal tones and tempos

Another key figure in the Pure Land - Chan debate was Feixi (8th century). His works, such as Treatise on the Contemplation of the Buddha as the Jewel King of Meditation (念佛三昧寶王論 T 1967), are more accommodating to the Chan perspective than Cimin's. He cites the Lotus Sutra's chapter on Never Disparaging Bodhisattva (whose attitude is that we should see all beings as future Buddhas and never disparage any of them) as a conciliatory text which leads to his more friendly attitude to Chan. Feixi also attempts to argue for the unity of the practice of the Pure Land nianfo method and the Chan doctrine of no-mind by using the classic Huayan doctrine of principle and phenomena. Feixi's method involved "using the mind of nien-fo to enter into the patience based on the insight of non-arising." This method is also based on the power of the Buddha, whose activity allows the Pure Land practitioner to enter the realm of ultimate principle.

=== From the Song to the Qing ===
During the Tang and Song dynasties (960–1279), as Pure Land Buddhism grew in popularity, the Tiantai school worked to integrate these teachings into its tradition, and Tiantai monks were pivotal in the spreading of Pure Land practice. Some of the key Pure Land figures of the Tang were affiliated with Tiantai, including Chengyuan (712–802) and the aforementioned Fazhao. Tiantai authors also wrote various Pure Land texts and commentaries during the Tang. Five different Tiantai Pure Land works were written in the Tang and apocryphally attributed to Zhiyi: the Jingtu-shiyilun 淨土十 疑論 (Ten Doubts concerning the Pure Land), Guan-wuliangshou-fojing-shu 觀無量壽佛經疏 (A commentary on the Contemplation Sutra), Amituojingyiji 阿彌陀經義記 (Commentary on the Amida Sutra), Wufangbian-nianfamen 五方便念佛門 (The Five Expedient Nianfo Gates), and the Xifang-jingyeyi 西方淨業義 (Meaning of the Pure Practice of the West).

During the Song, Tiantai monks such as Shengchang (省常, 959–1020), Ciyun Zunshi (慈雲尊式, 964–1032), Gushan Zhiyuan (976–1022) and Siming Zhili (960–1028), were key figures who founded Pure Land societies. Many of these figures also wrote Pure Land works which developed a uniquely Tiantai form of Pure Land thought and practice.

Unlike in the Japanese Pure Land of Shinran and Honen, Chinese Pure Land practice during the Song dynasty was not exclusivistic and was often practiced in tandem with other Buddhist methods and traditions. Yongming Yanshou (904–975) is one of the many figures which taught the unity of Chan Buddhism with Pure Land practice. For Yanshou, the Pure Land and Chan are really both working for the same thing, the pure mind, since the Pure land is just the pure mind (as the Vimalakirti sutra states). Furthermore, for Yanshou, both methods are just ways of cutting self grasping, since the Pure Land abandonment of self-power is none other than the Buddhist teaching of not-self.

Another important figure of the Song was Yuanzhao (1048–1116). A Vinaya master from the Nanshan lineage of the Vinaya school, Yuanzhao later converted to Pure Land Buddhism after an illness and staunchly defended the Pure Land path. He also wrote commentaries on the Contemplation Sutra and the Amitabha Sutra, drawing on the works of previous authors like Ciyun Zunshi and Shandao. Also during the Song, many Pure Land societies modeled on those of the Tiantai masters were founded, and these societies continued to be popular in later dynasties. Some of these met in temples and others had specially constructed "Pure Land halls or White Lotus halls. Mao Ziyuan and Yuanzhao are some important later figures who were associated with Pure land societies.

The Song dynasty also saw the development of Huayan Pure Land in the work of Yuanche Yiche (fl. 1160s CE). His Lamp of the Inexhaustible Nianfo Samadhi argues that birth in the Pure Land is only an intermediate goal achieved through the expedient of nianfo. Once there, one is able to practice the Huayan contemplation and realize the mind of the Dharma-realm, the ultimate wisdom of perfect interpenetration. For Yiche, if one solely seeks rebirth without the proper understanding, one will not obtain good results.

The Song era also saw the development of Pure Land anthologies, large collections of Pure Land works and excerpts. Zongxiao (1151–1214) is one of the earliest compilers of such a work, the five fascicle Lebang Wenlei. Zongxiao's compilation tended to focus on elite practitioners and famous monks, as well as on a mind-only Pure Land perspective. Apart from the Lebang Wenlei, another important Pure Land anthology written during the Song was the twelve fascicle Longshu's Pure Land Writings (Longshu jingtu wen) by Wang Rixiu, a native of Longshu (present-day Shucheng, Anhui). This anthology has a broader scope than the Lebang Wenlei, and includes stories of ordinary people, including cow and pig slaughterers, while also emphasizing vegetarianism and non-harming.

Yet another later Pure Land author was the Yuan dynasty monk Tianru Weize (天如惟則, c. 1286?–1354), who wrote the Questions about Pure Land (淨土或問, T.1972) as a dialogue between a skeptical Chan monk who poses questions about Pure Land practice, saying that it is dualistic. Tianru defends the idea that an evil person can attain the Pure Land at death by arguing that at death, a person's power of concentration becomes very strong and that during this special time, they may repent of their past deeds with complete sincerity.

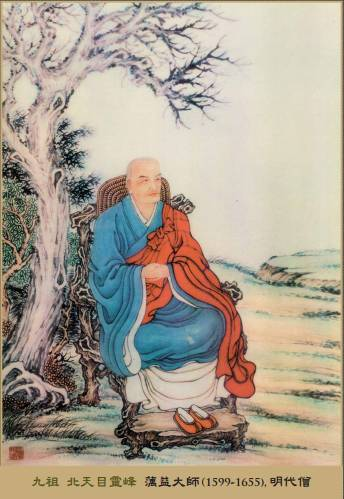
Ouyi Zhixu

A more comprehensive blend of Chan, Pure Land and doctrinal learning (which was associated with schools like Tiantai and Huayan) became popular during the Ming and Qing dynasties. During the Ming, Pure Land Buddhism was widespread among all the types of monasteries and temples. Chan monks as well as monks of other sects also practiced Pure Land. This era also saw the rise of Pure Land-Chan dual cultivation in which both traditions were practiced side by side or blended, as in the "nianfo gong’an" which used the name of Amitabha as a meditation phrase. The teachings of Hanshan Deqing (1546–1623) are one influential example this dual-cultivation tradition.

Ming Pure Land thought is also exemplified by the work of great scholar-monks like Youxi Chuandeng, Yunqi Zhuhong, Ouyi Zhixu and the poet Yuan Hongdao. Their writings are generally non-sectarian, seeing all the Chinese Buddhist traditions as complementary and harmonious. They thus explain Pure Land thought and practice by drawing on all the major intellectual trends of their time, including Yogacara, Huayan, Tiantai and even Neo-Confucianism.

During the Qing dynasty (1644–1912), the influence of the non-sectarian and harmonious Buddhism promoted by Zhuhong and Zhixu was widespread. As such, their non-sectarian and syncretic form of Pure Land became orthodoxy. It was even supported by some of the emperors, like the Yongzheng Emperor (r. 1723–1735), who wrote a preface to the collected works of Zhuhong.

The Qing era also saw various authors continue to develop the Huayan-Pure Land synthesis. The most influential promoters of Huayan-Nianfo were the monk Baiting Xufa (1641–1728) and the lay literatus Peng Shaosheng. These figures generally promoted the practice of nianfo backed by the teachings of the Avatamsaka sutra and Huayan metaphysics. For Peng Shaosheng, Amitabha and Vairocana (the Buddha of the Avatamsaka) were identical, and Sukhavati was likewise identical to Vairocana's Lotus Treasury World.

=== Modern era ===
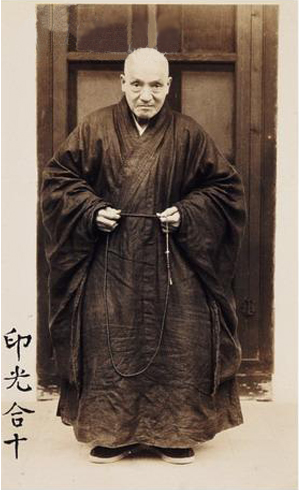
Master Yìnguāng

In modern China, Pure Land practice remains an influential Dharma gate among Chinese Buddhists. Several modern Chinese figures have also promoted Pure Land as a main practice, and even as an independent tradition. Master Yinguang (1861–1941) was particularly influential in the modern revival of Pure Land in mainland China. He was so influential in his own time that he became known as “the pillar and guide of contemporary Pure Land,” and “the builder of Pure Land school”. As such, he was soon recognized as the "thirteen patriarch" of Chinese Pure Land by his contemporaries and followers.

Another key figure in the Pure Land revival was Yang Wenhui (1837–1911). Yang retrieved twelve Chinese Pure Land works from Japan, works that had been lost in China since the Tang Huichang persecution. These included the writings of Shandao, Daochuo and Tanluan. Yang published these works through his Jinling Sutra Publishing House, making these classic Pure Land works available in China once again. He was also well known for promoting and defending the Chinese Pure Land Buddhist tradition. Yet another important promoter of Pure Land practice in the Republican period was Master Hong Yi (1880–1942), the eleventh patriarch of the Nanshan Vinaya school.

Other important figures include Venerable Chin Kung (1927–2022), and Venerable Guang Qin (1892–1986). Another modern Chinese Pure Land teacher is Master Da’an, abbot of Donglin Temple (Jiujiang) at the famous Mount Lu.

One unique Chinese Pure Land organization that has arisen is the Pristine Pure Land School of Dharma Master Huijing (1950–) and Dharma Master Jingzong (1966–, Abbot of Hongyuan Monastery). This tradition focuses exclusively on Pure land study and practice, informed by the works of Shandao.

Another Chinese Pure Land organization that has developed recently is the Hwadzan Pure Land Association based in Taipei. They are known for their online presence and for using the internet as a way to spread the Pure Land teachings.

== Patriarchs ==
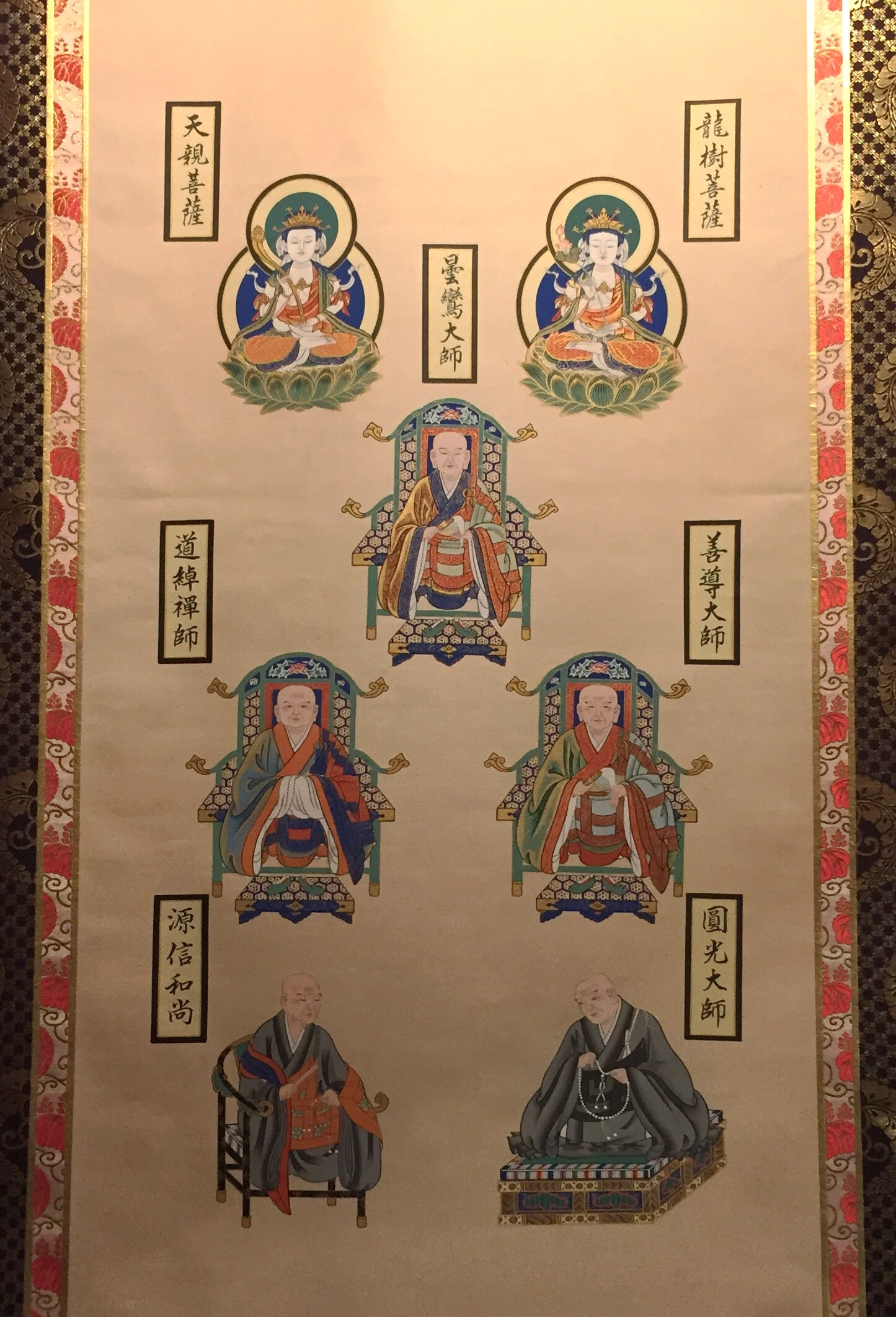
Illustration of the seven ancestors of Jōdo Shinshū

As the Chinese Pure land school (淨土宗) developed its own self conscious identity as a "school" (宗), lists of Chinese pure land "patriarchs" (祖) developed which included later key figures in Chinese Pure Land.

The first widely recognized list of Pure Land patriarchs appears in the Southern Song (1127–1279) in the writings of the Tiantai monk Shizhi Zongxiao (1151–1214) who lists six patriarchs: Huiyuan, Shandao, Fazhao, Shaokang, Xingchang, and Changlu Zongze.

The modern Chinese Pure Land Buddhist tradition following Yinguang's Lianzong shi’er zu zansong (蓮宗十二祖讚頌) recognizes thirteen patriarchs:

1. Huiyuan of Mt. Lu (盧山慧遠, 334–416)
2. Guangming Shandao (光明善導, 613–681)
3. Banzhou Chengyuan (般舟承遠, 713–802)
4. Zhulin Fazhao (竹林法照, ca. 740–838)
5. Wulong Shaokang (烏龍少康, 736–806)
6. Yongming Yanshou (永明延壽, 904–975)
7. Zhaoqing Xingchang (昭慶省常, 959–1020), also romanized Shěngcháng
8. Yunqi Zhuhong (1535–1615), also known as Lianchi (蓮池)
9. Ouyi Zhixu (1599–1655)
10. Puren Xingce (普仁行策, 1626–1682)
11. Sheng'an Shixian (省庵實賢, 1686–1734), also known as Fantian Xing’an (梵天省庵)
12. Jixing Chewu (1741–1810)
13. Lingyan Yinguang (1861–1941)

The Japanese Jōdo-shū school recognizes five patriarchs before Hōnen (which are listed in Hōnen's Senchakushū and Jōdo goso den):

1. Tanluan (476–542)
2. Daochuo (562–645)
3. Shandao (613–681)
4. Huaigan (懷感, 7th century)
5. Wulong Shaokang (736–806)

Meanwhile, Japanese Pure Land Buddhist school of Jodo Shinshu relies on a slightly different list of seven patriarchs (shichiso):

1. Nagarjuna (3rd century)
2. Vasubandhu (4–5th century)
3. Tanluan (476–542)
4. Daochuo (562–645)
5. Shandao (613–681)
6. Genshin (源信, 942–1017)
7. Hōnen (法然, 1133–1212)

Furthermore, for Jodo Shinshu, Shinran is considered to be the final and culminating patriarch of the Pure Land tradition.

== Korea ==
Pure Land thought also made its way into Korean Buddhism from China during the Unified Silla period (668–935). Perhaps the most influential figure in this development was Wŏnhyo (617–686), who widely promoted nianfo practice and wrote ten texts on Pure Land Buddhism, including commentaries on the Pure Land sūtras. Korean practitioners of Pure Land like Wŏnhyo never set out to establish a separate school of Buddhism, instead they saw Pure land practice as part of the larger Mahayana tradition.

In his commentary on the Larger Sutra, Wŏnhyo emphasized that birth in the Pure Land could be attained by relying on the other-power of the compassion (慈悲力, chabiryŏk) of the buddha, rather than by relying on one's own self-power. Thus, like Shandao, Wŏnhyo argued that all living beings, not just bodhisattvas on the bhumis, could attain birth in the Pure Land by relying on the Buddha's power.

In Wŏnhyo's Pure Land writings, he argues that the superior practice of nianfo is the one which is done with bodhicitta and with a repentant, sincere mind (至心, chisim). Indeed, in his Doctrinal Essentials of the Sūtra on the Visualization of Immeasurable Life (無量壽經宗要, Muryangsu-gyŏng chongyo), Wŏnhyo argues that it is bodhicitta which is the primary cause of birth in the Pure land.

Wŏnhyo's Pure Land thought is based on numerous Mahayana sources, including the works of Zhiyi, Tanluan along with Chinese Yogācāra and Tathāgatagarbha thought. Later Silla era Pure Land authors like Pŏbwi, Hyŏnil, Uijŏk, and Kyŏnghŭng all follow Wŏnhyo's synthetic method of interpreting Pure Land by drawing on the broader Mahayana doctrinal tradition. There may have been also been lineage of Pure land praxis based in Hwangnyong Monastery (皇龍寺) which could be traced back to Wŏn’gwang (圓光, c. 540–640), who may have studied under Huiyuan. However, his works are all lost. Chajang may have been another important figure for Korean Pure Land, but his works (including two commentaries on the Amitabha sutra) are also lost. As such, it is in the works of Wŏnhyo that early Korean Pure land ideas can be found and it is his work which influenced all later Korean writings on Pure Land.

Another important figure in Korean Pure Land thought was the Hwaeom founder Uisang (625–702) who wrote a commentary on the Amitabha sutra, The Meaning of the Amituo Jing, (阿彌陀經義記, Amit'a-gyŏng ŭigi). Pure land practice was also an important part of the Cheontae school (Korean Tiantai).

== Japan ==
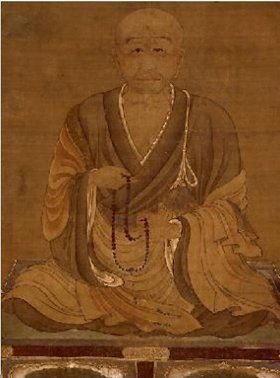
A hanging painting of Genshin holding a mala used in nembutsu recitation (Shōjūraigōji Temple).

Pure Land practice arrived in Japan from China and Korea in around the 7th century. During the Nara period (710–794), several monks taught nianfo (Japanese: nenbutsu) and wrote on Pure Land practice. These included Chikō (709–770 or 781) of the Sanron (Middle Way) school and Zenju (723–797) of the Hossō (Yogacara) school. Chikō's writings teach oral and visualized nenbutsu, with the main goal of attaining samadhi, but also rebirth in the Pure Land.

The most important schools of Japanese Buddhism developed between the twelfth and fourteenth centuries. They were mostly influenced by the eclectic teachings of the Tendai school as their founding monks were all trained originally in the school. This school was founded by Saichō (767–822). During the Heian period, Japanese Pure Land continued to develop in Japanese monasteries, such as the Tendai Mount Hiei complex. One early Tendai figure, Ennin, is known for having brought back the practice of nembutsu from China, and this became the foundation for later Pure Land movements in Japan. It was Tendai monks like Zenyu (913–990) and Senkan (918–983) who first developed a distinctively Japanese Pure Land Buddhist discourse and who authored the Amida shinjūgi and Jūgan hosshinki, respectively.

Another important early figure of Japanese Pure Land was Genshin (942–1017), a Tendai monk known for his promotion of Pure Land practice and his writing of the Ōjōyōshū (Essentials of Birth in the Pure Land) which teaches Amitabha visualization and nembutsu and which was very influential for later Japanese Pure Land authors. Genshin held that since we had entered the era of Dharma decline (mappo), the easy practice of nenbutsu was most effective now. However, he did not argue, like later Japanese Pure Land Buddhists, that one should only practice nenbutsu exclusively and instead believed that the nenbutsu practice was to be supplemented by other practices.

Pure Land practice also continued to develop in other Japanese schools of Buddhism. Figures such as Eikan (1033–1111) and Chinkai (c. 1091–1152) of the Sanron school and Kakuban (1095–1143) of the Shingon school all promoted their own form of Pure Land nembutsu based practice. Eikan's teachings centered on single-minded recitation of Amida's name as the essential practice for rebirth, accessible to all people regardless of status. He taught that Amida's Name contained all merits and could erase even grave sins, grounding this practice in the Original Vow as taught by Shandao while also framing recitation as a means to attain samādhi and the wisdom of emptiness. His emphasis on the exclusive superiority of nenbutsu and his citation of Shandao's key distinction between "Right Practice" and "Miscellaneous Practices" may have influenced later figures like Hōnen (who likely studied Sanron Pure Land at Nara).

Apart from these official monastic figures, there also existed itinerant holy men who traveled the countryside preaching about Pure Land practice. These preachers who practiced outside the authority of official temples, were called hijiri. Some were properly ordained, but others were self-ordained or not ordained at all. Perhaps the most well known of these was Kūya (903–972), who was known for taking images of Amitabha with him and for his musical chanting of the nembutsu. He mainly wandered the country ministering to commoners and teaching them to chant the nenbutsu as well as providing other services like burying the dead, making wells and bridges and helping the needy. He was also devoted to Kannon.

Pure Land practice also spread among commoners and laypersons, especially due to the rise in popularity of deathbed rituals and popular collections of stories of people who had achieved rebirth in the Pure Land, such as the Nihon Ōjō Gokuraku-ki (Records of Rebirth in Utmost Bliss in Japan) by Jakushin (c. 985).

=== Independent sects ===
Japanese Pure Land teachings eventually led to the formation of independent Pure Land institutions, as can be seen in the Jōdo-shū, Jōdo Shinshū, Yūzū-nembutsu-shū, and Ji-shū. These new Pure Land schools were part of a new wave of Buddhist schools founded in the Kamakura period (1185–1333), each which tended to narrow its focus around a single simple practice which was promoted exclusively above all others, especially the complex rituals and practices of Tendai Buddhism. This new focus allowed these schools to appeal to a wider base of support among the commoners.

The first of these, the small Yūzū-nembutsu sect, was founded by the Tendai monk Ryōnin (1072–1132), who taught that just chanting nenbutsu as one's main practice was all that one needed to do to complete all virtues. He was influenced by the Huayan idea of interpenetration and held that chanting the nenbutsu not affected oneself, but also affected everyone around us. In his community, practitioners would sign a register and pledge to recite a certain number of nenbutsus per day. They would also hold joint recitation sessions and believed that all members received the collective benefit of their recitations.

==== Hōnen's Jōdo-shū ====
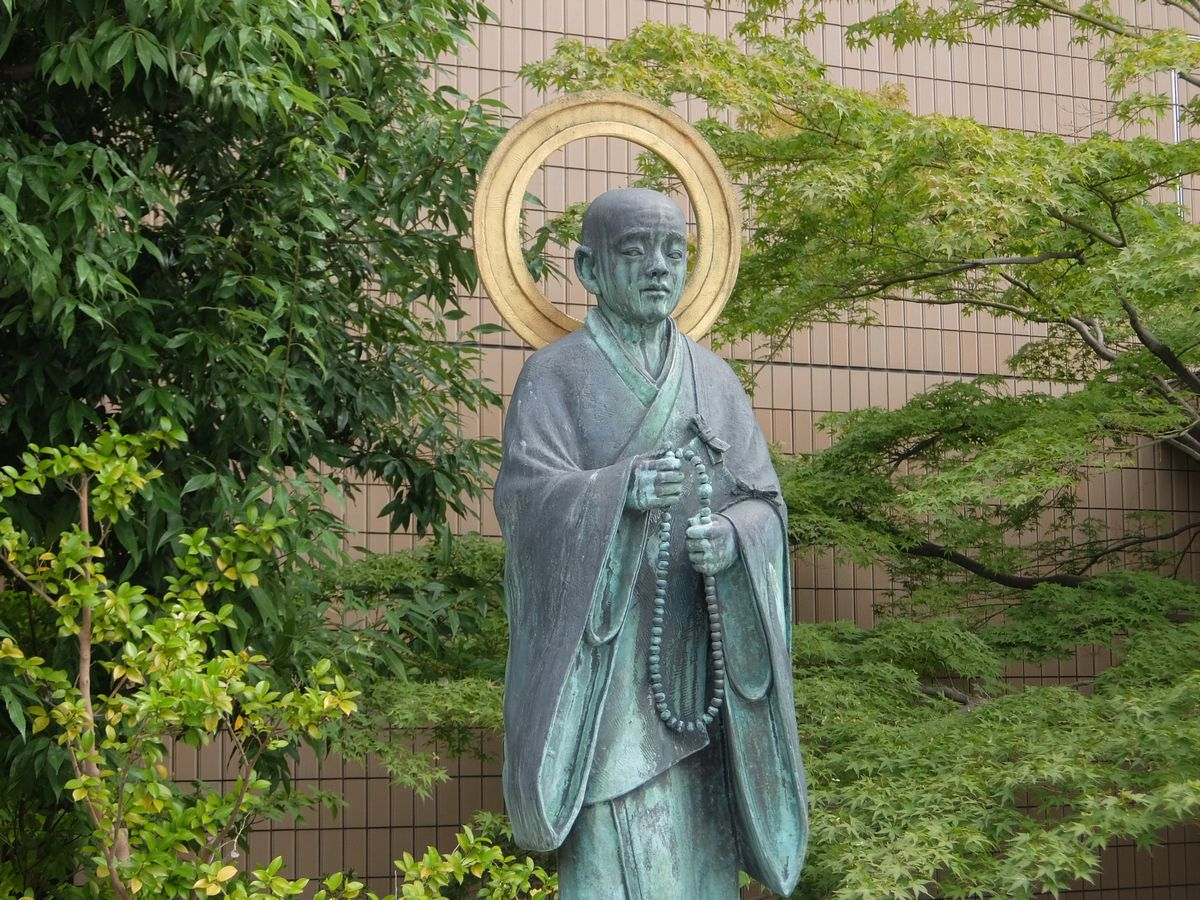
A statue of Hōnen in Bukkyo University

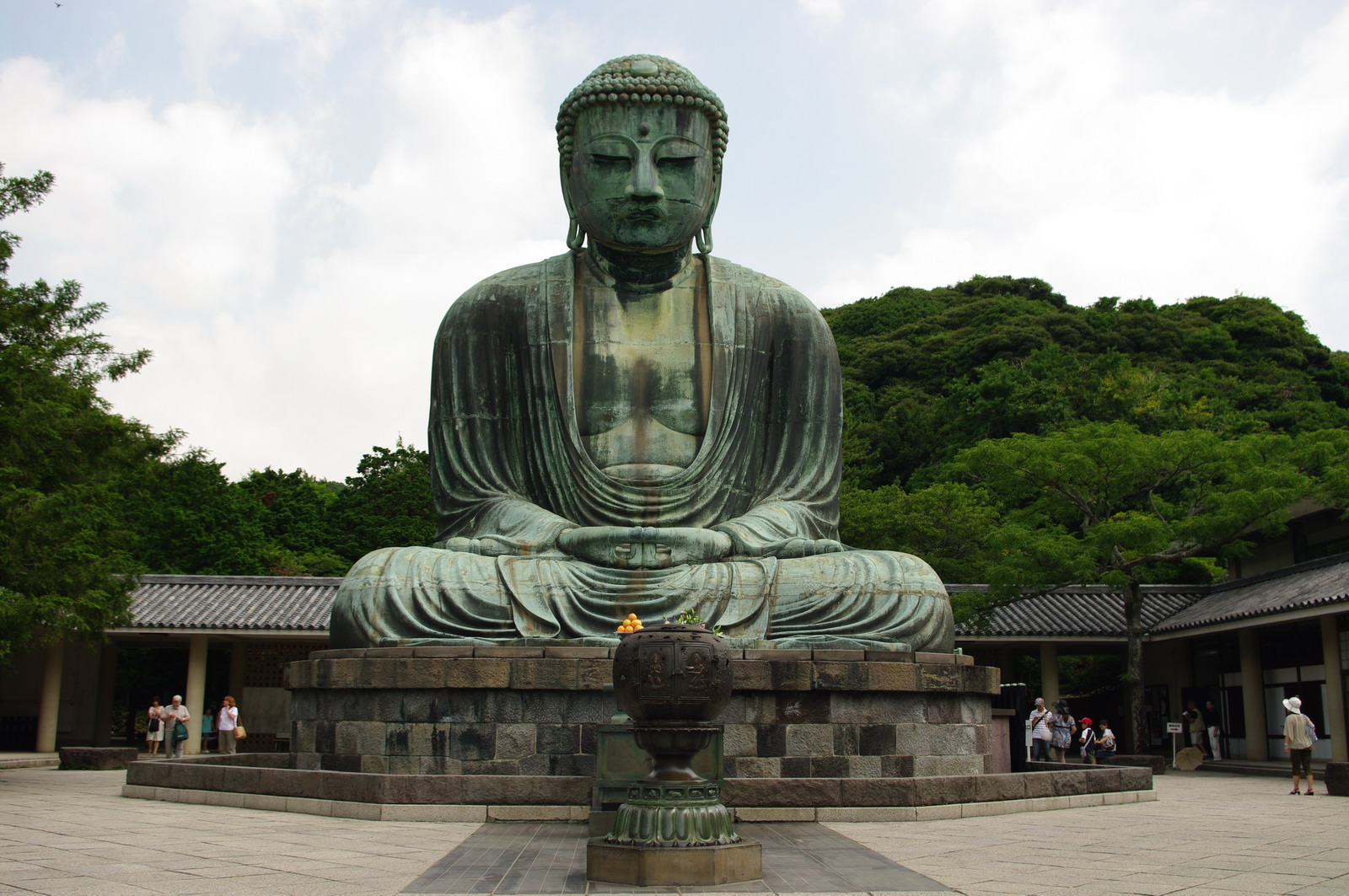
The famous Great Buddha of Kamakura (which depicts Amitabha), at Kōtoku-in, a Buddhist temple of the Jōdo-shū tradition

Hōnen (1133–1212) was a Tendai monk influenced by Genshin who initially practiced under a successor of Ryōnin at Mount Hiei. Through his efforts, a new independent Buddhist school was established (Jōdo-shū) which focused exclusively on Pure Land practice of the nenbutsu (nianfo). Influenced by the work of Shandao, Hōnen held that to reach the Pure Land it was only necessary to orally recite the name of Amitabha. One did not need to meditate, perform any rituals, visualize any Buddha, study sutras or do any other practice (as was common in Tendai and Chinese Pure Land). One just had to recite the name with faith and joy. Thus, Hōnen's doctrine favored simple nenbutsu recitation above all other practices. Indeed, he argued that all other practices were inferior to nenbutsu in this degenerate age.

However, Hōnen is known to have scrupulously kept the Tendai precepts, and to have continued to perform rituals and study texts. Thus, he did not teach that one should completely discard all other practices, only that the nenbutsu was supreme and that only nenbutsu could lead to Buddhahood. And yet, he held that other practices (those which Shandao taught as auxiliary to nenbutsu) could enrich one's nenbutsu practice.

According to Hōnen, even the most unethical or lowly people (like fishermen, prostitutes, etc.) would be saved, as they were, by simply reciting namu amida butsu. Likewise, one did not have to worry about paying for deathbed rituals or organizing one's last days in any specific way. Simply by reciting nenbutsu now one would be saved whenever death came. This simple teaching became very popular in Japan, especially among ordinary people. Because of his reliance on a single simple practice, Hōnen's teaching was widely criticized as neglecting basic Buddhist ethics and bodhicitta. A notable critique was penned by the Kegon author Myōe. While Hōnen was discreet in his critiques of other forms of Buddhism, some of his disciples were not. A scandal involving rumors of some of Hōnen's disciples and an imperial concubine led to Hōnen's exile and the persecution of some of his disciples.

Raigō of Amida and Twenty-five Attendants, (13th–14th century), Chion-in

After Hōnen's death, many of his writings were destroyed by the Tendai school warrior monks who also destroyed his tomb. The state also attempted to suppress his teachings, sending many of his disciples far away from the capital and this may have contributed to spread of the tradition all over Japan. There was also a dispute among his followers over the issue of two different doctrinal stances: once-calling (Jp: ichinengi) and many-calling (tanengi). Once-calling held that you only needed to recite nenbutsu once and you would be saved, the many-calling view held that you needed to recite nenbutsu as much as possible. According to Jones, Hōnen had generally held that many-calling view, arguing for sustained practice, but the once-calling view also had some scriptural support. Thus, the debate continued long after his death.

Initially, the Jōdo-shū were a faction (ha) or sub-sect of the Tendai school, but after the 14th century, it developed into an independent tradition, which was more like a loose family of lineages. A particularly influential event was the founding of the Chinzei branch by Benchō (1162–1238) and the subsequent work of Shōgei (1341–1420) to set up a formal training program for Jōdo Shū priests. This meant they no longer needed to study the monasteries of other traditions. The other main lineage of Jōdo-shū is the Seizan (West Mountain) branch founded by Shōkū (1177–1247).

==== Shinran's Jōdo Shinshū ====
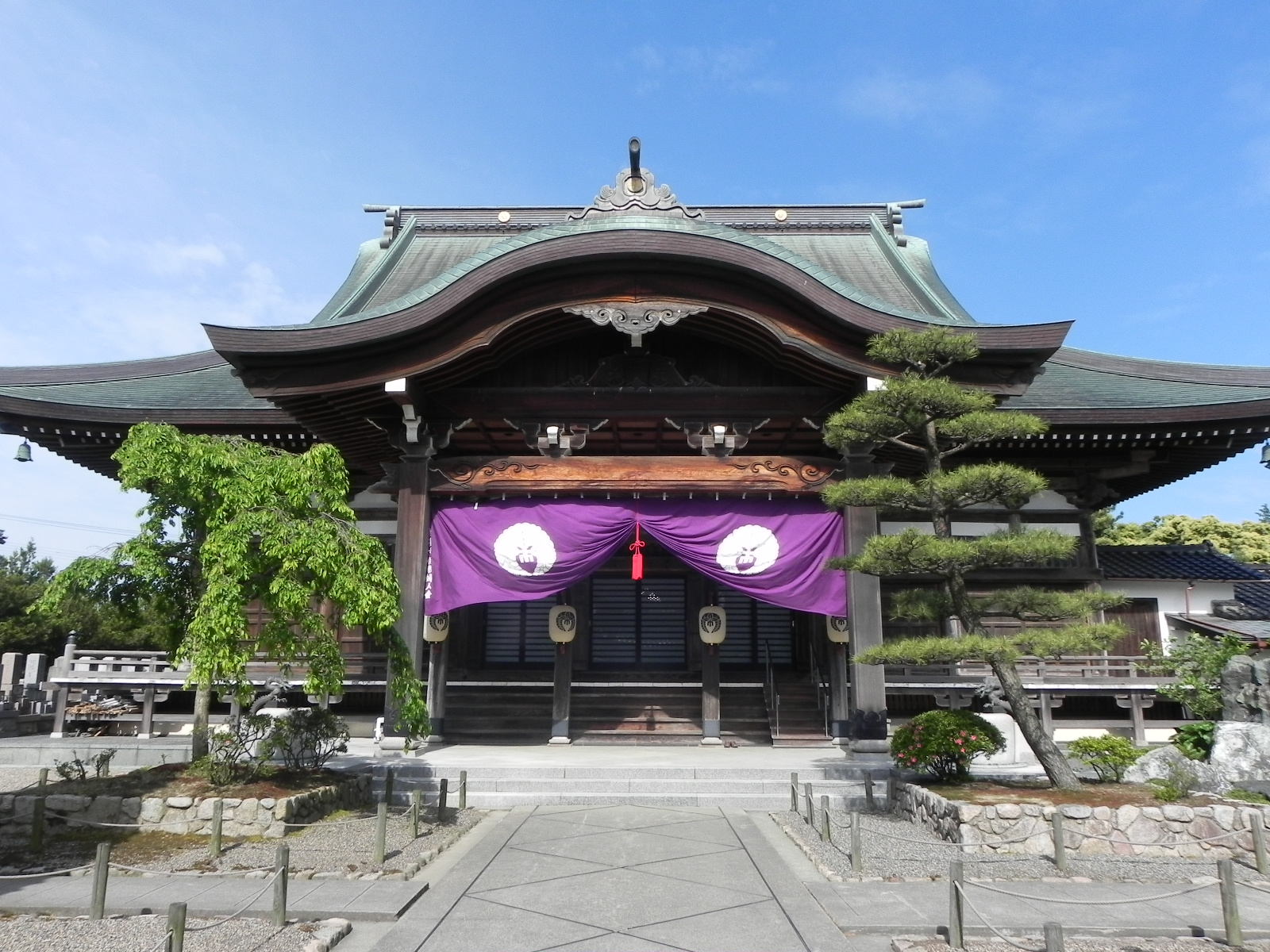
The hondō of Itoku-ji Temple, Japan

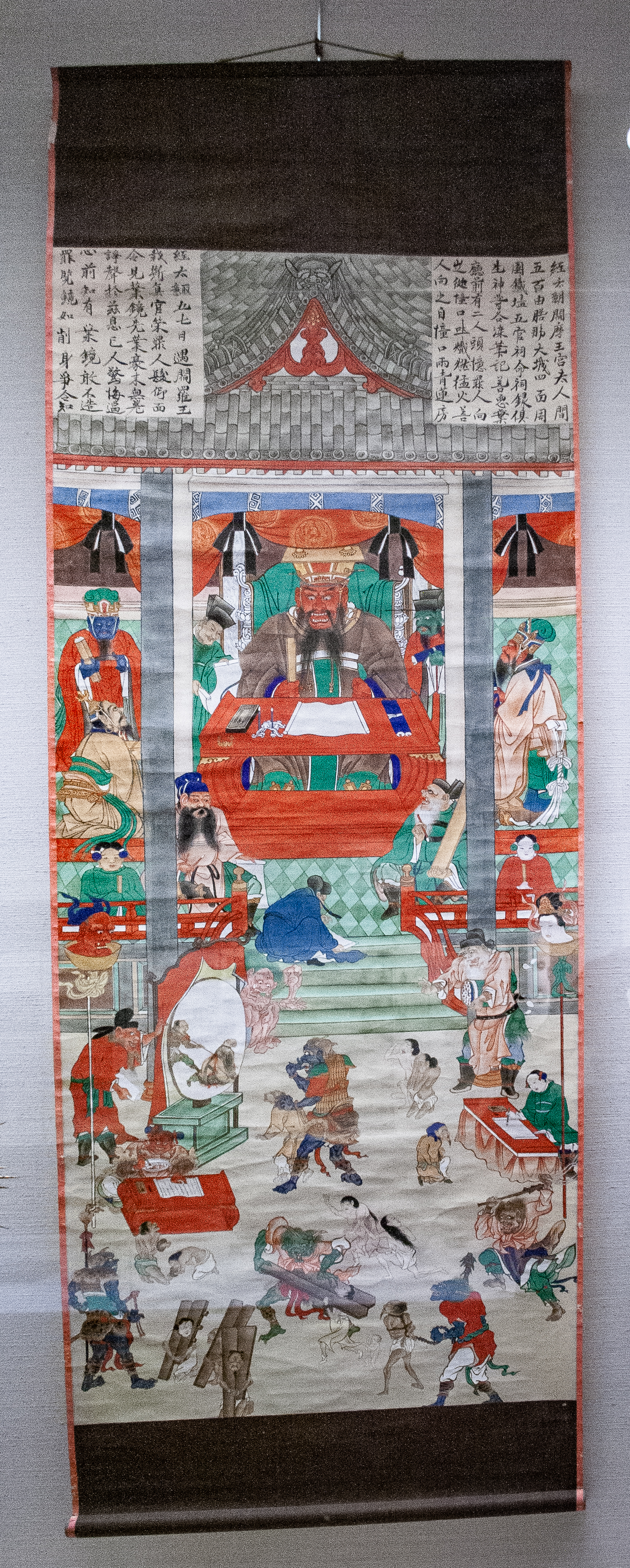
King Enma in Hell. Japanese Pure Land Buddhism

After Hōnen's death, one of his disciples, Shinran Shōnin (1173–1262) created another new Pure Land school, the Jōdo Shinshū (True Pure Land, also known as Shin Buddhism) which would eventually grow to become one of the largest Buddhist schools in Japan. Shinran had been a Tendai monk who saw himself as unsuited to the rigorous practices of the Tendai sect and became a follower of Hōnen.

After he was exiled and defrocked with his master, Shinran married and remained a layman even after he was pardoned by the state in 1211. He then moved to the Kantō region with his family. It was at this time that he realized his practice of all other Buddhist methods other than the nenbutsu were futile and he entrusted himself completely to the power of Amitabha. Shinran would go on to write some important works on Pure Land thought and practice, mainly the Kyōgyōshinshō and the Tannishō, which discuss the importance of total self-abandonment or entrusting (Jp. shinjin) of ourselves to the Buddha Amitabha.

For Shinran, this shinjin – faith or entrusting – became the center of his teaching, which according to Jones, was "a deep conversion experience and the very means by which rebirth became assured." For Shinran, any religious effort arose from a lack of trust in Amitabha's power and vows, which was the only thing that actually led to Buddhahood. Thus, one had to realize that one's own efforts were futile and completely entrust oneself to Amitabha. This total faith expresses itself as the nenbutsu. If someone has not developed shinjin, nenbutsu at least acts as a reminder that one requires salvation from Amitabha, and if one has developed shinjin, it is an expression of gratitude. This entrusting is a total letting go which comes from Amitabha's grace, our own true nature, the Buddha-nature. This is the real "other power" (Jp. tariki) of Amitabha that is beyond the egoistic "self-power" (jiriki) and all notions of self and effort. Thus, other power is not something outside of us according to Shinran, but is immanent as our Buddha-nature.

The fact that Shinran was not a monk meant that he and his followers often did not meet in temples, but in various other places, including private homes, which they might designate as dōjōs. These lay groups or congregations (monto) would also choose their own leaders and meet to practice nenbutsu together. According to Jones, "The development of independent congregations of laypeople managing their own practice and organizations loosened the control that religious orders and the aristocracy traditionally exercised, and it represented a new, more democratic structure for Japanese Buddhism as a whole."

After his death, Shinran's communities remained as independent congregations, and the tradition now known as "Jōdo Shinshū" slowly developed over time. Shinran's sons and family, especially his grandson Kakunyo (1270–1351) and great-grandson Zonkaku (1290–1373) became influential caretakers of the tradition centered on Honganji temple which was built on the site of Shinran's grave. Preaching and proselytizing was an important part of the tradition and there was a kind of equality between men and women (who were also given leadership roles). Rennyo (1415–1499) was one of the most influential figures in Shin Buddhist history. He was the eighth head of Honganji and led an expansion in membership and unification of Shin Buddhism. He also wrote new texts which clarified the doctrine of the tradition.

==== Ippen ====
Another, smaller Pure Land sect known as Jishū (時宗) was founded by Ippen (1239–1289). Ippen was influenced by Hōnen, as well as Zen and Shingon Buddhism. He wandered throughout Japan teaching nenbutsu with a band of followers. Ippen taught that not even faith was necessary for salvation, only the actual chanting the nenbutsu alone was needed. This is because he held, like Tanluan, that the mere name of Amitabha contained his entire reality. Amitabha was fully present in the name, since his existence, his Dharmakaya, was all pervasive. Thus, the recitation of the nenbutsu made one's mind non-dual with Amitabha. Because of this, one did not need to generate faith. Faith was a gift from the Buddha, but not something we could give rise to by ourselves (since this was a kind of self-power) and so we should not be concerned with it. Ippen's teaching was very popular and his sect was the dominant Pure Land sect for the two centuries following his death, but then it went into decline.

=== Later developments ===
Today in Japan, Pure Land schools make up almost 40 percent of Buddhist practitioners and has the most temples, second only to Zen schools. In Japan, strong institutional boundaries exist between sects which serve to clearly separate the Japanese Pure Land schools from the Japanese Zen schools. One notable exception to this is found in the Ōbaku Zen school, which was founded in Japan during the 17th century by the Chinese Buddhist monk Ingen (Chinese Yinyuan Longqi). The Ōbaku school of Zen retains many Chinese features such as mindfulness of Amitābha through recitation and recitation of the Pure Land sūtras.

Upon encountering Japanese Pure Land traditions which emphasize faith, many westerners saw outward parallels between these traditions and Protestant Christianity. This has led many western authors to speculate about possible connections between these traditions. However, the cosmology, internal assumptions, and underlying doctrines and practices are now known to have many differences.

== East Asian doctrines ==
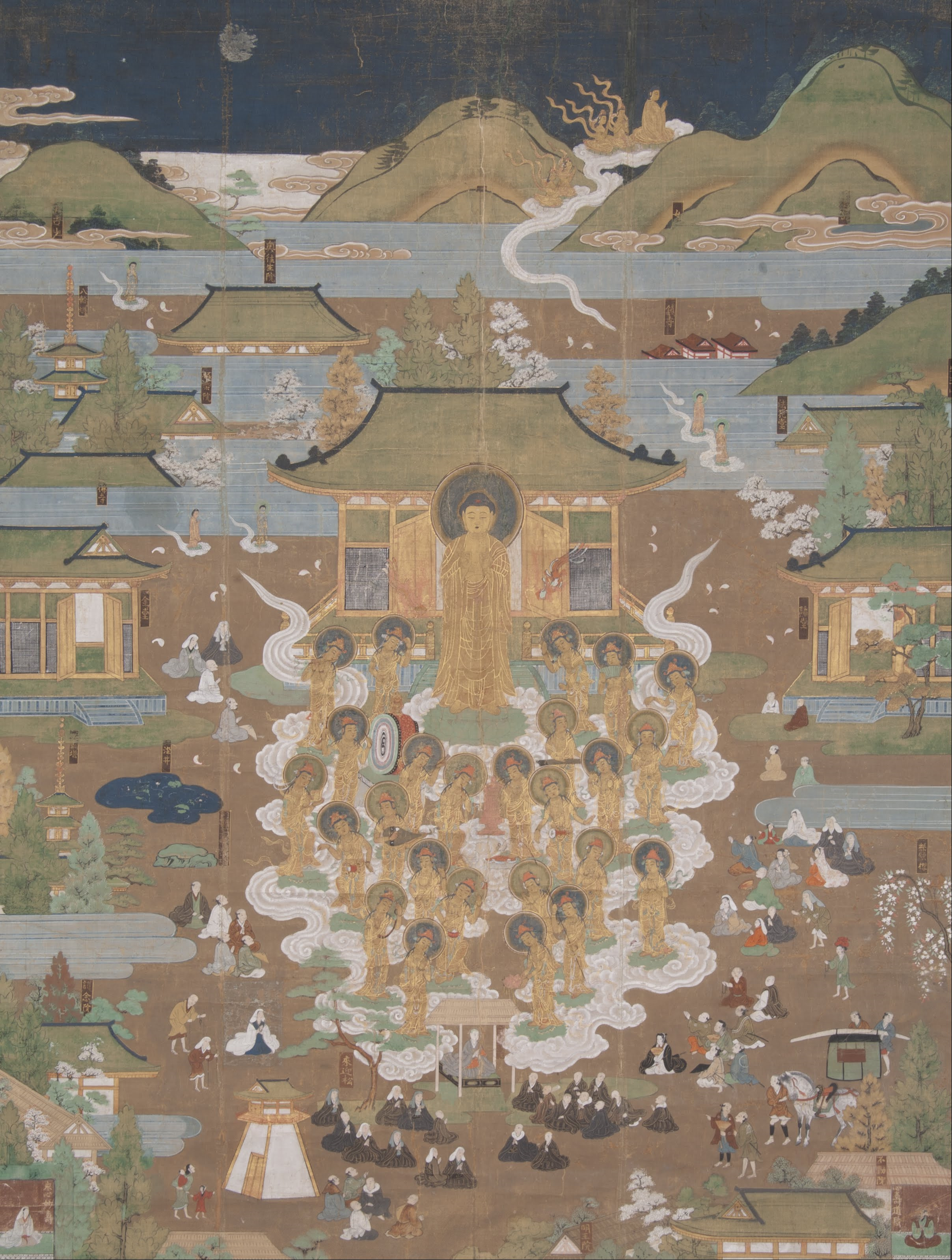
Amida Welcomes Chûjôhime to the Western Paradise, Taima Temple, Japan

Contemporary Pure Land traditions see Amitābha expounding the Dharma in his Pure Land (淨土), a region offering respite from karmic transmigration. Amitābha's pure land of Sukhāvatī (Land of Bliss) is described in the Longer Sukhāvatīvyūha Sūtra as a land of beauty that surpasses all other realms. It is said to be inhabited by many gods, men, flowers, fruits, and adorned with wish-granting trees where rare birds come to rest. Chinese Pure Land sources describe it by various names including "Western buddha-land" (西方佛土), "Land of Amitābha Buddha" (阿彌陀佛國), "Utmost Bliss" (極樂), "Peace and Nurturance" (安養) and "Peace and Bliss" (安樂).

In Pure Land traditions, entering the Pure Land is popularly perceived as equivalent to the attainment the bodhisattva stage of non-retrogression. Upon entry into the Pure Land, the practitioner is then instructed in the Dharma by Amitābha Buddha and numerous bodhisattvas until they attain full buddhahood. Bodhisattvas also have the capacity of sending out manifestation bodies to any of the six realms of existence in order to help all sentient beings in saṃsāra, all without actually leaving the Pure Land.

In Mahāyāna Buddhism, there are many buddhas, and each buddha has a pure land. Amitābha's pure land of Sukhāvatī is understood to be in the western direction, whereas Akṣobhya's pure land of Abhirati is to the east. Though there are other Buddhist traditions devoted to being reborn in the company of other Buddhas (such as Maitreya), Amitabha's Pure Land is by far the most popular. Indeed, according to Jones, most Chinese, Japanese and Korean Buddhists today practice to reach the Pure Land of Amitabha in some way.

Pure Land Buddhists believe that there is evidence of dying people going to the pure land, including knowing the time of death, visions of Amitābha and the two bodhisattvas, Avalokiteśvara and Mahāsthāmaprāpta and records of past Pure Land Buddhists who have died and left behind relics (śarīra).

=== Other direction vs Mind-only ===
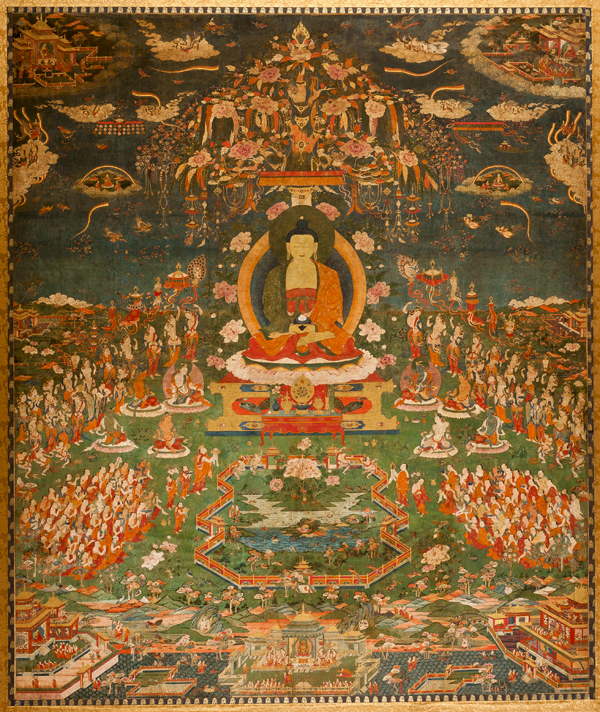
A Tibetan painting of Amitābha in Sukhāvatī

The Pure Land is widely understood by many classic Chinese Pure Land sources as surpassing or being beyond the triple realm (the desire realm, form realm and formless realm). However, while it was and is common to think of the Pure Land as an actual place that one is literally reborn into after death, other sources and authors emphasize the idea that this world is itself coextensive with the Pure Land and thus that they are not separate places. According to Jones, "the most frequently cited texts in support of this version of the Pure Land were the Vimalakīrti Sutra (維摩詰所說經, T.475) and the Platform Sutra of the Sixth Patriarch (六祖大師法寶壇經, T.2008)."

Thus, Chinese Buddhism inherited two different views of the Pure Land:

- "western-direction Pure Land" (西方淨土) or "other-direction Pure Land" (他方淨土) which saw the Pure Land as another realm that was far away from this world and which one could attain after death by being reborn there after performing various Pure Land practices. This view was defended by figures like Tanluan and Shandao and tended to be popular among the more devotional oriented figures which taught about the Pure Land and these figures tended to focus on the magnificent features of the Pure Land in order to arouse a desire to go to there in their disciples.
- "mind-only Pure Land" (唯心淨土), which was also favored by the Chan (Zen) tradition, held that this world is itself a Pure Land and it only appears impure because of our own impure minds project impurity on the world. In this view, by purifying our minds we gain the Pure Land. A passage from the Contemplation Sutra which states "this mind creates the Buddha, this mind is the Buddha" is also used by the defenders of this view.

According to Jones, these two ideas led to many debates within Chinese Buddhism, which continued right up to the 20th century. The Pure Land patriarch Yìnguāng (c. 1861–1940) for example, writes that to see the various splendors of the Pure Land as "fables, metaphors, or psychological states" was "heretical" and a "ludicrous view".

On the other hand, those who promoted the "mind-only Pure Land" view saw the idea that the Pure Land was "somewhere else" as violating the Mahayana doctrine of the non-duality of purity and impurity, of samsara and nirvana. They also held that stating that a Pure Land can exist external to the mind and can appear pure even to an impure mind contradicts the Mahayana idea that the world is constructed by the mind. This view is defended by the famous Chan text known as the Platform Sutra. In this text, Huineng states that only the deluded hope to be born in a faraway land in the west, while the wise who know their nature is empty seek the Pure Land by purifying their minds.

Other Chinese thinkers attempted to reconcile the two views. Yunqi Zhuhong (1535–1615) held that the teachings on the existence of the Pure Land as a place was a skillful means (upāya) which the Buddha used to help those of lesser capacities. In reality, the Buddha has no need of an actual place or land since he dwells everywhere, and yet out of compassion for others who need such a place, he manifests the Pure Land in order to draw in sentient beings. Once they reach the Pure Land, they learn the Dharma and realize it was always just mind. True sages know both that both truths are deeply interpenetrating and thus they can hold both ideas (other direction and mind-only Pure Land) without contradiction. Thus, he writes:

Now to contemplate (念) emptiness is true nian, and production enters into non-production [or, birth enters into non-birth], and to nian the Buddha (nianfo) is to nian the mind. Birth there (i.e., in the Pure Land) does not mean leaving birth here (the present defiled world). Mind, Buddha, and sentient beings are of one substance, the middle stream does not abide on [either of] the two banks. Therefore, we say "the Amitābha of one's own nature; the Pure Land of mind-only."

=== Apologetics ===
Chinese thinkers like Zuhong and Yuan Hongdao also developed a schema which included various categories of Pure Lands. With these schema, they could accept the existence of both "mind-only" Pure Lands as well as Amitabha's Pure Land as another world. Yuan's schema also includes numerous other types of Pure Lands found in Mahayana literature, including: the Pure Land of the Primordial Buddha Vairocana which is the entire dharmadhātu in which all dharmas perfectly interfuse, the Pure Land of Vulture Peak assembly taught in the Lotus Sutra, which is also called the Constant-truth Pure Land (héng zhēn jìngtǔ), and the Conjured-manifestation Pure Land, which only exists for a brief period of time, such as when the Buddha changes the world in the Vimalakirti Sutra. Yuan's typology of Pure Lands served to resolve some of the conflict regarding the nature of the Pure Land by relying on classic Buddhist sources to show how there was a large variety of Pure Lands to be found in them.

Chinese Pure Land thinkers sometimes defended Pure Land thought by explaining it within the context of Tiantai and Huayan philosophy. For example, Yuan Hongdao used the Tiantai doctrine of the three truths to defend the existence of the Pure Land path as a provisionally true yet empty reality. Meanwhile, Yuan Hongdao and Yinguang both draw on Huayan thought to argue for the truth of Pure Land. Yuan Hongdao uses the Huayan theory of Indra's net to explain how the Pure Land perfectly interpenetrates with all buddha-lands and all the impure lands.

Chinese Pure Land thinkers also argued for the efficacy of Pure Land practice in different ways. For example, they argued that the idea that a seemingly small effort of nianfo practice had a great effect was not illogical, since sometimes a small cause (like a spark) could have a great effect (like a large fire caused by one spark). Some also argued that one could not know how much good karma one had accumulated in the past, and that nianfo practice might take many lives to produce birth in the Pure Land.

=== Self-power and other-power ===
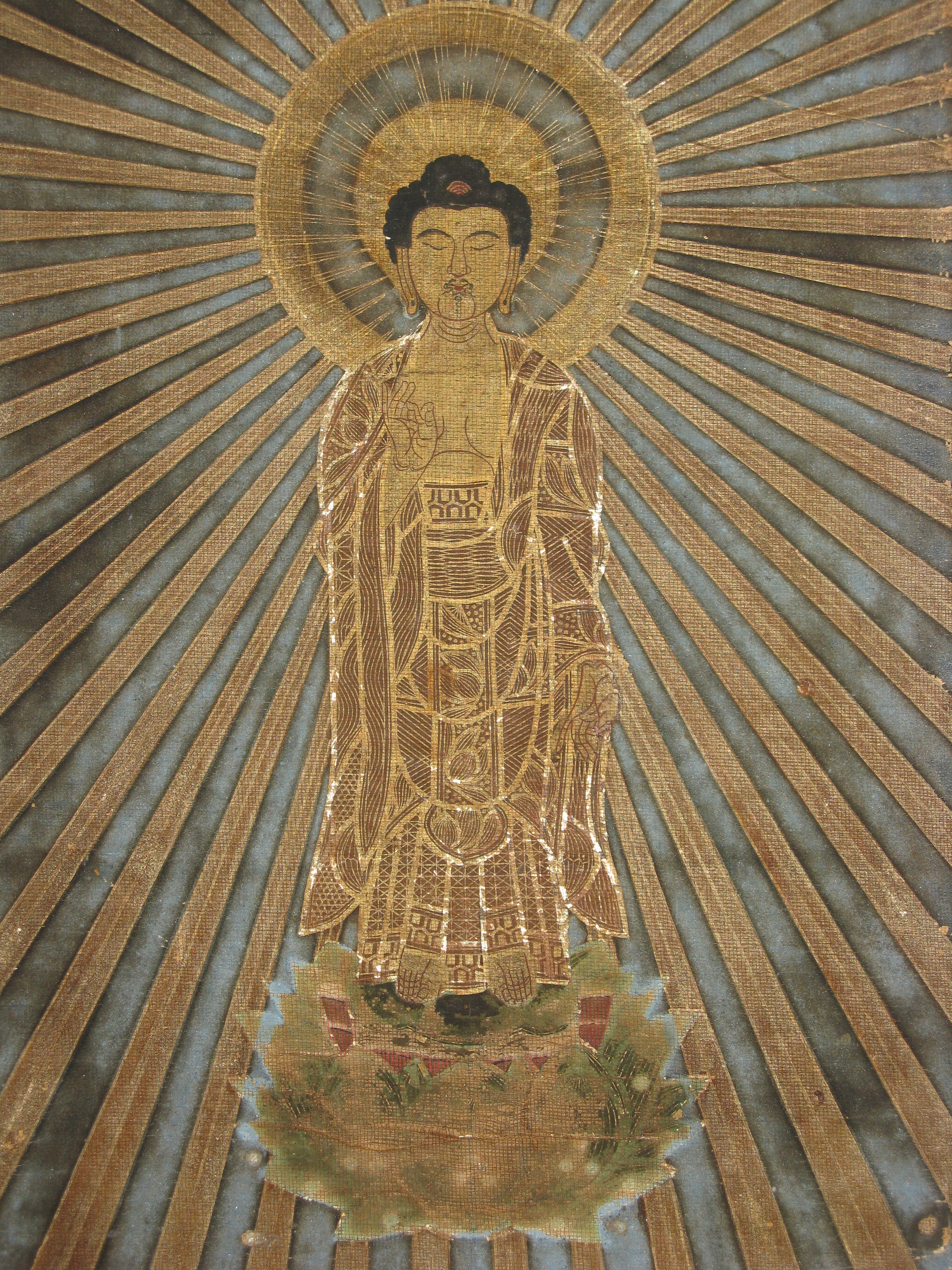
"Amida Manifesting in the Dharma-body of Expedient Means", Japanese painting, at the Metropolitan Museum of Art.

"Self-power" (自力) and "other-power" (他力) are key terms which are used to explain and define Pure Land practice in East Asian Buddhism. It was Shandao who first argued that Amitabha's power helped take people to the Pure Land after death (previous authors just held that Amitabha created the Pure Land and it was up to an individual's own effort to make it there). This other power relationship was compared to how a lowly man who is accompanied by a king can enter previously inaccessible places.

Chinese Pure Land Buddhism never denied the importance of self-power. Instead, according to Jones, Chinese Pure Land generally holds that "Rebirth in the Pure Land results when the two powers work together, an idea that the modern Taiwan Pure Land master Zhiyu (智諭, 1924–2000) captured with the phrase "the two powers of self and other" (自他二力)." Thus, in Chinese Pure Land, rebirth in the Pure Land arises from a cooperation of the practitioner and the Buddha.

Yunqi Zhuhong argues that the practitioner's efforts connect with the Buddha's power through "sympathetic resonance" (感應) which links them with the Buddha, attuning their mind with that of the Buddha, much like one plucked string in a lute can make another string nearby resonate. According this view, the more that one practiced nianfo, the stronger and more enduring this bond with Amitabha became. However, Chinese Pure Land masters also argued that one certainly cannot rely on self-power alone, which they denigrated as a futile effort.

Chinese authors like Yuan Hongdao also argue that the actual nature of the Pure Land way "is not self-power, nor is it other-power." Instead, according to Yuan, there is ultimately no real distinction between the Pure Land practitioner and the Buddha Amitābha and thus, the distinction between self-power and other-power is not ultimately real, and yet we can speak of this interaction conventionally (which he describes through metaphors). The twelfth "patriarch" of Chinese Pure Land, Jixing Chewu also held that the practitioner and Amitābha, while distinct beings, are also really non-dual. When one chants nianfo, a sympathetic resonance is activated which leads to a non-dual realization of one's true nature as Amitabha.

In the Japanese Pure Land schools of Hōnen and Shinran which developed in the Kamakura period, self-power is considered as completely pointless and powerless. Self-power does nothing for the Pure Land devotee. Those who wish to attain the Pure Land must only rely on the other-power of Amitābha, entrusting themselves to it by reciting the nembutsu. Shinran consistently denigrated all efforts to self cultivation and made the entrusting heart (信心) as the only important element in gaining the Pure Land. This created another problem, that of antinomianism, which was the idea that if one's salvation is assured, then there was no need to be moral at all and one could engage in wrongdoing without being concerned. Shinran attacked this problem by arguing that engaging in wrongdoing was just another form of clinging to self-power.

Another difference between the Chinese and Japanese traditions is that the Japanese Pure Land schools generally hold that, since the Buddha does all the work of salvation, one's rebirth in the Pure Land is assured once one has faithfully recited the Buddha's name. No matter how wicked one may still be one will definitely reach the Pure Land. However, the Chinese traditions often hold out the prospect that a Pure Land practitioner might fail to get into the Pure Land due to various factors, such as ethical failings or getting distracted at the crucial moment of death This is because the Chinese tradition holds that Pure Land practice provides a connection to the Buddha only as long as the practitioner keeps the Buddha in mind. The effects of the practice can cease if one stops doing it. They compared this to lighting a lamp, which can remove all the darkness in a room immediately, but which will not provide light if it is put out.

The concept of other power is related to other important ideas in Pure Land thought and broader Mahayana such as merit transference, esoteric empowerment (adhiṣṭhāna) and the idea that there is an "easy path" and a "difficult path" (or "path of sages"). Transference of merit is the idea that Buddhas and bodhisattvas can transfer their immense stores of merit (puṇya, a beneficial protective force that is accumulated by good deeds), to other beings. This idea is found in many Mahayana sutras. The concept of other power is seen as the easy path of practice, following the ideas presented in the "Chapter on Easy Practice" in the Shízhù pípóshā lùn (Treatise on the ten levels, T.1521) attributed to Nagarjuna. This text promotes the easy path of Pure land over the difficult path of practice which entails many aeons of practice and may not be suitable for people. This text describes the easy path as follows: "If a bodhisattva wishes to attain to the stage of non-retrogression in this body and accomplish supreme highest enlightenment, he should contemplate (念) all the buddhas of the ten directions and invoke their names."

=== In the human realm ===
During the 20th century, a new way of conceiving Pure Land developed which was more humanistic. This development was led by the monk Taixu who argued that Buddhism should benefit humans in this life, and should not just be for the afterlife. He called this new Buddhism, "Buddhism for Human Life" (人生佛教), which has also been termed Humanistic Buddhism. This new kind of Buddhism promoted the idea that the ideal Buddhist world could be built here and now, something Taixu called "The Pure Land in the Human Realm" (人間淨土). While Taixu did not repudiate the idea of post-mortem rebirth in Amitabha's Pure Land, he also promoted the idea of improving people's everyday lives through social reform and the building of an ideal Buddhist community.

Some of Taixu's disciples, like Sheng Yen and Cheng Yen developed his ideas further. According to Jones, they held that Buddhists should not desire to escape from this world of suffering by seeking rebirth in a faraway land. Instead, Buddhists should "engage in social reform and charitable work in order to transform this world into a Pure Land. In this model, the Pure Land will appear when the environment is cleansed and healed, the rights of women and children are safeguarded, and economic and social justice prevail." However, Jones notes that Sheng Yen's writings reveal that he did not reject the practice of seeking rebirth in Amitabha's Pure Land and instead presented an eclectic view that accepted all views on the Pure Land. According to Sheng Yen, the socially focused actions of humanistic Buddhism do not conflict with traditional Pure Land practices, instead they prepare one for birth in Amitabha's Pure Land. He also attempts to harmonize these with the other classic view that holds that the Pure Land is just in the mind.

== Practices ==
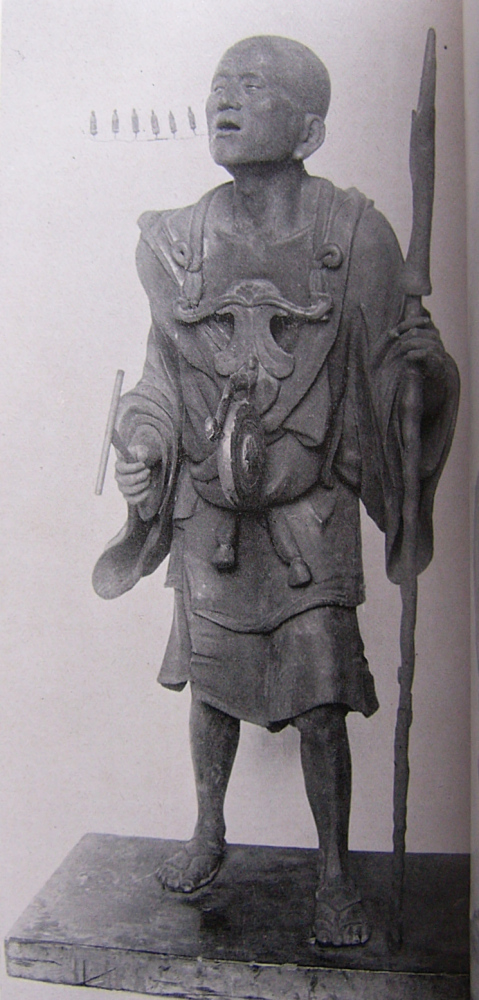
Statue of Kūya by Kōshō, son of Unkei, dating to the first decade of the thirteenth century. The six syllables of the nembutsu, na-mu-a-mi-da-butsu, are represented literally by six small Amida figures streaming from Kūya's mouth.

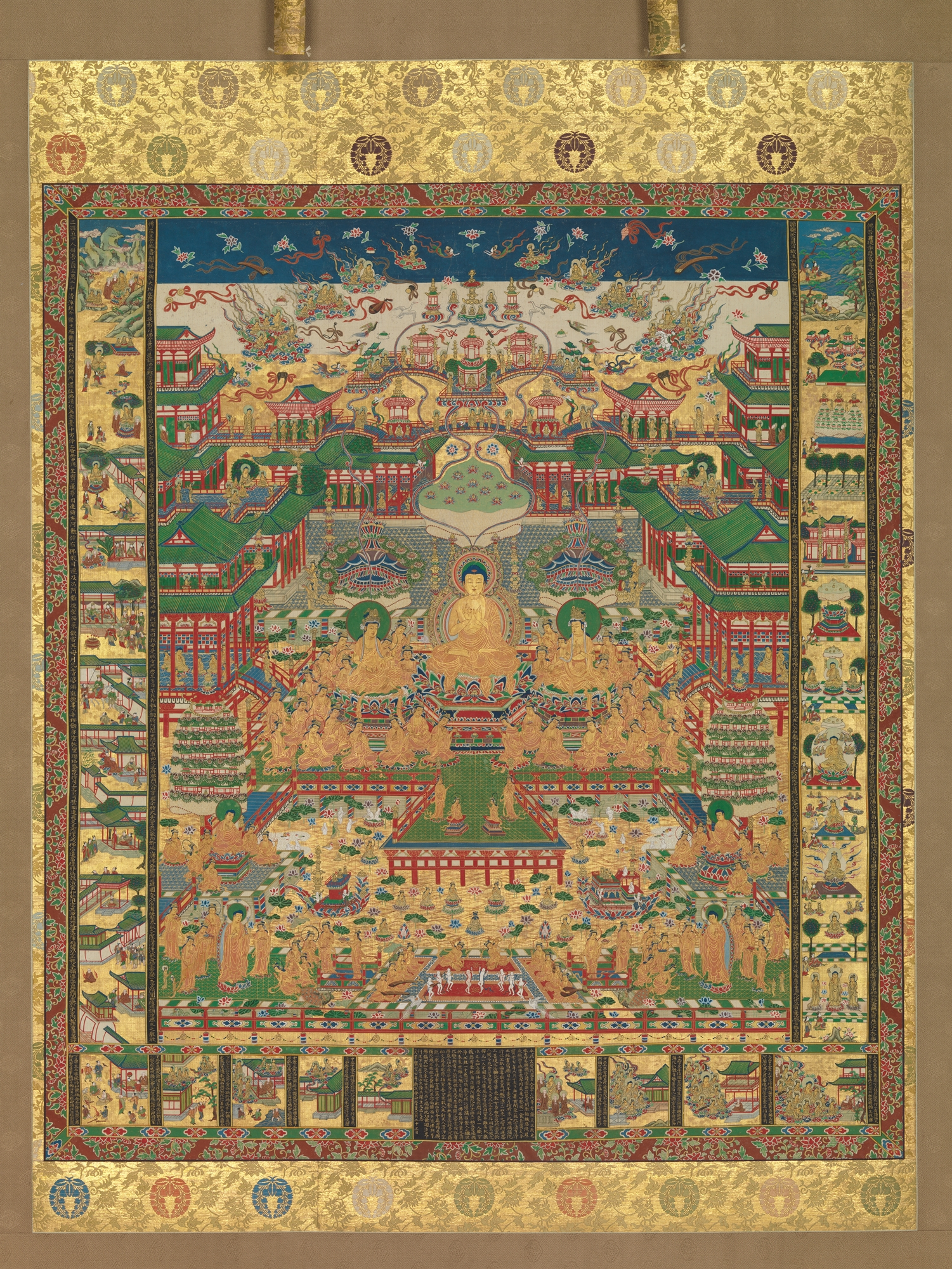
Japanese copy of the Pure Land Taima Mandala, which is based on the Amitāyurdhyāna Sūtra.

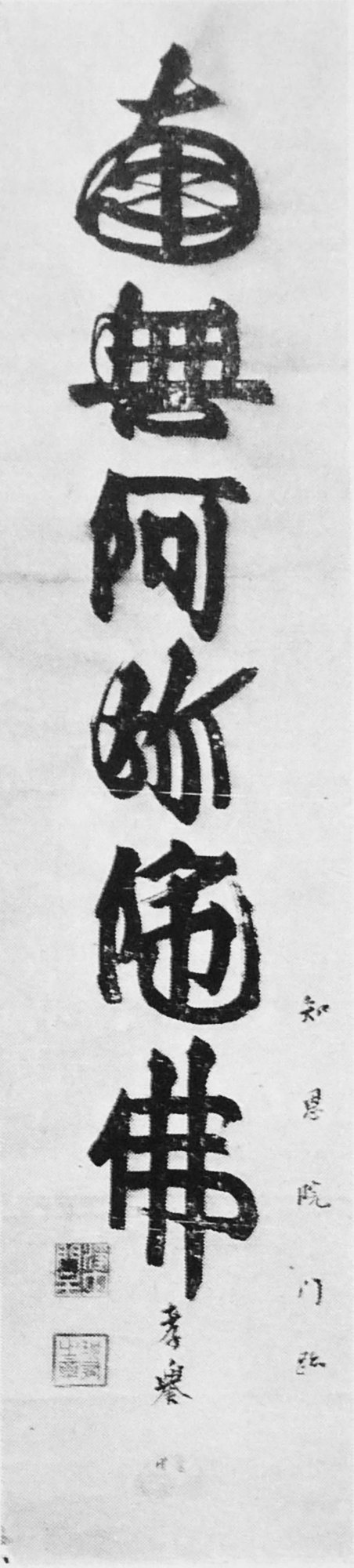
Yamashita Gen-yu's (1832–1934) calligraphy of the characters of the nianfo

Pure Land is one of the most widely practiced traditions of Buddhism in East Asia. It may be the dominant form of Buddhism in China, Japan, Vietnam and Korea.

All Chinese sources agree that the principal practice of the Pure Land "easy path" is nianfo (念佛; Japanese: nenbutsu), which is described in a variety of different ways by Chinese sources and is also called "holding the name" (chēngmíng). Patriarch Shandao writes that while nianfo is the "primary deed" (zhengye) in pure land practice, there are also four other auxiliary practices (zhuye): reciting Pure Land sutras, contemplating Amitabha, worshiping Amitabha and singing praises to Amitabha. All other practices apart from these are "miscellaneous practices" (zaxing) and are secondary to the five primary Pure Land practices.

In some forms of East Asian Buddhism, nianfo is generally seen as one practice among many. For example, according to Yuan dynasty monk Tianru Weize's (天如惟則, 1286?–1354) Questions about Pure Land (T.1972), there are three main approaches to Pure Land practice: visualization (觀想), recollection and invocation (意念), and "various practices" (眾行) which include ethical precepts, taking refuge and so on (and whose merit can lead to the Pure Land, especially if dedicated to this purpose).

In other quarters however, nianfo is the only practice which is recommended and other practices are not seen as helpful. The Japanese Pure Land sects of Jōdo-shū and Jōdo Shinshū traditionally focus on the oral recitation of the nianfo exclusively. Similarly, the Chinese master Jixing Chewu (1741–1810) practiced and taught nianfo exclusively, having practiced it together with Chan in the past but then having abandoning this dual practice for an exclusive focus on nianfo.

=== Nianfo ===
==== In Chinese Buddhism ====
Repeating the name of a Buddha such as Amitābha is traditionally a form of mindfulness of the Buddha (Skt. buddhānusmṛti). This term was translated into Chinese as nianfo, by which it is popularly known in English. The practice is often described as calling the buddha to mind by repeating his name, to enable the practitioner to bring all his or her attention upon that Buddha (See: samādhi) chanting Amituofo while walking, prostrating, or in seated meditation . This may be done vocally or mentally, and with or without the use of Buddhist prayer beads. Those who practice this method often commit to a fixed set of repetitions per day. For instance, the monk Shandao is said to have practiced this day and night without interruption, each time emitting light from his mouth. Therefore, he was bestowed with the title "Great Master of Light" (光明大師) by Emperor Gaozong of Tang.

However, Chinese Buddhist Pure Land practice also commonly relies on multiple elements for their practice of nianfo, including contemplation and visualization of Amitābha, his attendant bodhisattvas, and the Pure Land. Such visualization methods are found in the Pratyutpanna-samādhi-sūtra and in the Amitayurdhyana Sutra, which presents sixteen progressive visualizations, each corresponding to the attainment of various levels of rebirth in the Pure Land.

The first of these steps is contemplation of a setting sun, until the visualization is clear whether the eyes are open or closed. Each step adds complexity to the visualization of Sukhāvatī, with the final contemplation being an expansive visual which includes Amitābha and his attendant bodhisattvas. According to Inagaki Hisao, this method was widely followed in the past for the purpose of developing samādhi. Visualization practises for Amitābha are also popular in Chinese Esoteric Buddhism, Shingon Buddhism as well as other schools of Vajrayana.

One Chinese master who taught nianfo along with visualization was Yìnguāng (1861–1940). He also stressed the importance of other elements in this practice, mainly faith in Amitābha, vowing to be reborn in Sukhāvatī and also having the intention to transfer the merit of one's practice to all beings. Similarly, Jixing Chewu stressed the importance of various prerequisite elements to nianfo practice: bodhicitta, faith in the Pure Land, an aspiration to achieve rebirth there, a sense of shame at past wrongdoing, joy at having learned of Pure Land, sadness over one's bad karma and gratitude to the Buddha.

==== Types of nianfo ====
Guifeng Zongmi was a Huayan and Chan master who also wrote on nianfo practice. He taught a schema of four types of nianfo which were adopted by later Pure Land authors like Yunqi Zhuhong (1535–1615) and Zhiyu (1924–2000). Zongmi's four types of nianfo are (1) Contemplation of the name "which focuses on "mentally holding" the name; (2) Contemplating an image of the Buddha; (3) Contemplating the major and minor marks of a Buddha without a physical image, and (4) Contemplating the "true mark", in which one contemplates the Dharma Body (Dharmakaya), the true self in all phenomenon.

- "Contemplation of the name" (稱名念), which is based on The Perfection of Wisdom Sutra preached by Mañjuśrī (T.232) and involves selecting a Buddha, facing their direction, and focusing on their name until one has a vision of all Buddhas (past, present, and future). As noted by Jones, while later Chinese Pure Land thinkers interpreted this practice as oral recitation, it seems that for Zongmi this entailed mentally "holding" (稱名) the sound of the name. Yunqi Zhuhong taught "holding the name" in various ways including: audible recitation of the name (明持), silent contemplation of the name (默持), or contemplation accompanied by barely audible whispering of the name (半明半默持).
- "Contemplating an image" (觀像念), which is based on the Dà bǎojī jīng (大寶積經, Great Jewel Collection Sutra, T.310) Through contemplating an image of a Buddha, one may achieve the realisation the non-duality or separation from imaging with a Buddha and as extension all sentient life."
- "Contemplating the visualization" (觀想念), "means to contemplate the major and minor marks of a Buddha's body without the aid of a physical image. The first comes from the Sutra of Fó shuō guānfó sānmèihǎi jīng (佛說觀佛三昧海經) where the practitioner may choose to select one of the Buddha's features or attributes to focus on or contemplate them all simultaneously." or second that comes from the Zuòchán sānmèi jīng (坐禪三昧經) Sutra where the practitioner contemplates one or all of the four greats (四大) at a time that being earth, wind, fire, water or any other Dhrama. This is also the method for the visually impaired or blind practitioner.
- "Contemplating the true mark" (實相念), Normally reserved for experienced or advanced practitioners "one contemplates the Buddha's dharma body, which is also the contemplation of one's own true self and the true nature of all phenomena. This is also based on The Perfection of Wisdom Sutra Preached by Mañjuśrī, which describes the Buddha nature as primordial universality as John's refers to as a "unproduced and unextinguished, neither going nor coming, without name and without feature. That alone is called 'buddha'."

This schema may have been presented as a progressive path of practice, from easiest to most difficult and profound. While Zongmi held that the fourth method of nianfo was the most profound, Yunqi Zhuhong reversed this progression, arguing that "contemplation of the name" was actually the highest practice and that it was to obtain wisdom and enlightenment in this life more than to be reborn in the Pure Land.

Yunqi Zhuhong also taught that there were two main mental attitudes that can be applied to practicing nianfo:

- "Phenomenal holding of the name" (事持), which entails concentrating on the individual syllables of the name. This leads to a calm and focused mind, and thus to samadhi and so it is mainly a "calming" (止, samatha) practice.
- "Noumenal holding of the name" (理持), which shifts the attention to the mind that is holding the name and eventually realizes that the non-duality of oneself and Amitabha. This is a contemplation (觀) practice aimed at wisdom.

==== In Japanese Buddhism ====
The various Japanese Buddhist traditions practice Pure Land in different ways. In traditions like Sanron and Tendai, nenbutsu (nianfo) is seen as one method among many, to be practiced in conjunction with other Buddhist practices like meditation, rituals, and precepts.

The independent Pure Land schools in Japan, especially Jōdo Shinshū, have different interpretations of nianfo where they emphasize nianfo and faith or the entrusting heart (shinjin) over and above all other forms of Buddhist practice. They also hold that this idea was taught by the three Chinese Patriarchs of their purported lineage: Tanluan, Daochuo and Shandao. This exclusivity is not supported by the historical evidence which shows that the Chinese patriarchs undertook visualization meditation, scriptural study and other practices. However, even if this is their doctrinal emphasis, Jōdo Shinshū practitioners still engage in other practices, including liturgy, scripture chanting, charity and so on.

=== Precepts, meditation and other practices ===
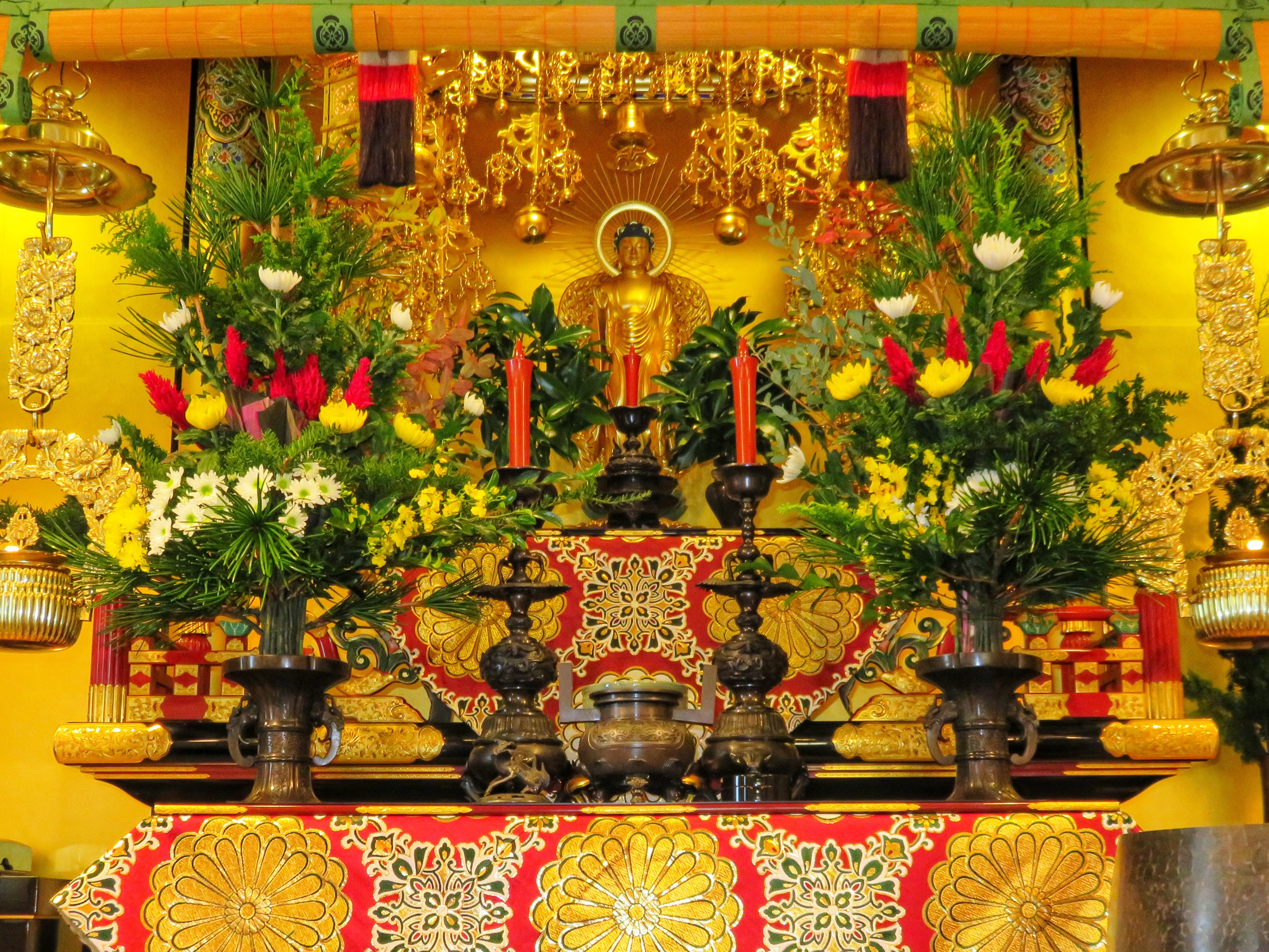
Main altar of Muryoji Temple, Chiba City.

Different Pure Land traditions have different approaches to the practice of Buddhist ethical discipline (sīla), bodhisattva vows, meditation and other traditional practices such as such as study, repentance rites, worship, sutra chanting, vegetarianism, and monasticism. Generally speaking, Chinese and other mainland Pure Land Buddhists affirm these traditional Buddhist practices, which they see as valid and useful methods of making spiritual progress and generating merit which could be dedicated to rebirth in the Pure Land. This was also partly due to the fact that Pure Land in China was never an independent institutional "school", but was just seen as a "dharma gate" practiced within various schools that taught a variety of methods.

Chinese Pure Land authors also had different answers to the question of why we should engage in other classic Buddhist practices (aside from nianfo) if Amitabha Buddha could save all beings no matter how wicked they were. Thus, different Pure Land traditions have different ways to avoid the shared problem of antinomianism, which may arise if someone thinks they are sure to be saved by Amitabha's power and so chooses to do evil deeds or avoid all ethical training.

Many Chinese Pure Land masters exhorted their disciples to both practice ethics, vows and so on and chant the nianfo without attempting to answer the question of why they are both needed if simple nianfo is sufficient for rebirth in the Pure Land as stated in the Contemplation Sutra (Amitayurdhyana). Numerous important Pure Land practitioners were also Vinaya masters and were active in transmitting the precepts.

Chinese masters did give various reasons for why one should do other Buddhist practices including the ethical precepts. Charles B. Jones outlines the following main reasons given in the pre-modern Pure Land literature:

- Wang Rixiu (d. 1173) argues that even though the immoral will still gain rebirth, they will be reborn among the lowest grade of rebirth (as stated in the Contemplation Sutra), which means their progress to Buddhahood while in Sukhavati will still be much slower than those of more ethical people. Thus, other Buddhist practices still have importance since they determine the quality of one's rebirth in Sukhavati. Thus, Yinguang writes that he kept the precepts and practiced meditation because he wanted to "attain the necessary qualifications for a superior-level (上品) rebirth in the Pure Land."
- The Pure Land is an intermediate goal in Pure Land Buddhism, which merely helps one attain the final goal is full Buddhahood. With this in mind, masters like Yuan Hongdao note that it is important to develop the "good roots" (善根) of merit, since this contributes to the attainment of Buddhahood, as well as the attainment of the Pure Land. Indeed, Jones notes that "Yuan says in other places, one's very ability to practice Pure Land depends upon having these good roots."
- According to masters like Yuan Hongdao and Yinguang, the length of time that one spends in the Pure Land before attaining Buddhahood matters, because the faster one attains Buddhahood, the faster one can help all beings as a Buddha. Hence, it makes sense to practice as best as one can now and work for rebirth in the Pure Land as the highest grade possible. Furthermore, other masters like Jixing Chewu state that without the motivation to help all beings, one will not be able to activate the "sympathetic resonance" (gǎnyìng) needed for rebirth in the Pure Land since the Buddha's mind also resonates with compassion. He also argues that true bodhicitta and compassion for all beings entails the desire to attain Buddhahood as quickly as possible.

The practice of abstaining from eating animals or animal by-products called chúnjìng sù (纯净素) in Chinese, translates as pure Buddhist vegetarian/vegan denoting the aspiration and transcendence to higher levels of non-violence through physical practice.

=== Group practice and rituals ===
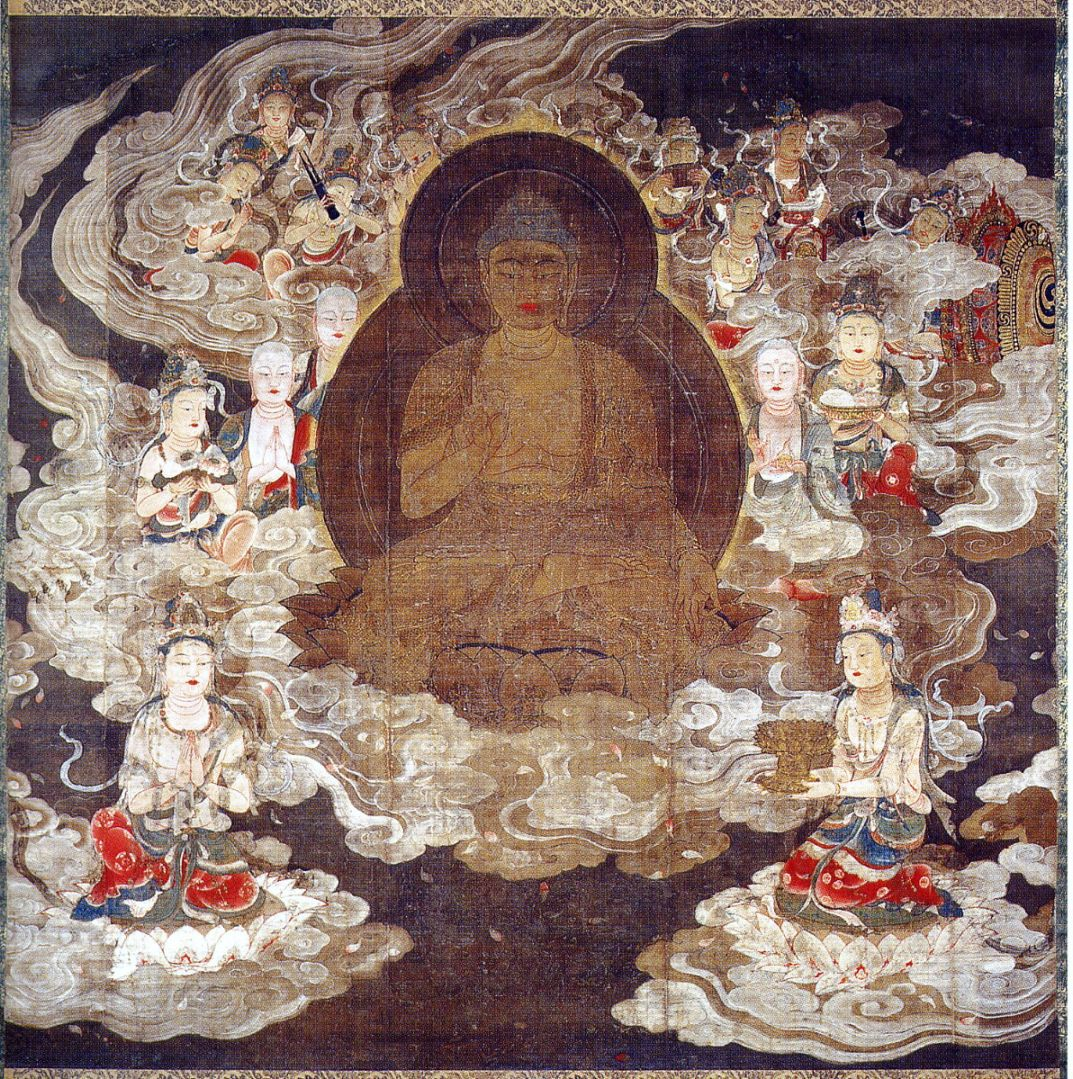
Amida and 25 bodhisattvas, 12th-century, Kongōbu-ji, Kōya-san, Wakayama prefecture. This painting is a raigō, a genre which depicts Amitabha coming to receive a dying person. They were commonly used in deathbed rituals.

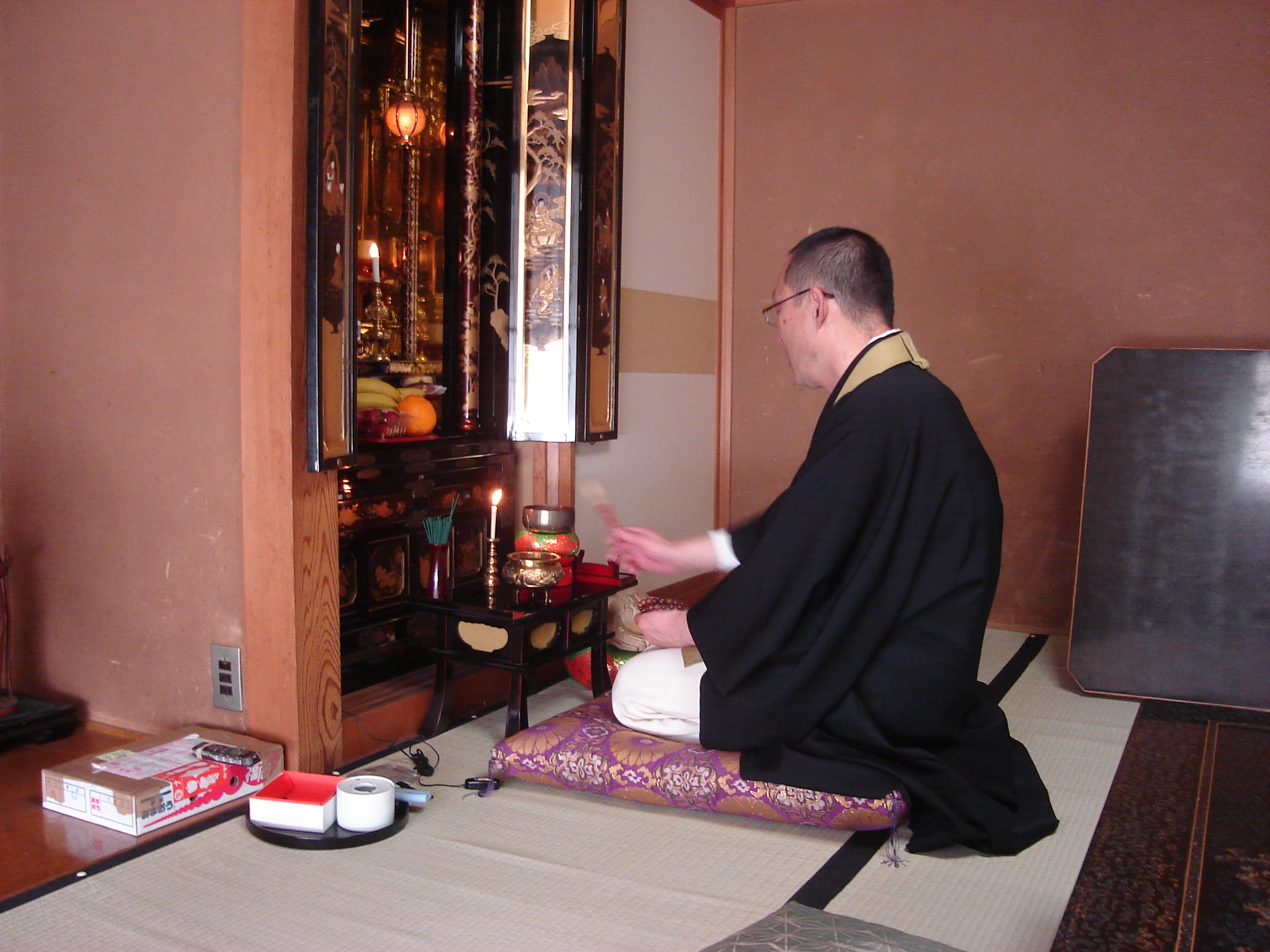
A priest of Jodo-shu in rural Fukui prefecture visits the home of a parishioner to chant a sutra for a deceased family member in front of a butsudan.

Group practice, whether in a ritual setting or in retreat, is a common part of modern Pure Land Buddhism. One important form of ritual in Pure Land Buddhism are death rituals. Death is often assigned a special importance in Pure Land Buddhism. This is because the time of death is seen as a key moment were one could either focus the mind on Amitabha and gain rebirth in the Pure Land or become distracted and troubled by worldly things.

According to Jones, one can find descriptions of such rituals in the memoirs of the Ming dynasty Pure Land teacher Yuan Hongdao (1568–1610). The basic goal of these rituals was to "provide the dying person with an environment free from anything that would distract them from focusing on Amitābha and to offer support by practicing alongside them. At its simplest, family members gathered around the bedside and helped the dying person maintain a constant flow of nianfo, sometimes taking over for them if their breath became too weak." Chinese Buddhists would also be on the lookout for auspicious signs during these rituals, such as visions of Amitabha and bright lights. Over time, deathbed rituals could become very elaborate and funeral specialists developed which focused on these elements of Pure Land practice. They might involve extensive liturgies and works of art depicting Amitabha.

Another form of group practice which is common in Chinese Pure Land Buddhism is the nianfo recitation retreat, where Buddhists come together for intensive recitation practice for several days. These retreats always focus on nianfo recitation (walking or sitting), but might also include chanting of the Pure Land sutras, taking of the eight precepts, silent meditation and Dharma lectures.

Japanese Pure Land Buddhist sects, like Jōdo Shinshū Hongwanji-ha, also perform numerous ritual services for their congregation. Charles B. Jones notes that in this school: "there is an "infant rite" to welcome the birth of a new baby, a "confirmation ceremony" to affirm one's commitment to the Jōdo Shinshū and receive a dharma name, a "wedding ceremony" that unites a couple's marriage vows with a reaffirmation of their commitment to the way of Amitābha, and, of course, funeral rites to commend loved ones to rebirth in the Pure Land. Individual parishioners may also request special services, such as a home visit during which the minister chants the Smaller Sūtra in front of the family buddha-altar (Jp: butsudan), or memorial services to mark the death anniversaries of loved ones." According to Jōdo Shinshū teaching, while these rituals do not actually contribute to one's attainment of the Pure Land (only shinjin does), they still promote virtues like self-reflection, awareness, gratitude and humility.

=== Sutra and dhāraṇī chanting ===
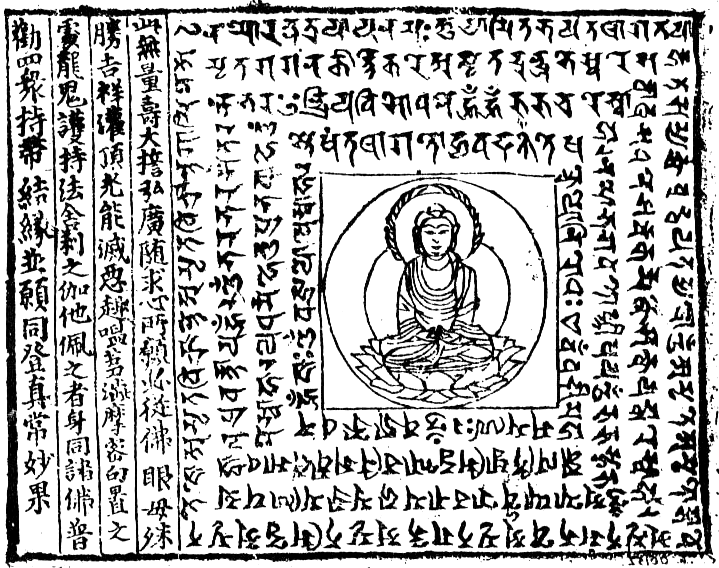
An engraving of a Sanskrit dhāraṇī for Amitābha written in the Siddhaṃ script. Mogao Caves, Dunhuang, China

Another common practice in Pure Land Buddhism is the chanting of sutras (especially the three Pure Land sutras). Sutra chanting was one of the auxiliary methods taught by Pure Land patriarchs like Shandao and Genshin. Modern Pure Land traditions also include the chanting of key Pure Land sutra passages as part of daily recitation (known as Otsutome or Gonyo).

The chanting of dhāraṇīs is another chanting method used in East Asian Buddhist Pure Land. Foundational texts like the Contemplation Sutra and the Larger Sukhavati-vyuha Sutra explicitly acknowledge the "dhāraṇī gateways" as spiritual milestones for practitioners. Chinese Pure Land masters such as Fazhao and Cimin Huiri utilized dhāraṇīs alongside other Pure Land practices. One popular Pure Land dhāraṇī is the Pure Land Rebirth dhāraṇī (往生淨土神咒), also known as the Mantra for Birth in the Pure Land. The repetition of this dhāraṇī (which actually refers to two texts, a long and a short one) is said to be very popular among traditional Chinese Buddhists. It is traditionally preserved in Sanskrit, and it is said that when a devotee succeeds in realizing singleness of mind on it, its true and profound meaning will be clearly revealed. Another dhāraṇī of Amitabha is the Dhāraṇī of Holy Infinite-Life Resolute Radiance King Tathāgata (聖無量壽決定光明王如來陀羅尼). Other popular dhāraṇīs in East Asian Buddhism which is said to lead to birth in Sukhavati include the Great Compassion Dhāraṇī, the Uṣṇīṣa Vijaya Dhāraṇī Sūtra, and the Viśuddhaprabhā Dhāraṇī.

The use of dhāraṇīs as a Pure Land practice permeated Japanese Buddhism during the Heian and Kamakura periods. In classic works like The Tale of Genji, and various Ojoden (Accounts of Rebirth) writings, practitioners are depicted as chanting Pure Land dhāraṇīs many times. The evolution of dhāraṇī use in Japanese Buddhism reached a critical juncture during the era of Hōnen (1133–1212), founder of Jōdo-shū. Hōnen's acknowledged the ritual utility of dhāraṇī, though he categorized them as auxiliary "mixed practices" rather than the "rightly established act" for rebirth. Hōnen's writings suggest a cautious acceptance of some dhāraṇīs used in the Tendai, while firmly rejecting the practice of the more complex esotericism of the advanced tantras. In contemporary Japan, Pure Land denominations like the Chinzei, Seizan, and Ji-shū continue to employ dhāraṇīs in specific liturgical contexts. Modern scholarship suggests that these practices are largely derived from the Tendai Taimitsu tradition.

According to modern Chinese Pure Land master Yinguang, a Pure Land practitioner can recite any mantra or sutra, such as those which are commonly used in Chinese Mahayana (Heart Sutra, Great Compassion mantra, and the Shurangama Mantra). However, he also notes "to be in accord with the tenets of Pure Land" one should also include nianfo into one's recitation practice and also dedicate the merit of the practice to rebirth in the Pure Land.

=== Dual practice with Chan ===
In Chinese Buddhism, there is a common practice called the "dual path of Chan and Pure Land cultivation", which is also called the "dual path of emptiness and existence." As taught by Nan Huai-Chin, the name of Amitābha is recited slowly, and the mind is emptied out after each repetition. When idle thoughts arise, the name is repeated again to clear them. With constant practice, the mind is able to remain peacefully in emptiness, culminating in the attainment of samādhi. Some Chinese masters argued that the practice of Chan by itself was risky, since one did not know if it would bear fruit in this life. Hence, it was better to practice both Chan meditation and nianfo, and in this way, one could at least be ensured of rebirth in the Pure Land. A later development fused the two practices into one, which was called the Pure Land kōan and consisted of practicing nianfo while also asking oneself "Who is performing nianfo?"

Other Chinese meditation masters, particularly in the Chan school, taught nianfo as a secondary method. Thus, while Hanshan Deqing taught nianfo recitation, he saw is as a lesser practice than Chan meditation proper. Similarly, Chan master Xuyun (1840?–1959) subsumed nianfo under a Chan framework which interprets it as a kind of huatou practice.

The method of joint Pure Land and Chan practice was formalized in Korean Buddhism as part of the "Three Gates" (sammun) schema which taught nianfo, Seon meditation and doctrinal study. This system was first articulated by Ch’ongheo Hyujong in the 17th century, who held that the three practices work together.

The eclectic practice of Chan and Pure Land (along with other classic Buddhist practices and rituals) are also a common feature of Vietnamese Buddhism. The dual practice of Zen meditation along with recitation of Amitabha's name is also common in the Japanese Ōbaku school of Buddhism.

=== Benefits ===
Pure Land practice is primarily said to lead to rebirth in Amitabha's Pure Land and thus the bodhisattva stage of non-retrogression (since at the point one has reached the Pure Land, one will not fall back from this to a lower realm). This Pure Land is often described as a kind of way station or hostel (旅館) outside of the triple world of samsara. It is a place that lacks suffering and which allows someone to practice the bodhisattva path without difficulties. However, Pure Land authors also report other benefits of practicing Pure Land which appear in this life. Benefits include the buddha-contemplation samādhi, purification of the mind, and elimination of bad karma.

Various worldly benefits of nianfo practice have also been reported by Pure Land masters at least since the Song dynasty. For example, when Tiantai master Siming Zhili (960–1028) organized a Pure Land society, he said that the society's practice would "extend the emperor's longevity (壽) and contribute to the prosperity (祿) of the people." Yinguang said he had been healed of conjunctivitis by the practice. Thus, some traditional Chinese sources use nianfo as a health incantation with numerous benefits. These benefits can be found in sources like "Forty-Eight Ways to Nianfo" (念佛四十八法) by Zheng Wei'an and other traditional Chinese medical text.

== In Himalayan Buddhism ==
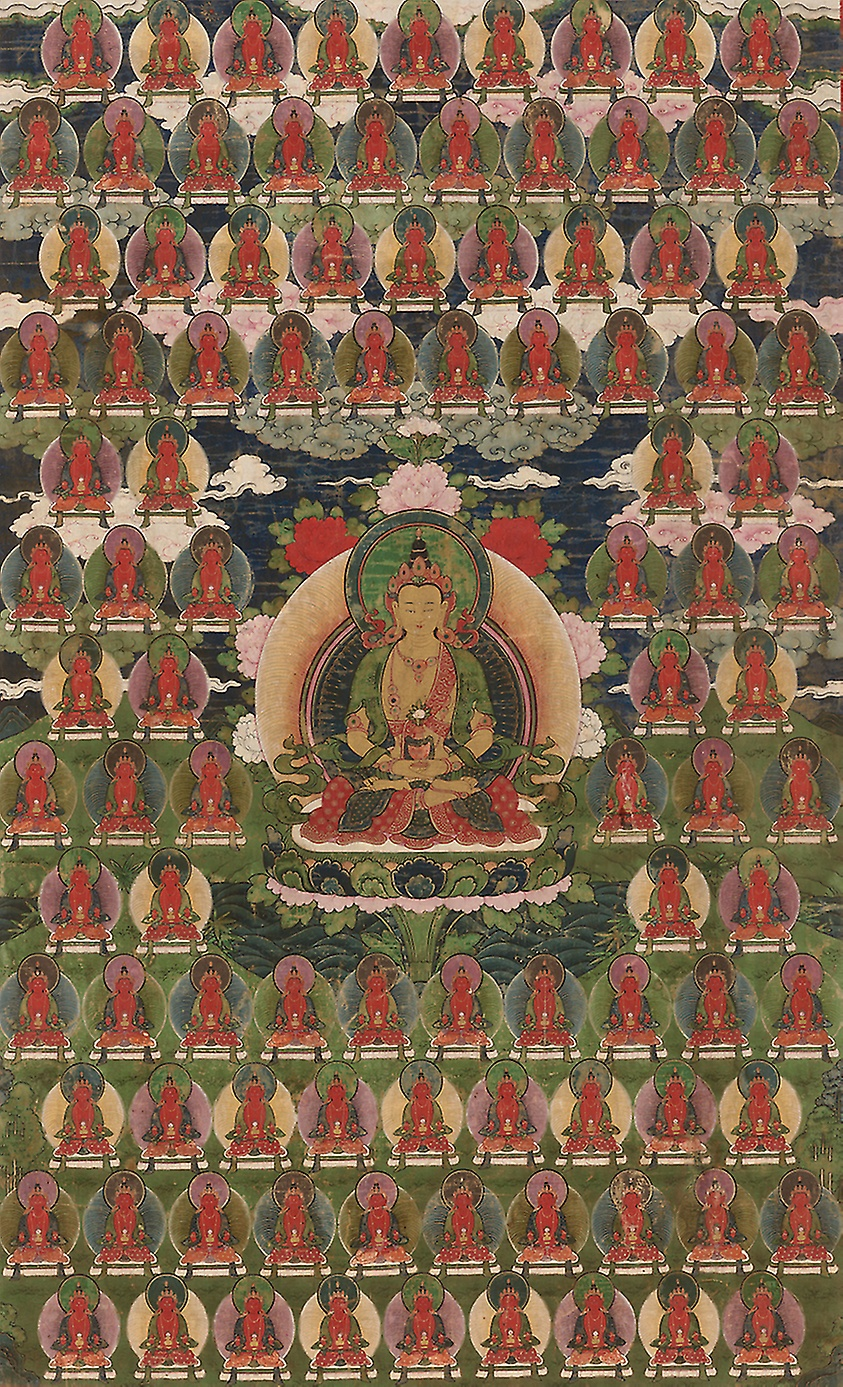
Tibetan thangka of Amitabha

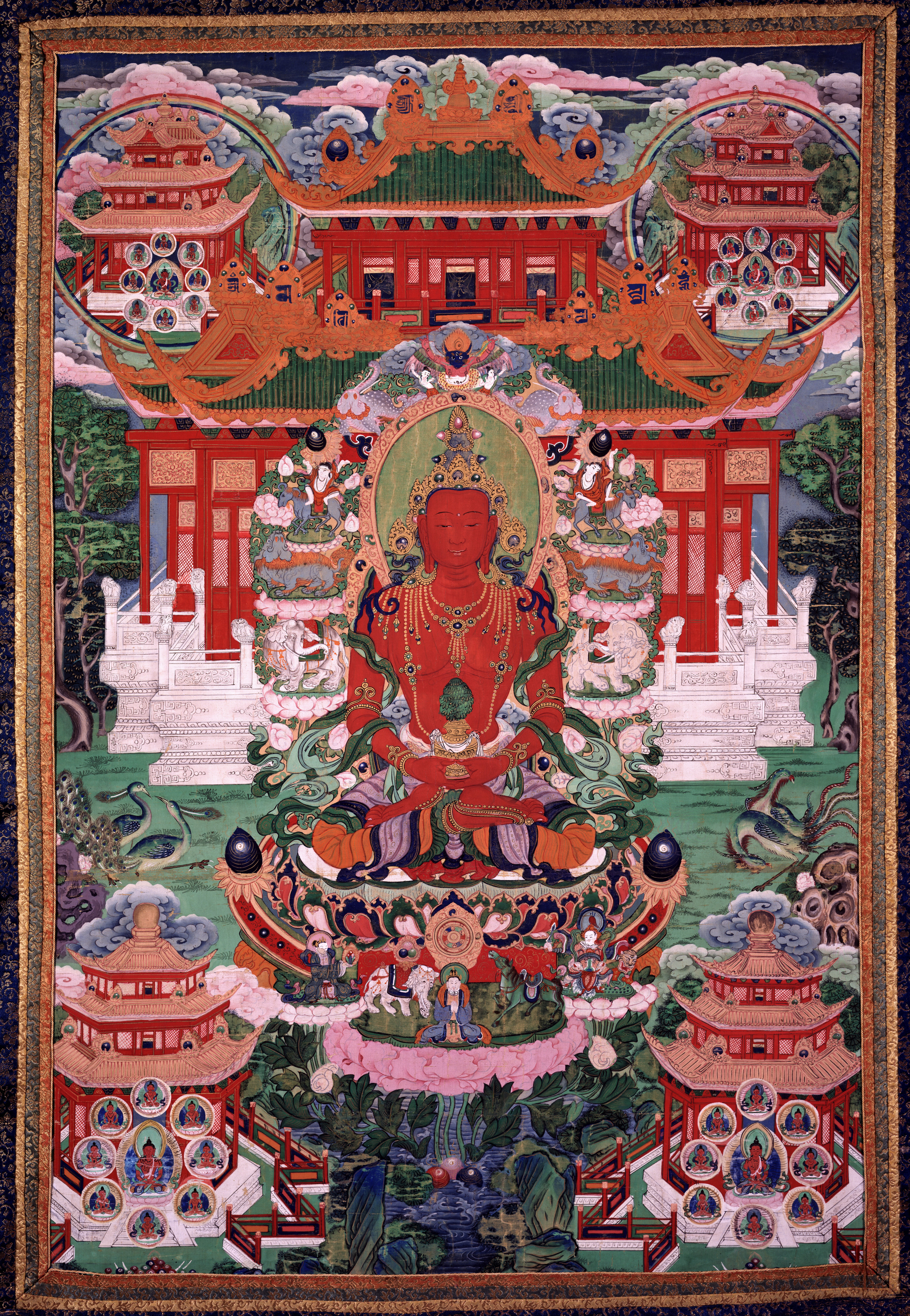
Amitayus in Sukhavati, 18th century.

In Tibetan Buddhism, which is a Vajrayana tradition, various practices and ideas which are focused on rebirth in the Buddhafield of Amitabha (as well as other Buddhas) exist as part of the vast repertoire of Buddhist practices found in this tradition. These include exoteric (or sutra) and esoteric (or tantric) forms of Buddhist practice focused on the Buddha Amitabha and his buddhafield of Sukhavati. Matthew Kapstein writes that "Sukhavati has long been an important focal point for much of Tibetan devotion," especially among lay devotees who commonly revere Amitabha, Avalokiteshvara and Padmasambhava as three bodies of a single Buddha. He also notes that such an orientation also exists in Nepalese Buddhism.

Georgios T. Halkias notes that the term "Pure Land" can be used in reference to these Tibetan practices and scriptures which are analogous to East Asian Pure Land Buddhist practices. However, he also notes that there has never been a "sectarian, self-conscious movement of Pure Land Buddhism in Tibet" which saw itself as independent of the larger doctrinal and practical worldview of Tibetan Buddhism as a whole. As such, Pure Land practices in Tibetan Buddhism are considered one element or orientation within the broader Himalayan Buddhist tradition.

Pure Land Buddhism in Tibet has a long and innovative history dating from the era of the Tibetan Empire (8th–9th centuries), with the translation of the Sukhāvatīvyūha sūtras into Tibetan. Tibetan documents from Dunhuang also prove that by the 8th and 9th centuries, Sukhavati and Amitabha were important to Tibetan Buddhists. The Tibetan Canon also includes numerous other Sukhavati-Amitabha oriented texts, including various dharanis (incantations/spells) which are believed to lead one to Sukhavati. These include the Cloud of Offerings Dharani, Dharani-Mantra of Amitabha, Recollection of Amitabha, Dharani of the Essence of Aparimitayus, Dharani in Praise of Immeasurable Qualities. However, there are also many other sources which mention other Pure Lands aside from Sukhavati, which shows that this was not the only Pure Land sought after by Tibetan Buddhists during the first and second disseminations of Buddhism.

=== Tibetan works ===
Tibetan compositions of pure-land prayers and artistic renditions of Sukhāvatī in Central Asia date to that time. Tibetan pure-land literature forms a distinct genre and encompasses a wide range of texts, including aspirational and devotional prayers for rebirth in Sukhavati (Tib. bde-smon), commentaries (’grel-ba) by scholars which discuss Pure Land practice, and esoteric meditations and rituals belonging to the Vajrayāna tradition which focus on rebirth in the Pure land and on the deity Amitābha. The composition of Pure Land oriented literature was popular among major Tibetan Buddhist figures. For example, both Sakya Pandita (a key figure for the Sakya school) and Tsongkhapa (the founder of the Gelug school), composed Sukhavati-oriented works.

Tibetan commentaries focusing on Amitabha and Sukhavati, like The First Panchen Lama's (1567–1662) Swift and Unobstructed Path to Sukhavati, teach methods to attain the Pure Land. In this text, the First Panchen Lama advises that one may use a thangka painting or a statue to help visualize Amitabha in his Pure Land while maintaining a mind oriented towards the good of all beings. The commentary also says that one should infuse all daily activities with this practice.

Another important commentary on Pure Land practice, Training for Sukhavati with Luminous Faith: Sun-like Instructions of a Sage, was composed by the Nyingma scholar Ju Mipham (1846–1912). His work is a classic of the genre and draws on numerous other texts to explain how Pure Land practice works through a synthesis of the "ripening force of individual beings" (sems-can rang-rang gi stobs smin-pa), the "power of reality's potency" (dngos-po'i nus-pa) and the power of Amitābha's aspirations (smon-lam) and wisdom (ye-shes).

According to Mipham, rebirth in Sukhavati is an excellent path to nirvana and is based on four causes: recollecting Buddha Amitabha, accumulating countless virtues, generating bodhicitta, and dedicating one's virtues to rebirth in Sukhavati. Recollecting the Buddha with faith and a strong aspiration to be born in Sukhavati are the main causes, while the others are secondary. Mipham also discusses the three major hindrances to birth in Sukhavati: lack of understanding, wrong views and doubt. He also recommends reading, reciting, writing and meditating on the Sukhavati sutras.

Amitabha is generally understood as a specific Buddha, one of the Five Tathagathas, some of the most prominent Buddhas in the tradition. However, in some Tibetan Buddhist writings, Amitabha is equated with the Dharmakaya and with the Dzogchen concept of the basis or ground (gzhi). For example, the great 19th century Dzogchen master Dudjom Lingpa (khrag 'thung bdud 'joms rdo rje), writes: "Emaho, in the self-manifest, pure expanse that is the real Akanistha, the magical field that is gnosis arrayed, is the Dharmakaya of the ground, the conqueror Amitabha." Thus, Matthew Kapstein writes that in this Dzogchen understanding of Amitabha, Sukhavati is "no longer the name of a particular paradise, but rather a metonymic expression for the primordial ground in which the Buddha's gnosis is disclosed."

=== Tibetan practices ===
It seems that from the 11th century onwards, Amitabha and Sukhavati became increasingly popular, and this pure land became the most widespread destination sought by Pure Land rituals and contemplations. Amitabha-focused tantric practices seem to have become widespread at least partly due to the efforts of the Indian tantric scholar Jitāri / Jetari. One of these practices was popularized by the Sakya school and was a contemplation that one performed just before falling asleep, in which one visualized Sukhavati and the Buddha Amitabha. This "sleep-meditation" (nyal-bsgom) continues to be transmitted in the Sakya school until the present day.

One of the simplest popular practices which Tibetan Buddhists consider to lead to rebirth in Sukhavati is the recitation of the six-syllable mantra (Om mani padme hum) of Avalokitesvara. According to Lama Zopa, this mantra can lead to Avalokitesvara's Potala Pure Land or Sukhavati.

Pure Land works based on Amitabha are found in various other Tibetan textual collections, such as in the compositions of Tibetan masters like Dolpopa Sherab Gyaltsen (1292–1361), Namchö Mingyur Dorje (1645–1667) and Karma Chagme (1613–1678). Dolpopa is known to have written a commentary on the Larger Sukhāvatīvyuha sutra entitled The supreme means whereby self and others may be reborn in Sukhāvatī. According to Georgios T. Halkias, Mingyur Dorje's Namcho Terma Cycle "contains a unique assortment of ritual practices devoted exclusively to the realization of Sukhāvatī" called The Means of Attaining the Sukhāvatī Kṣetra, which "represents the most original and systematic anthology of Tibetan Pure Land rituals to date." This terma includes phowa practices and extensive visualization exercises where the main mandala is Sukhavati.

The esoteric practice of phowa (mind transference, Sanskrit: *saṃkrānti) is a unique part of Tibetan Pure Land practice which is found in various terma (revealed treasure) works like The Standing Blade of Grass (Tib. 'Pho-ba 'Jag-tshug ma) by the Nyingma master Nyida Sangye (14th century) and Namchö Mingyur Dorje's Namcho Terma. Phowa is an esoteric technique which ejects the mind stream through the crown of the head directly to Sukhavati at the moment of death. This technique is found as one of the Six Dharmas of Naropa. Since phowa specialists are said to be able to guide the minds of other people at death to Sukhavati, phowa also became a popular ritual that came to be performed for the dying by lamas.

Another important tradition in Tibetan Buddhism are tantric practices based around Amitayus (another name for Amitabha, meaning Infinite Life) which focuses on the longevity and life-giving powers of this Buddha.

There are many other treasure texts (termas) associated with Pure Land practice and tertön Longsal Nyingpo (1625–1682/92 or 1685–1752) of Katok Monastery revealed a terma on the pure land.

== See also ==
- Faith in Buddhism
- Ippen
- Transfer of merit
- Vyuha
