= Yunyan =

Yunyan may refer to Yunyan Tansheng (雲巖曇晟), a Buddhist monk who lived in China during the Tang dynasty.

Yunyan may also refer to the following locations in China:

- Yunyan District (云岩区), Guiyang
- Yunyan Pagoda (云岩寺塔), Chinese pagoda in Suzhou
- Yunyan, Lechang (云岩镇), town in Guangdong
