= Xianzi =

Xianzi (Chinese: 獻子; lit. 'Viscount Xian') is a common posthumous name of Eastern Zhou feudal lords. It may refer to:

- Fan Xianzi
- Han Xianzi
- Wei Xianzi
- Zhao Xianzi
- Zhonghang Xianzi

== Other uses ==
- Xianzi (monk)
- Zhang Xianzi, Chinese singer
- Xianzi (activist), Zhou Xiaoxuan, participant in China's #MeToo movement
- Xianzi (musical instrument)
