= Ten Bulls =

Poems and drawings in the Zen tradition

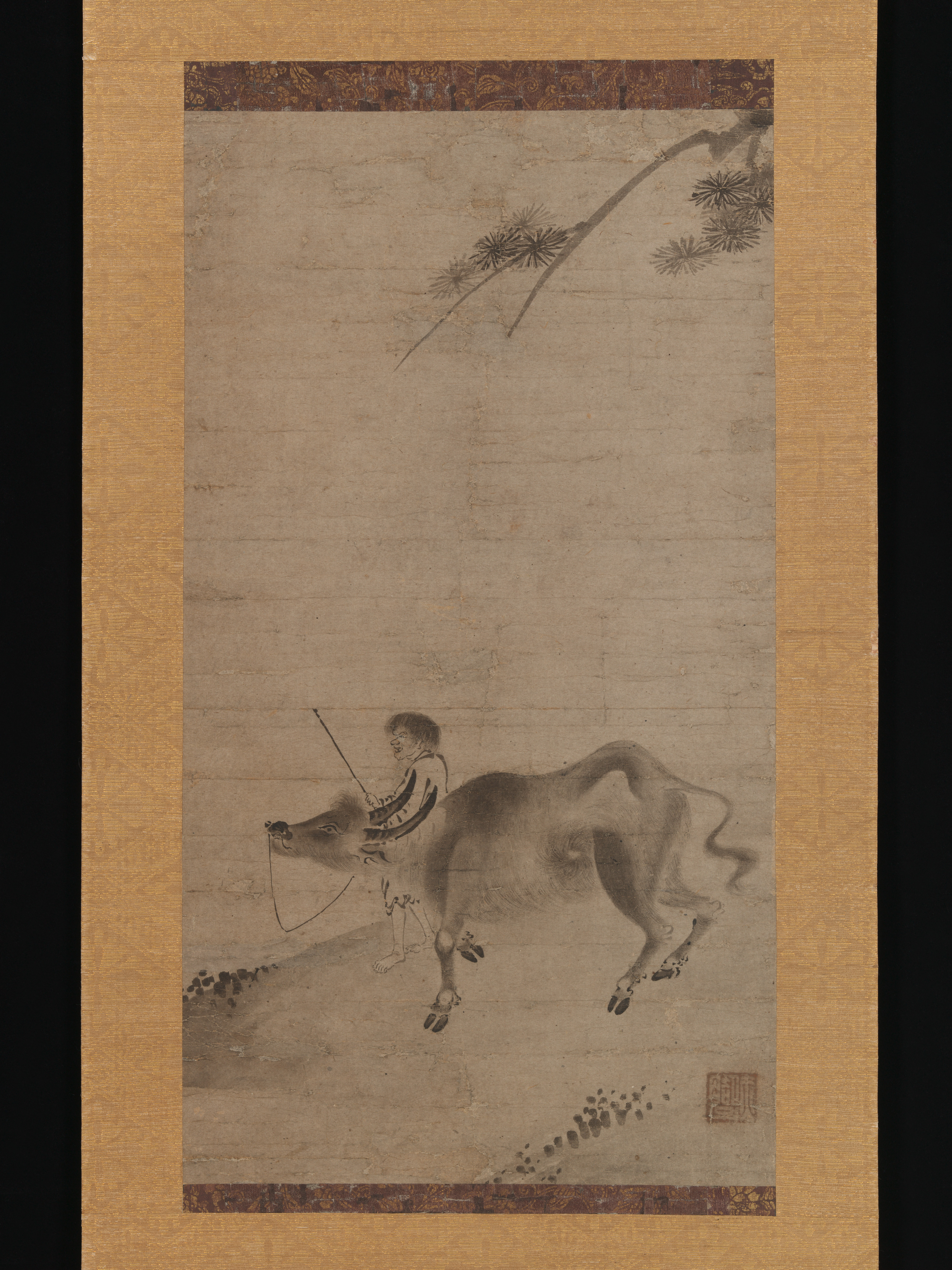
15th century Japanese hanging scroll depicting a scene from the Oxherding sequence.

Ten Bulls or Ten Ox Herding Pictures (Chinese: shíniú 十牛, Japanese: jūgyūzu 十牛図, korean: sipwoo 십우) is a series of short poems and accompanying drawings used in the Zen tradition to describe the stages of a practitioner's progress toward awakening, and their subsequent return to society to enact wisdom and compassion. Inspired by Indian Buddhist teachings, the pictures emerged in Song Dynasty China and spread among the Chan/Zen tradition throughout East Asia.

== History ==
=== Indian background ===
The calf, bull, or ox is one of the earliest similes for meditation practice. It comes from the Maha Gopalaka Sutta (Majjhima Nikaya 33). It is also used in the commentaries, especially the one on the Maha Satipatthana Sutta (Digha Nikaya 22) and the Satipatthana Sutta (Majjhima Nikaya 10). In Indian Buddhism, the simile of the bull is compatible to the ancient traditional Chinese view within cosmology that includes the zodiacal Ox (niú 牛) as a birth year and quality, as a result this similarity helped with the early assimilation of Buddhism into Chinese culture and then on to the rest of East Asia. Buddhaghosa, in his commentary on the Satipatthana Suttas, gives a simile of the taming of a wild calf. The calf is the wild mind which is to be tamed. The same idea was developed by the Chan/Zen tradition.

=== Chinese origin ===
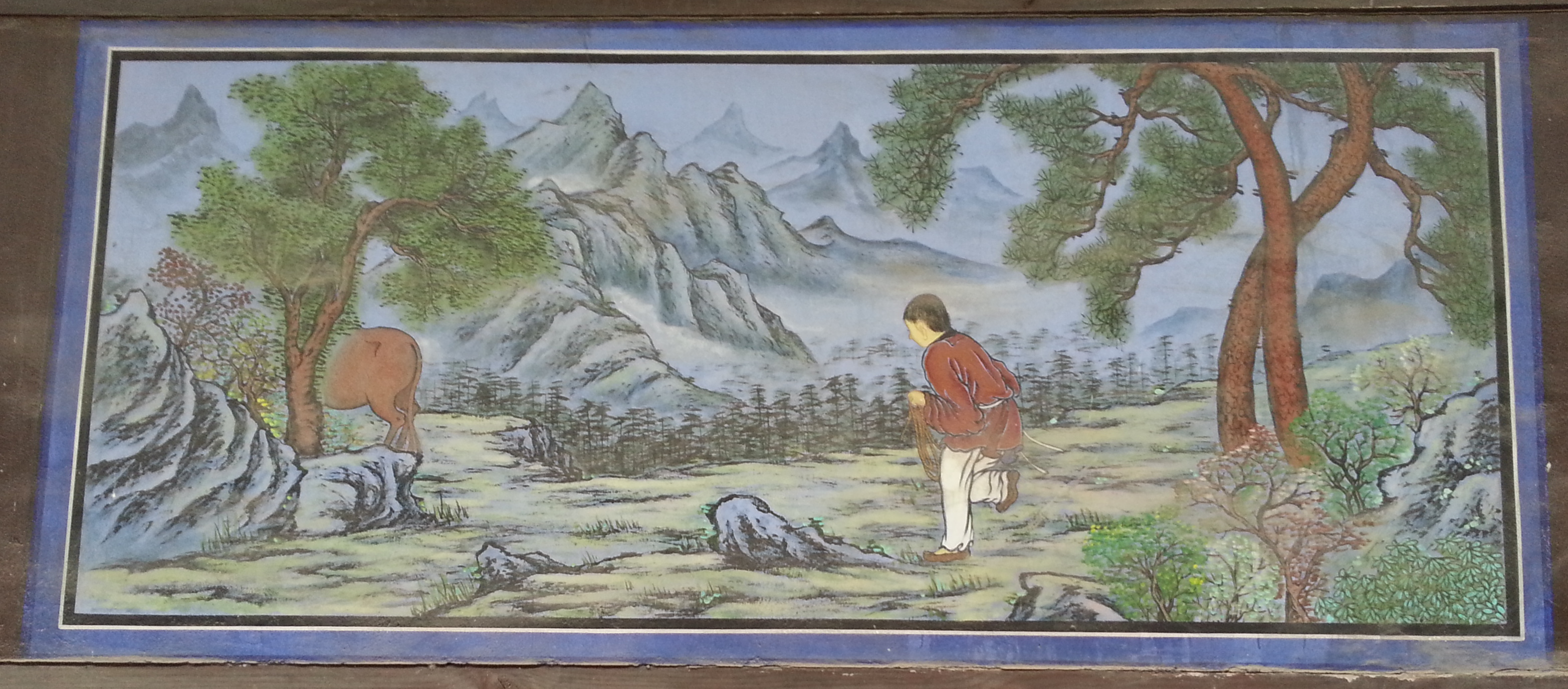
Seeing the ox, an Ox-herding picture on an outdoor wall in Bongeunsa, South Korea.

The well-known ten ox-herding pictures emerged in China in the 12th century. D.T. Suzuki mentions four Chinese versions of the Ten Bulls, by Ching-chu (Jp. Seikyo, c. 11th century), Tzu-te Hui (Jp. Jitoku, c. 1090-1159), an unknown author, and Kuoan Shiyuan (Jp. Kaku-an) (c. 12th century). (Note: Terebess Online, Oxherding Pictures Index)

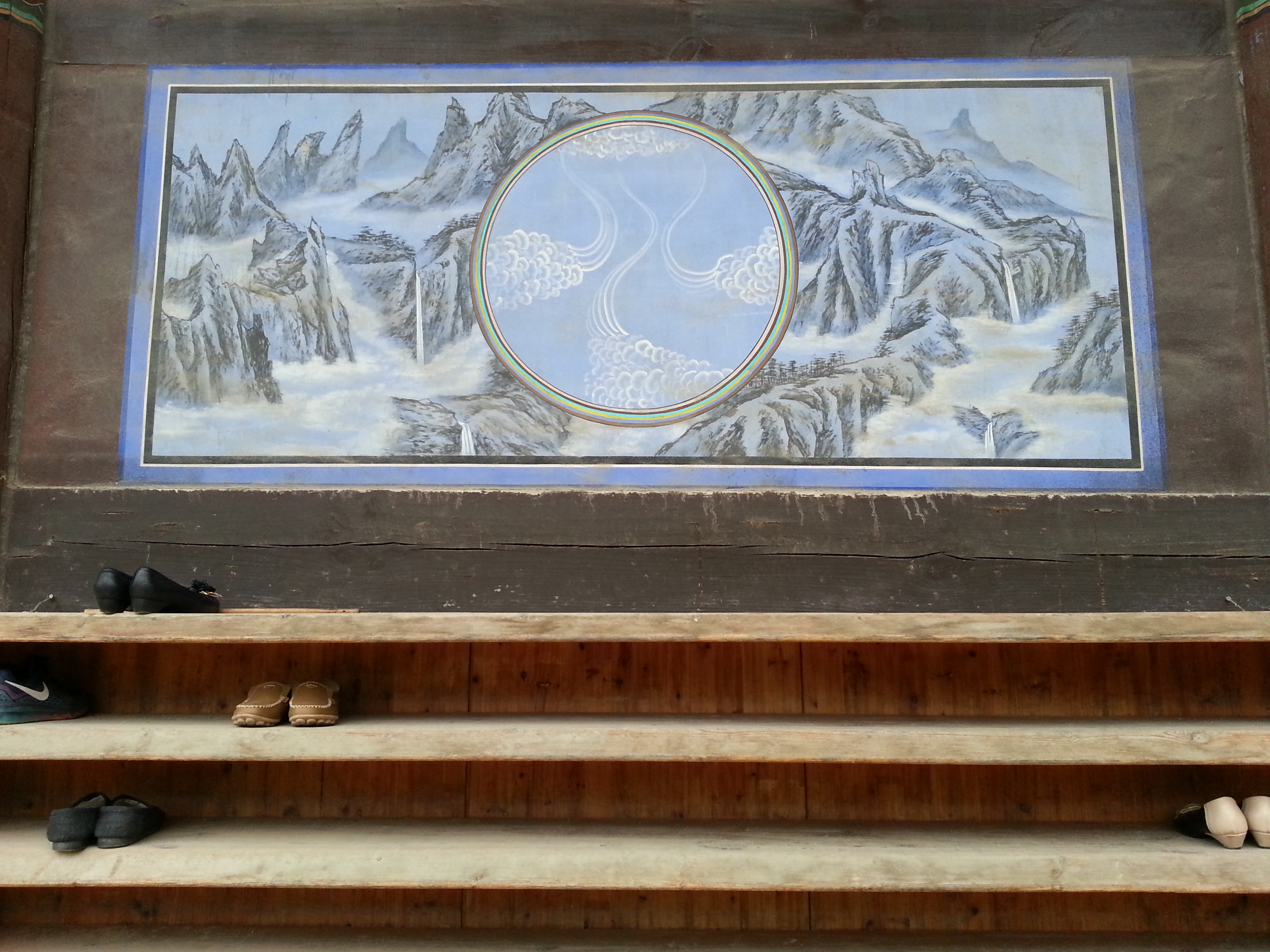
Bongeunsa oxherding picture depicting the state of transcendence, emptiness, and no-mind.

The first series was probably made by Ching-chu in the 11th century, who may have been a contemporary of Kuòān Shīyuǎn. There are only five pictures in Ching-chu's version and the ox's colour changes from dark to white, representing the gradual development of the practitioner, ending in the disappearance of the practitioner.

Tzu-te Hui (自得慧暉, Zide Huihui; Jp. Jitoku ki) (1090-1159) made a version with six pictures. The sixth one goes beyond the stage of absolute emptiness, where Ching-chu's version ends. Just like Ching-chu's version, the ox grows whiter along the way. (Note: See Terebess Asia Online, Three Oxherding Versions Compared)

A third version by an unknown author, with ten pictures, was the most popular in China. It derives from the Ching-chu and Tzu-te Hui series of pictures, and has a somewhat different series of pictures compared to Shiyuan's version. (Note: Terebess Asia Online, Three Oxherding Versions Compared) The 1585 edition contains a preface by Chu-hung, and it has ten pictures, each of which is preceded by Pu-ming's poem, of whom Chu-hung provides no further information. In this version, the ox's colour changes from dark to white.

The most famous version of the oxherding pictures was drawn by the 12th century Chinese Rinzai Chan/Zen master Kuoan Shiyuan (廓庵師遠, Kuòān Shīyuǎn; Jp. Kaku-an Shi-en), who also wrote accompanying poems and introductory words attached to the pictures. In Shiyuan's version, there is no whitening process, and his series also doesn't end with mere emptiness, or absolute truth, but shows a return to the world, depicting Budai ("Laughing Buddha"), who is the bodhisattva Maitreya.

Liaoan Qingyu (了菴清欲, Jp. Ryōan Seiyoku) (1288-1363) made another version with five pictures. (Note: terebess, Five Oxherding Verses)

=== Illustrations ===
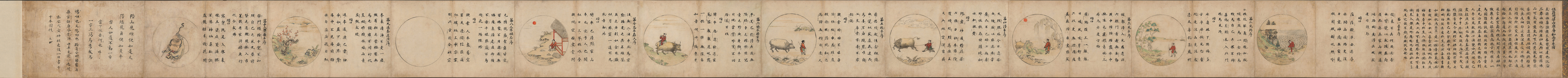
"Illustration and Preface of the Ten Oxherding Pictures", Japan (1278), currently housed in the Metropolitan Museum of Art

In Japan, Kuoan Shiyuan's version gained a wide circulation, and many variations of these illustrations were made, the earliest one probably belonging to the fifteenth century. The following illustrations include the verses by Kuòān Shīyuǎn translated by Nyogen Senzaki (千崎如幻) (1876–1958) and Paul Reps (1895-1990). The paintings below are traditionally attributed to the Japanese monk painter Tenshō Shūbun (天章周文) (1414-1463). (Note: therebess, Harada Shōdō commentary)

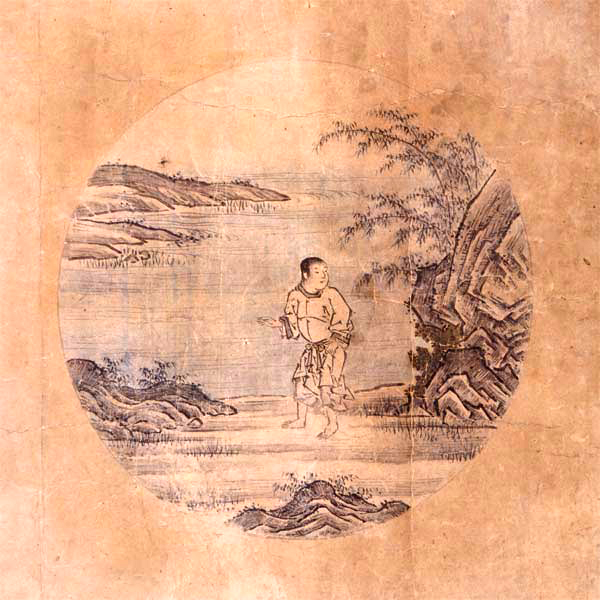
1. In Search of the Bull
In the pasture of the world,
I endlessly push aside the tall
grasses in search of the Ox.
Following unnamed rivers,
lost upon the interpenetrating
paths of distant mountains,
My strength failing and my vitality exhausted, I cannot find the Ox.

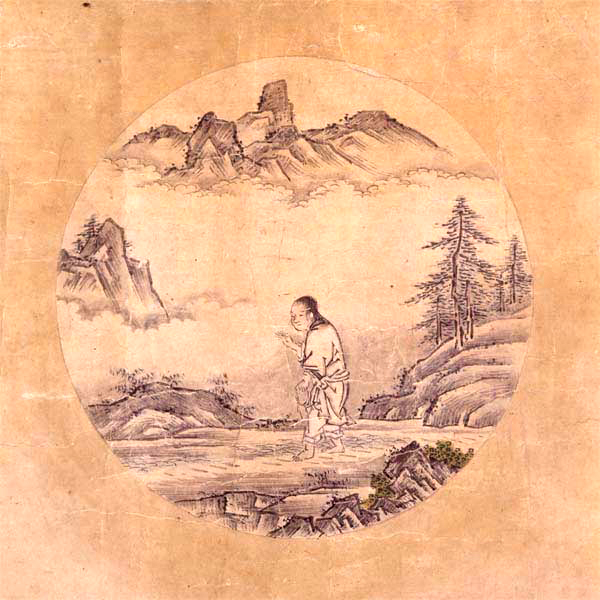
2. Discovery of the Footprints
Along the riverbank under the trees,
I discover footprints.
Even under the fragrant grass,
I see his prints.
Deep in remote mountains they are found.
These traces can no more be hidden
than one's nose, looking heavenward.

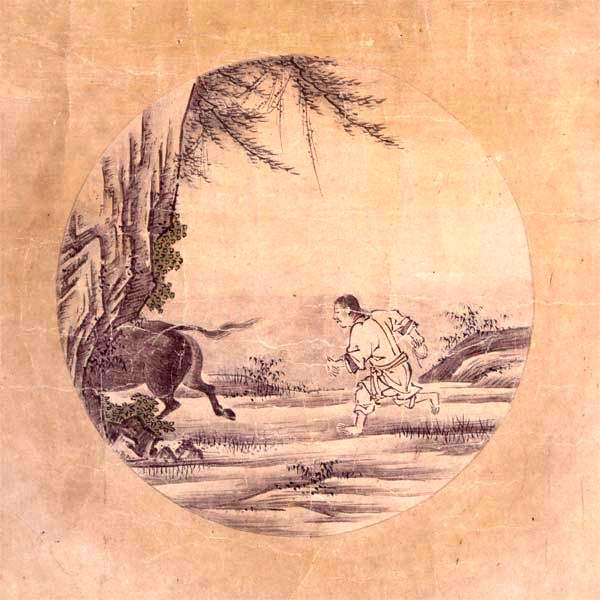
3. Perceiving the Bull
I hear the song of the nightingale.
The sun is warm, the wind is mild,
willows are green along the shore -
Here no Ox can hide!
What artist can draw that massive head,
those majestic horns?

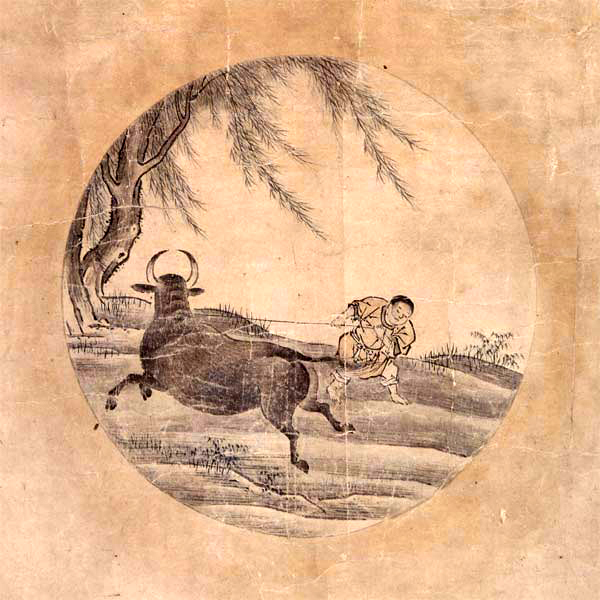
4. Catching the Bull
I seize him with a terrific struggle.
His great will and power
are inexhaustible.
He charges to the high plateau
far above the cloud-mists,
Or in an impenetrable ravine he stands.

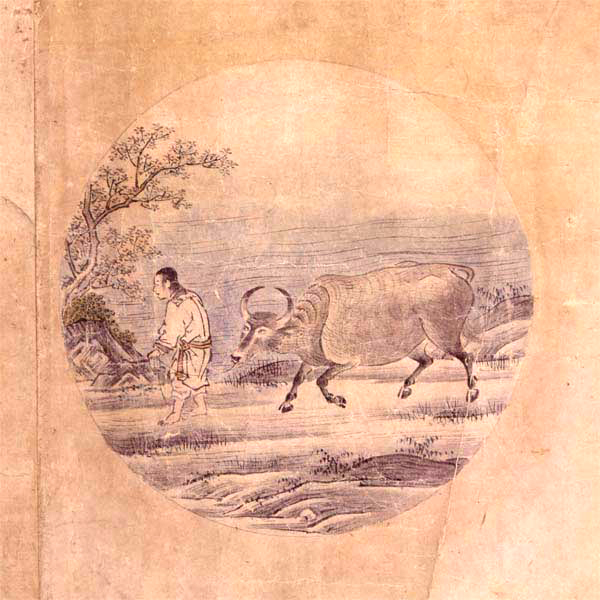
5. Taming the Bull
The whip and rope are necessary,
Else he might stray off down
some dusty road.
Being well-trained, he becomes
naturally gentle.
Then, unfettered, he obeys his master.

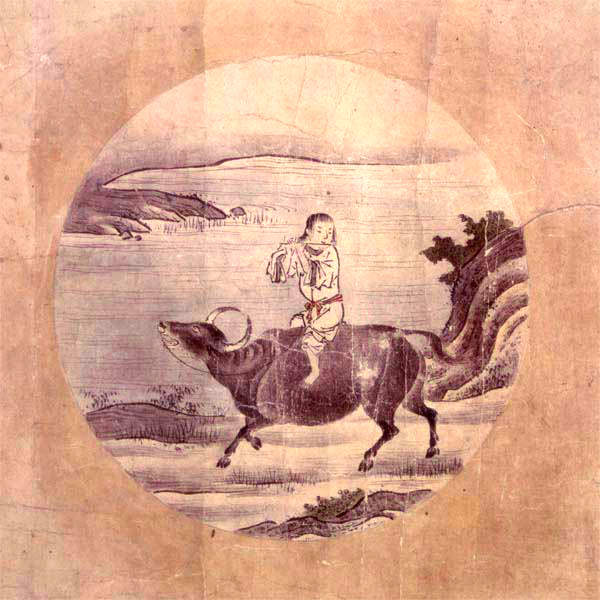
6. Riding the Bull Home
Mounting the Ox, slowly
I return homeward.
The voice of my flute intones
through the evening.
Measuring with hand-beats
the pulsating harmony,
I direct the endless rhythm.
Whoever hears this melody
will join me.

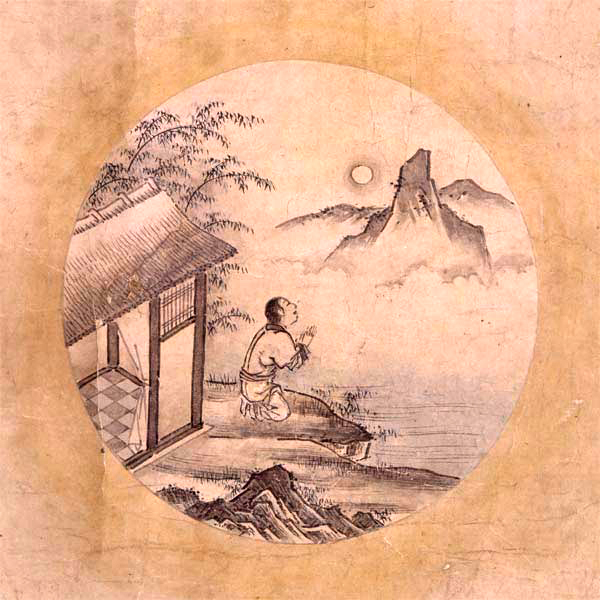
7. The Bull Transcended
Astride the Ox, I reach home.
I am serene. The Ox too can rest.
The dawn has come. In blissful repose,
Within my thatched dwelling
I have abandoned the whip and ropes.

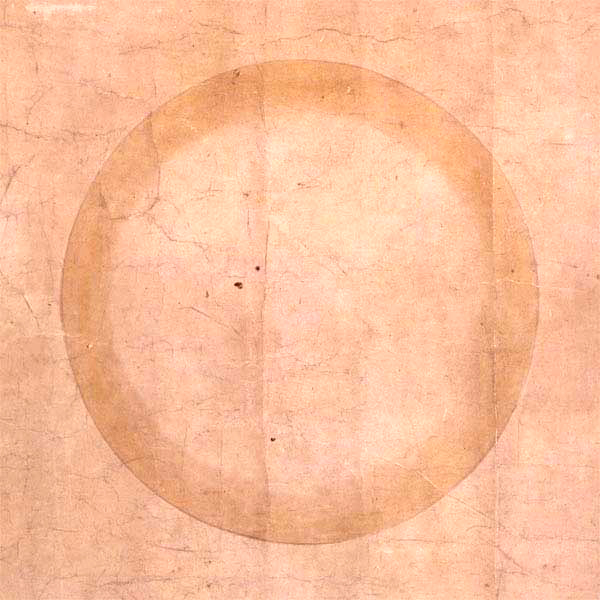
8. Both Bull and Self Transcended
Whip, rope, person, and Ox -
all merge in No Thing.
This heaven is so vast,
no message can stain it.
How may a snowflake exist
in a raging fire.
Here are the footprints of
the Ancestors.

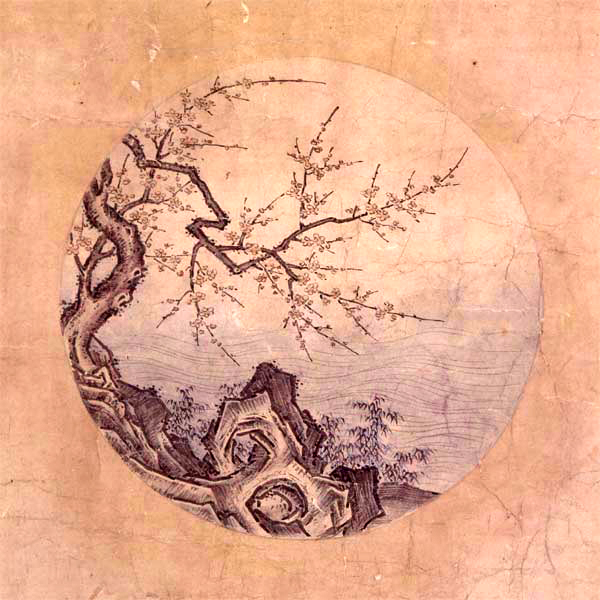
9. Reaching the Source
Too many steps have been taken
returning to the root and the source.
Better to have been blind and deaf
from the beginning!
Dwelling in one's true abode,
unconcerned with and without -
The river flows tranquilly on
and the flowers are red.

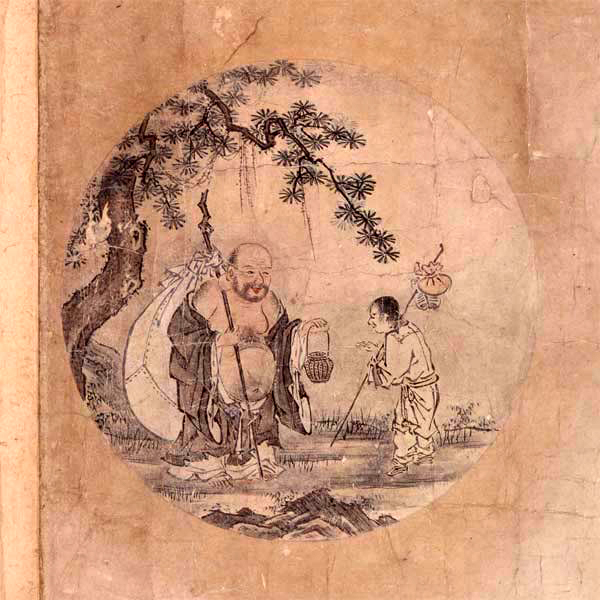
10. Return to Society
Barefooted and naked of breast,
I mingle with the people of the world.
My clothes are ragged and dust-laden,
and I am ever blissful.
I use no magic to extend my life;
Now, before me, the dead trees
become alive.

==== Karasumaru Mitsuhiro's set ====
The following set was drawn by the court calligrapher Karasumaru Mitsuhiro (1579–1638). The set includes ten waka (Japanese poems in thirty-one syllables) rendered in high Heian period Japanese calligraphic style.

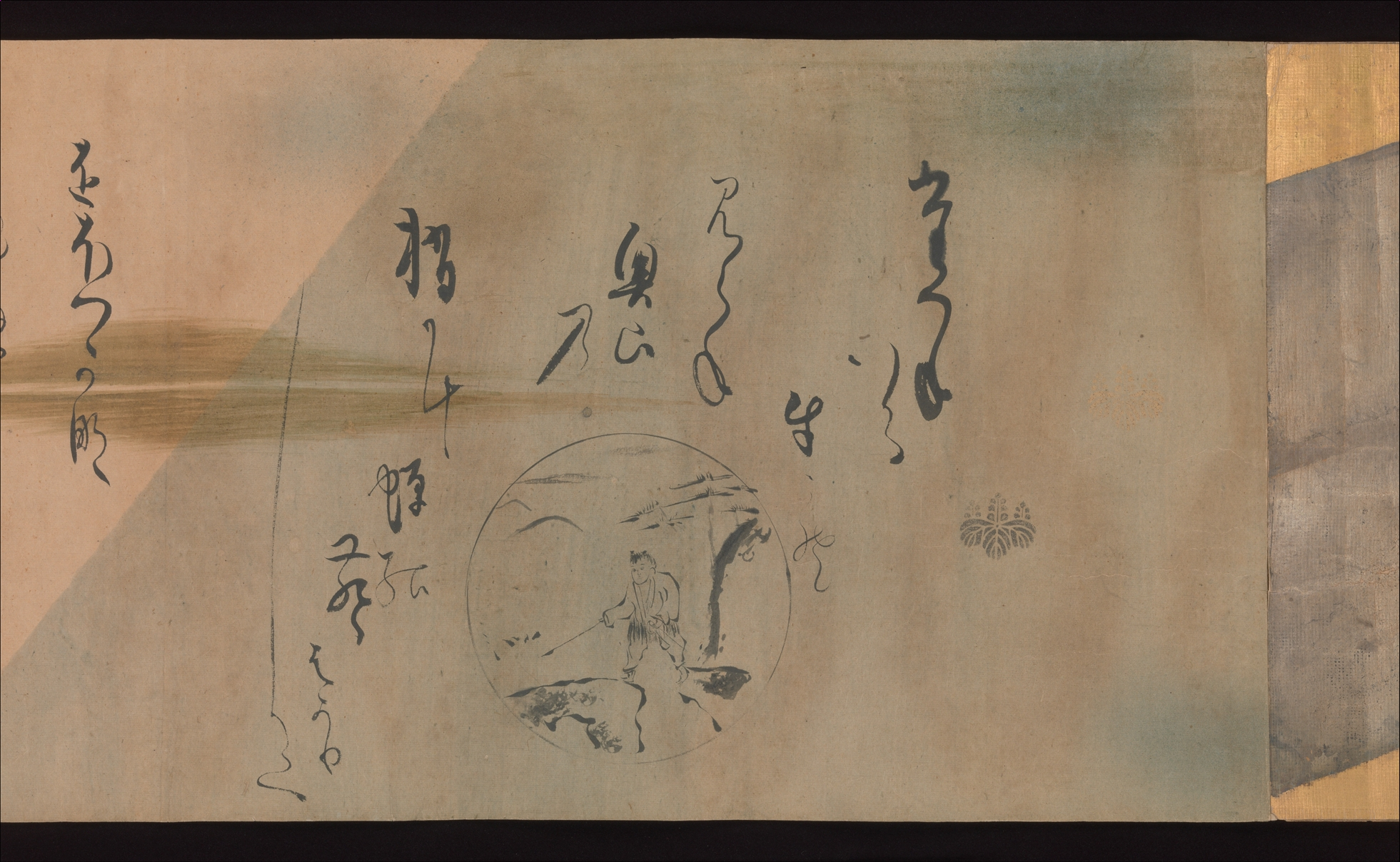

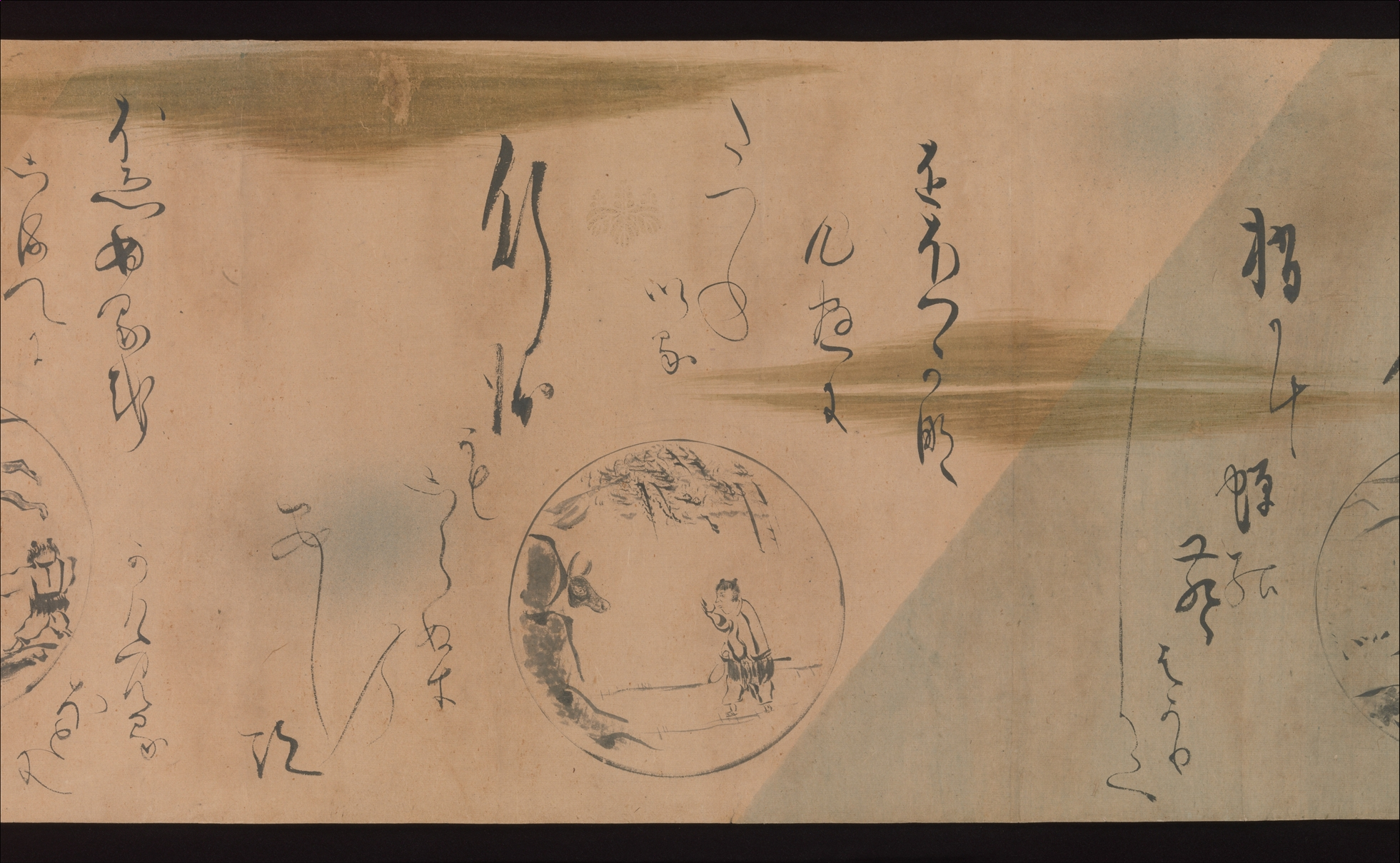

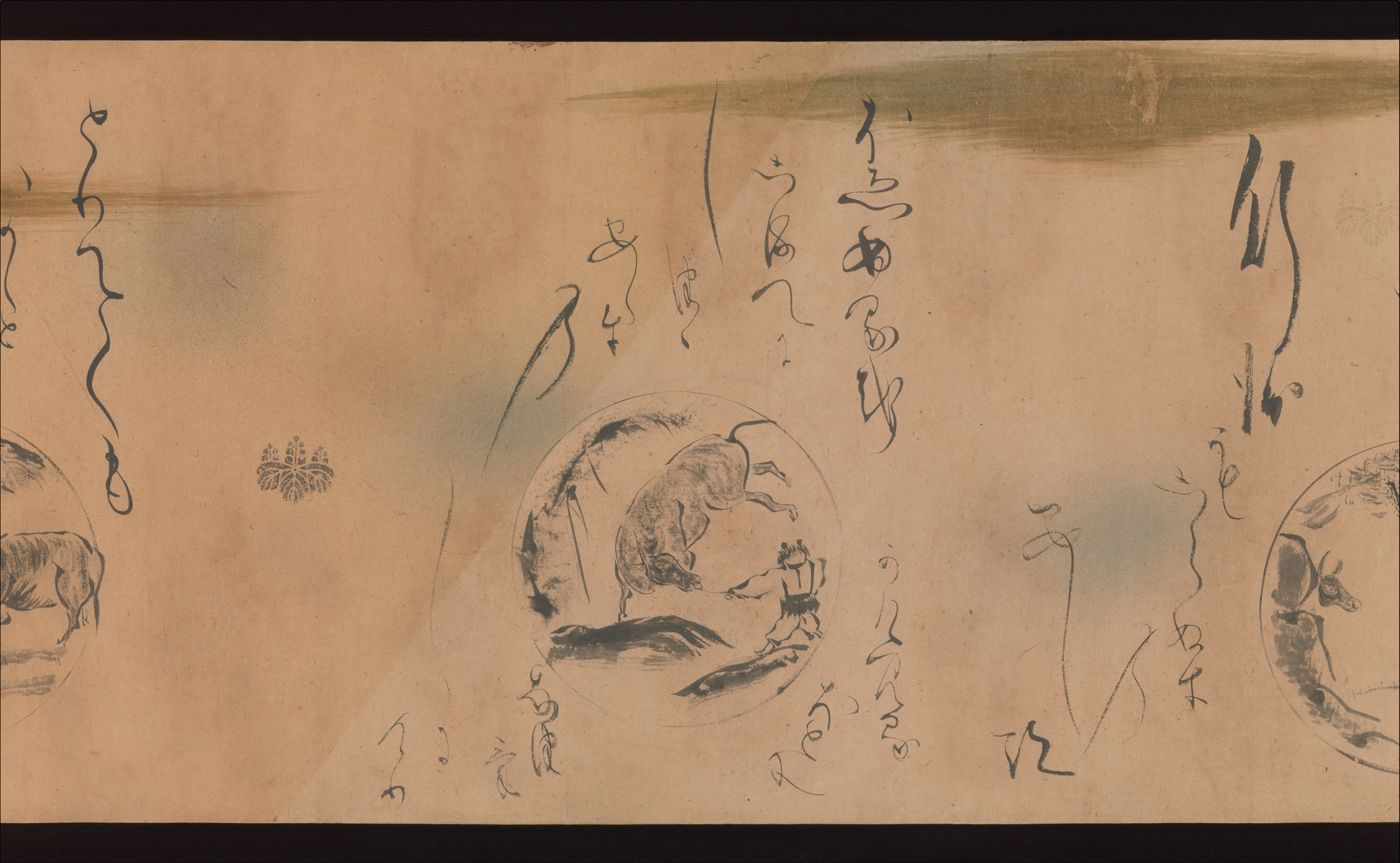

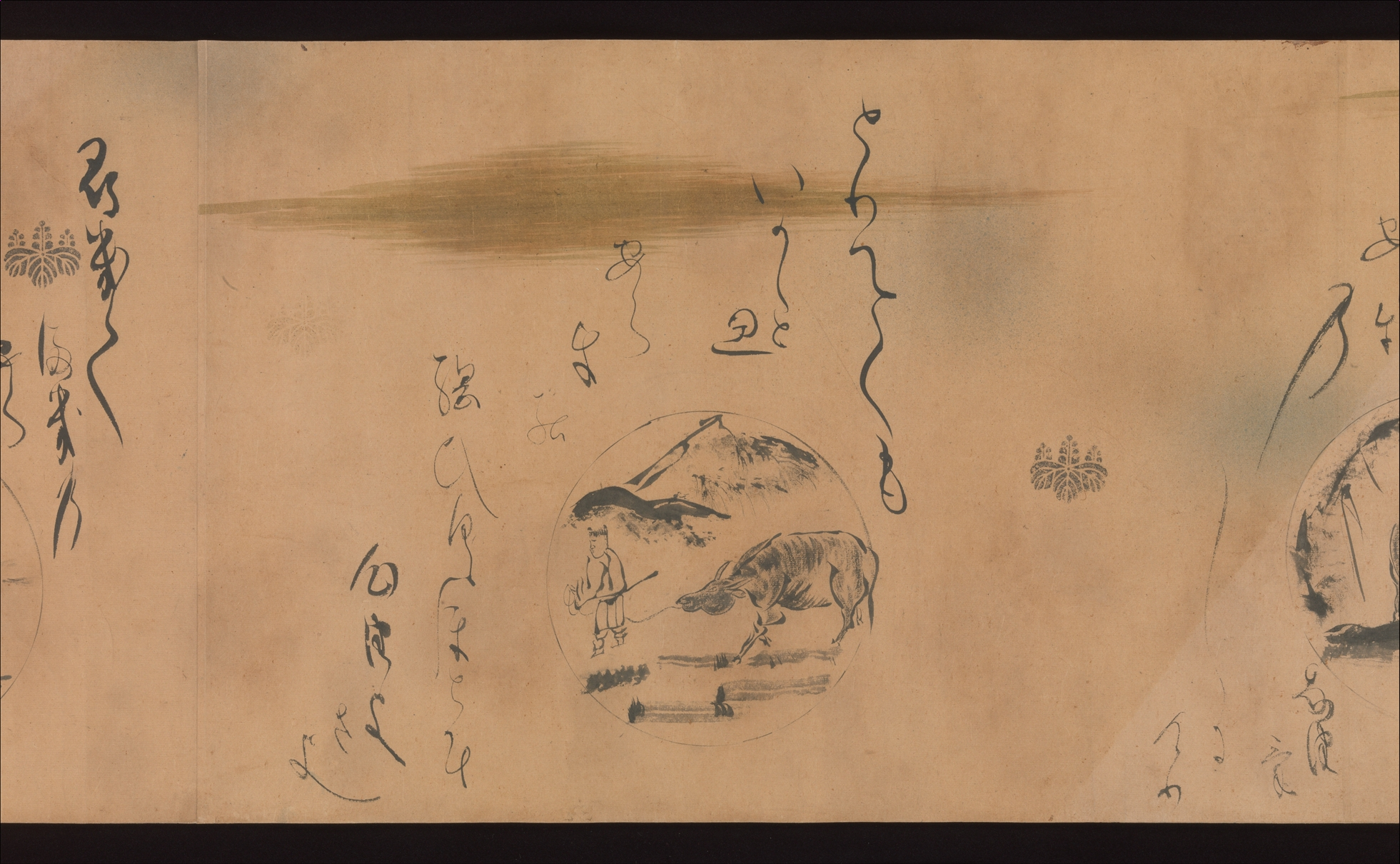

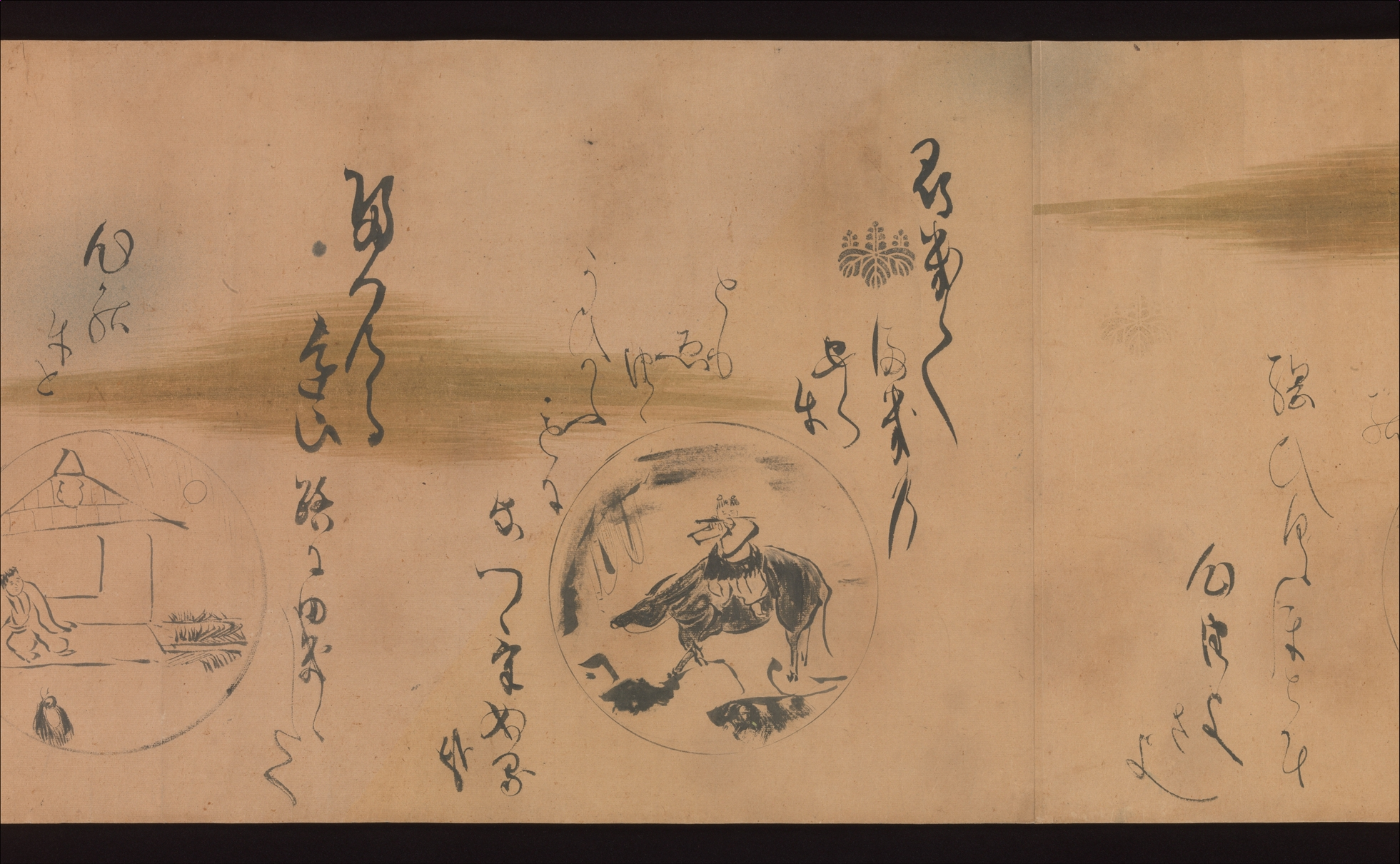

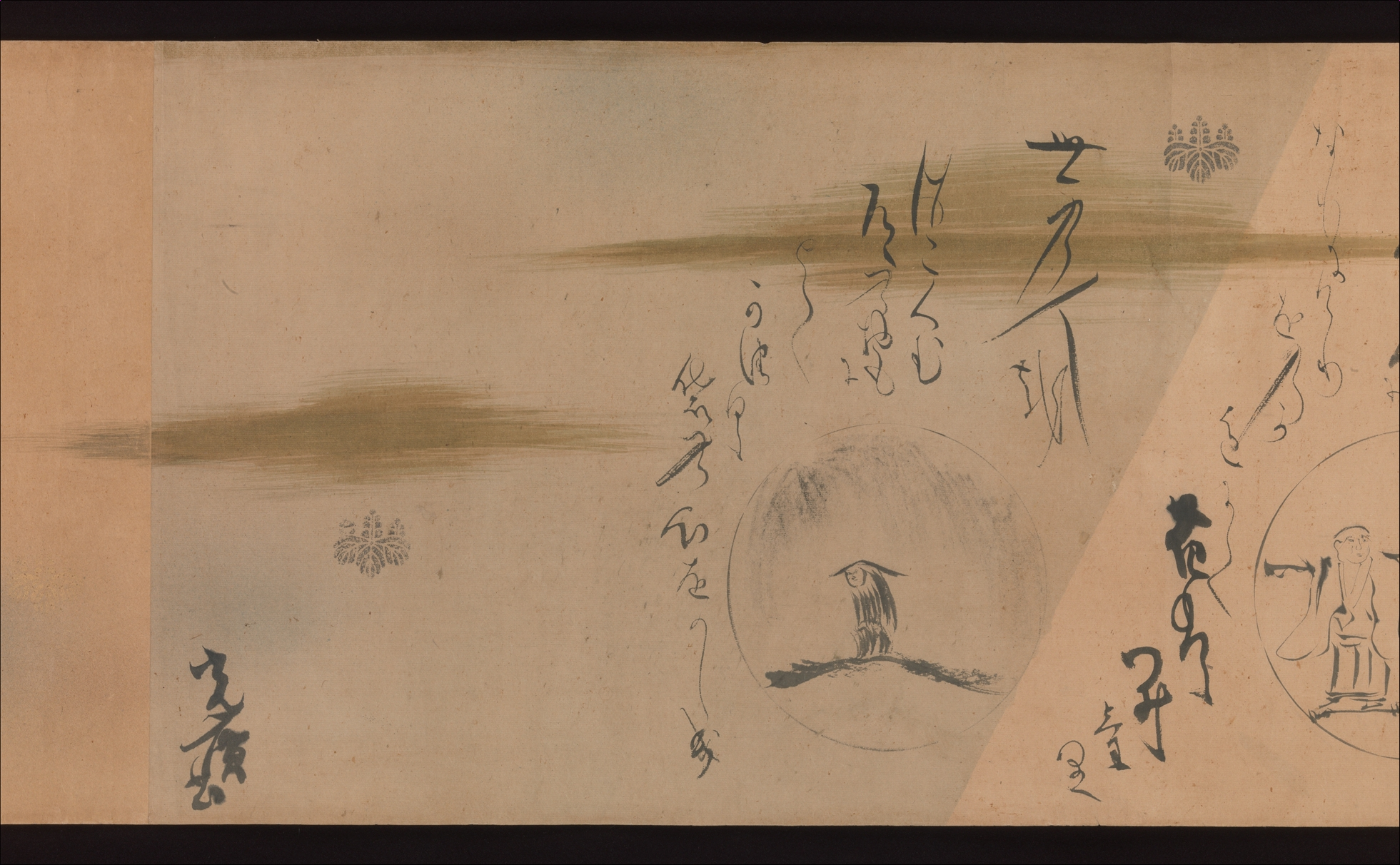

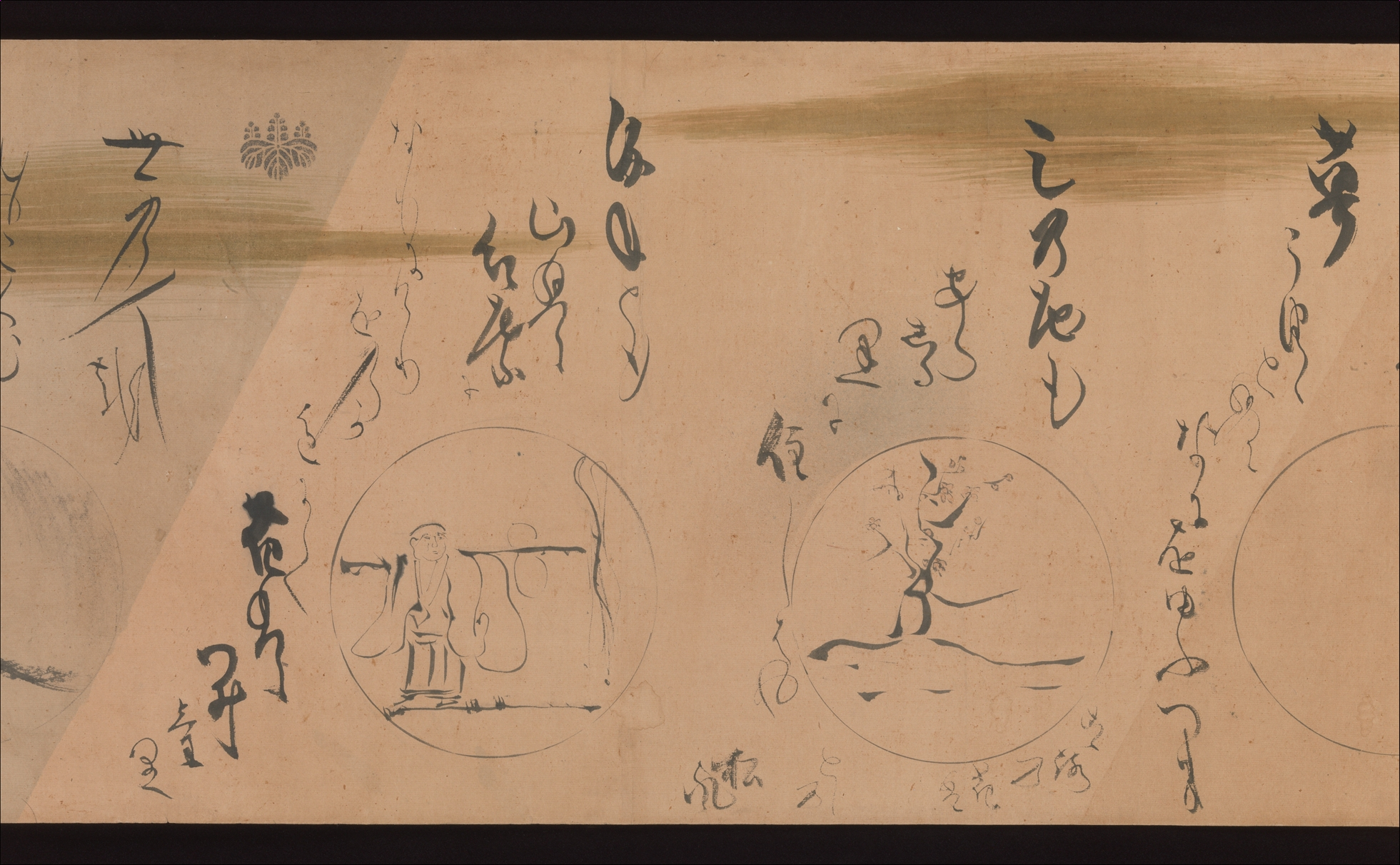

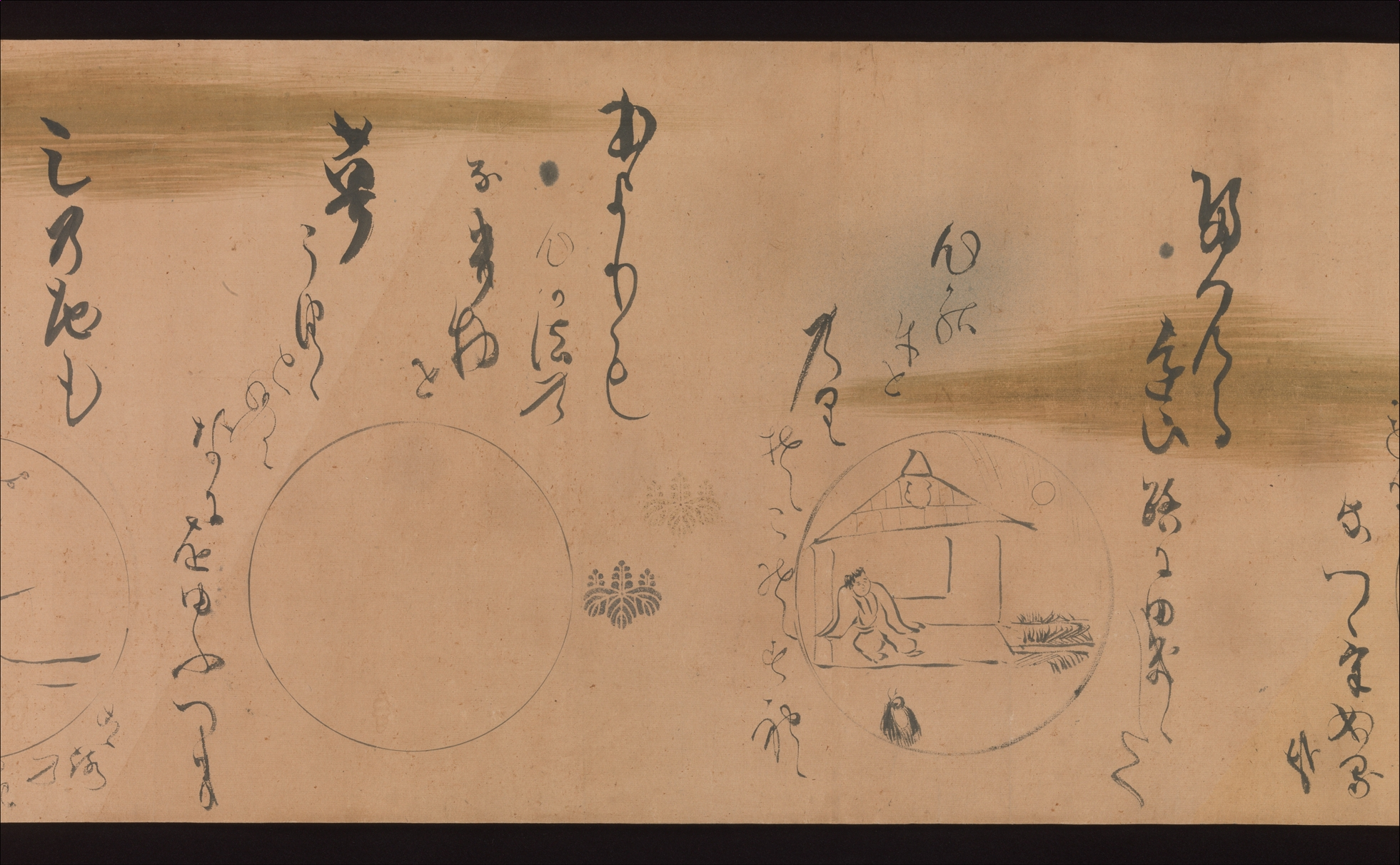

== Parallels in the Indo-Tibetan tradition ==
A similar series of meditative stages is depicted in the Nine Stages of Tranquility, used in the Mahamudra tradition, in which the mind is represented by an elephant and a monkey. This is based on the teachings of Asaṅga (4th CE), who delineating the nine mental abidings in his Abhidharmasamuccaya and the Śrāvakabhūmi chapter of his Yogācārabhūmi-śāstra It is also found in the Mahāyānasūtrālaṅkāra of Maitreyanātha, which shows considerable similarity in arrangement and content to the Bodhisattva-bhūmi-śāstra. (Note: Piya Tan gives a full description of these stages; see Piya Tan (2004), The Taming of the Bull. Mind-training and the formation of Buddhist traditions, dharmafarer.org)

In this scheme, śamatha practice is said to progress through nine "mental abidings" or Nine stages of training the mind (S. navākārā cittasthiti, Tib. sems gnas dgu), leading to śamatha proper (the equivalent of "access concentration" in the Theravāda system), and from there to a state of meditative concentration called the first dhyāna (Pāli: jhāna; Tib. bsam gtan) which is often said to be a state of tranquillity or bliss. However, this Indo-Tibetan series of stages is not equivalent to the ten bulls, since it is strictly a description of samatha practice, while the ten bulls depict the stages of awakening to the nature of mind (and as such, is not strictly about samatha only, but about the entire path of awakening).

== Influence and cultural legacy ==
Ten Bulls (by Tokuriki Tomikichiro, 1902–99).

The ox-herding pictures had an immediate and extensive influence on the Chinese practice of Chan. According to Chi Kwang Sunim, they may represent a Chan/Zen interpretation of the ten Bodhisattva bhumi, the ten stages on the Bodhisattva-path.

The pictures first became widely known in the West after their inclusion in the 1957 book, Zen Flesh, Zen Bones: A Collection of Zen and Pre-Zen Writings, by Paul Reps and Nyogen Senzaki. Alan Watts included a description of the Ten Bulls in The Spirit of Zen. The pictures went on to influence the work of John Cage, particularly in his emphasis on rhythmic silence, and on images of nothingness. The pictures, especially the last one ('In the Marketplace'), have provided a conceptual umbrella for those Buddhists seeking a greater engagement with the post-industrial global marketplace.

Cat Stevens' sixth studio album Catch Bull at Four is a reference to the 4th step towards enlightenment. On the album, the song Sitting refers to meditation, and the apprehensions that may result from the experiences resulting from enlightenment. Catch Bull at Four was commercially successful and spent 3 weeks at number one in the Billboard album charts in 1972.

Leonard Cohen based his song 'Ballad of the Absent Mare', which appeared in his album Recent Songs published in 1979, on the Ten Bulls stories. In the liner notes to the album, Cohen thanks his Zen master Kyozan Joshu Sasaki for inspiring one of the songs: "I owe my thanks to Joshu Sasaki upon whose exposition of an early Chinese text I based 'Ballad of the Absent Mare.'"

In the 1989 South Korean film Why Has Bodhi-Dharma Left for the East?, an ox escapes into the forest and one of the protagonists, a young boy, attempts to hunt it down through the bushes. During the opening scene of Apichatpong Weerasethakul's 2010 film Uncle Boonmee Who Can Recall His Past Lives, a water buffalo stands tied to a tree before breaking loose and wandering into a forest.

== See also ==
- Nine Stages of Tranquility (depiction with elephants)
- Buddhist paths to liberation
- Bodhi
- Five Ranks
- Monomyth
- Nirvana

== Sources ==
=== Printed sources ===
- Goodman, R. A. (1999), Modern Organizations and Emerging Conundrums, Lexington Books
- Jinwol (2009), Seon Experience for Ecological Awakening. In: Religion, Ecology & Gender, pp.131-146, LIT Verlag Münster
- Pritchett, J. (1996), The Music of John Cage, Cambridge University Press
