= Song of the Precious Mirror Samadhi =

The Song of the Precious Mirror Samadhi (Chinese: 寶鏡三昧歌; pinyin: Bǎojìng sānmèi gē; Wade–Giles: Pao-ching San-mei-ke; Japanese: Hōkyō Zammai; also translated as Song of the Jeweled Mirror Samadhi and Sacred Mirror Samadhi) is a Chan/Zen poem in Classical Chinese that appeared during the Song dynasty (960–1279). The work is often attributed to Dongshan Liangjie (Japanese: Tōzan Ryōkai), the co-founder of the Caodong/Sōtō branch of Chan/Zen Buddhism.

== Dating and attribution ==
The poem is first mentioned in Juefan Huihong's biographical compilation of 1119, the Chanlin sengbao zhuan (Chronicle of the Sangha Treasure in the Groves of Chan), written over 200 years after Dongshan Liangjie's death. Huihong, however, does not attribute the poem to Dongshan. He writes instead that the poem was given to Dongshan by his teacher, Yunyan Tansheng. Huihong further speculates that Yunyan's teacher, Yaoshan Weiyan, probably entrusted it to him in turn. Huihong relates that he came upon the poem in 1108, when it was given to a scholar Zhu Yan by a monk, whom he does not identify.

The scholar Morten Schlütter notes that the poem's provenance is doubtful given the way it came to Huihong, and furthermore the style differs substantially from works of the era that Huihong attributes it to. Most later historical sources, such as the Zengaku daijiten, the Bussho kaisetsu daijiten, and Shinsan zenseki mokuroku, attribute the poem to Dongshan Liangjie rather than Yunyan, although again, neither is likely to be the true author.

According to Schlütter "the text is very different in style and character from the early Caodong records, and it clearly cannot be taken as evidence for the presence of a silent illumination approach in the early Caodong tradition. the inclusion of the “Baojing sanmei” in the Sengbao zhuan together with Huihong's attached remarks, however, does indicate that the “Baojing sanmei” circulated as a work of the early Caodong tradition by the beginning of the twelfth century."

== See also ==
- Five Ranks
- Cantongqi
