= Dongshan Liangjie =

Chinese writer and monk (807–869)

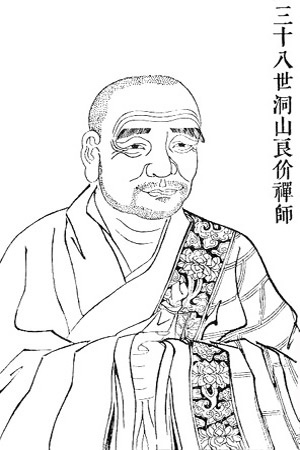
- Title: Chan master (禅師)

Personal life
- Born: 807 China
- Died: 869
- Notable work(s): Song of the Precious Mirror Samadhi (《寶鏡三昧歌》) (attrib.); Recorded dialogues (《洞山語録》)

Religious life
- Religion: Chan Buddhism
- School: Caodong school (曹洞宗, J. Sōtō)

Senior posting
- Teacher: Yunyan Tansheng
- Predecessor: Yunyan Tansheng
- Successor: Yunju Daoying / Caoshan Benji (the latter's branch discontinued)
- Students: (other than successors) Longya Judun Jiufeng Puman Qinshan Wensui Yuezhou Qianfeng Qinglin Shiqian Shushan Kuangren

Dongshan Liangjie (807–869) (Chinese: 洞山良价; pinyin: Dòngshān Liángjiè; Wade–Giles: Tung-shan Liang-chieh; Japanese: Tōzan Ryōkai; Korean: Tongsan Lianggye; Vietnamese: Động Sơn Lương Giới) was a Chan/Zen Buddhist monk of the Tang dynasty. He founded the Caodong school (Chinese: 曹洞宗), which was transmitted to Japan in the thirteenth century (Song-Yuan era) by Dōgen and developed into the Sōtō school of Zen.

The Song of the Precious Mirror Samadhi has been attributed to him by the Chinese tradition. However, modern scholars now argue that there is no evidence for this and that this text first appears in the 12th century.

== Biography ==
=== Start of Chan studies ===
Dongshan was born during the Tang dynasty in Kuaiji (present-day Shaoxing, Zhejiang) to the south of Hangzhou Bay. His secular birth surname was Yu (兪氏).

He started his private studies in Chan Buddhism at a young age, as was popular among educated elite families of the time. At the village cloister, Dongshan showed promise by questioning the fundamental Doctrine of the Six Roots during his tutor's recitation of the Heart Sutra. Though aged only ten, he was sent away from his home village to train under Lingmo (霊黙) at the monastery on nearby Mount Wutai (五台山). He also had his head shaved and took on yellow robes, which represented the first steps in his path to becoming a monk, ordaining as a śrāmaṇera. At the age of twenty-one, he went to Shaolin Monastery on Mount Song, where he took the complete monk's precepts as a bhikṣu.

=== Wandering life ===
Dongshan Liangjie spent a large portion of his early life wandering between Chan masters and hermits in the Hongzhou (Chinese: 洪州; Wade–Giles: Hung-chou) region.

According to the traditional sources, he obtained instruction from Nanquan Puyuan (南泉普願), and later from Guishan Lingyou (溈山靈祐). But the teacher of preeminent influence was Master Yunyan Tansheng, of whom Dongshan became the dharma heir. According to the work Rentian yanmu (《人天眼目》, "The Eye of Humans and Gods," 1188), Dongshan inherited from Yunyan Tansheng the knowledge of the Three Types of Leakage (三種滲漏, shenlou) and the baojing sanmei (宝鏡三昧 "jewel mirror samādhi or precious mirror samādhi"; Japanese: hōkyō zanmai).

Most of what is recorded regarding his journey and studies exists in the form of encounter dialogues between him and his various teachers. These provide very little insight into his personality or experiences beyond his daily rituals, style of spiritual education, and a few specific events.

During the later years of his pilgrimage Emperor Wuzong's Great Anti-Buddhist Persecution (843–845) reached its height, but it had little effect on Dongshan or his newfound followers. A little over a decade later, in 859, Dongshan felt he had completed his role as an assistant instructor at Hsin-feng Mountain, so with the blessing of his last masters, he took some students and left to establish his own school.

=== Establishing the Caodong school of Chan ===
At the age of fifty-two, Dongshan established a mountain school at the mountain named Dongshan (in what is now the city of Gao'an in Jiangxi province). The cloister temple he founded bore such names as Guanfu (広福寺), Gongde (功德寺), Chongxian Longbao (崇先隆報寺) but was named Puli Yuan (普利院) in the early Song dynasty period. Here, according to tradition, he composed the Song of the Precious Mirror Samādhi. Modern scholars now see no evidence for this, and this text is now seen as being a later 12th century Caodong composition.

His disciples here are said to have numbered between five hundred and one thousand.

This Caodong school became regarded as one of the Five Houses of Zen. At the time, they were just considered schools led by individualistic masters with distinct styles and personalities; in reality, the fact that they were all—with the exception of Linji—located in close geographic proximity to each other and that they all were at the height of their teaching around the same time, established a custom among students to routinely visit the other masters.

=== Death ===
Dongshan died at the age of sixty-three, in the tenth year of the Xiantong era (869), having spent forty-two years as a monk. His shrine, built in keeping with Buddhist tradition, was named the Stūpa of Wisdom-awareness, and his posthumous name was Chan Master Wu-Pen. According to one of the kōans of his sect, Dongshan announced the end of his life several days before the event, and used the opportunity to teach his students one final time. In response to their grief over the news of his impending death, he told them to create a "delusion banquet." After a week of preparations, he took one bite of the meal and, telling the students not to "make a great commotion over nothing," went to his room and died.

== Teaching ==
Although Linji and Liangjie shared pupils, Liangjie had a particular style. Since his early life he had utilized gātha, or small poems, in order to try better to understand and to expound the meaning of Chan principles for himself and others.

Examples are

Avoid seeking elsewhere, for that's far from the self.
Now I travel alone, everywhere I meet it.
Now it's exactly me, now I'm not it.
It must thus be understood to merge with thusness.

and

Students as numerous as sands in the Ganges but none are awakened.
They err by searching for the path in another person's mouth.
If you wish to forget form and not leave any traces,
Wholeheartedly strive to walk in emptiness.

Further features of the school included particular interpretations of kōan, an emphasis on "silent illumination" Chan, and organization of students into the "three root types." He is still well known for his creation of the Five Ranks.

=== Use of kōan and silent illumination ===
Some descendants of Dongshan much later in the Song dynasty, around the twelfth century, argued that the gong'an, which developed over centuries based on dialogues attributed to Dongshan and his contemporaries, should not have a specific goal, because that would naturally "[imply] a dualist distinction between ignorance and enlightenment." This view is based on Dongshan's perspective of not basing practice on stages of attainment. Instead, such Dongshan lineage descendants as Hongzhi encouraged the use of Silent Illumination Chan (默照禪 mozhao chan) as a way to take a self-fulfilling, rather than a competitive, path to enlightenment. These two differences contrasted especially with the style of Linji's descendants; "silent illumination Chan" was originally one of many pejorative terms created by successors of Linji regarding successors of Dongshan.

=== Three categories of students ===
Dongshan was distinguished by his ability to instruct all three categories of students, which he defined as

- "Those who see but do not yet comprehend the Dharma"
- "Those in the process of understanding"
- "Those who have already understood"

=== Five Ranks ===
A large portion of Master Dongshan's fame came from his having attributed to him the Verses of the Five Ranks. The Five Ranks were a doctrine which mapped out five stages of comprehension of the relationship between the absolute and relative realities. The Five Ranks are:

- The Absolute within the Relative (Cheng chung p'ien)
- The Relative within the Absolute (P'ien chung cheng)
- The Coming from Within the Absolute (Cheng chung lai)
- The Contrasted Relative Alone (Pien chung chih)
- Unity Attained (Chien chung tao), when the two previously opposite states become one

For each of these ranks, Dongshan wrote a verse trying to bring such abstract ideals into the realm of real experience. He used metaphors of day-to-day occurrences that his students could understand. His student Ts'ao-shan Pen-chi later went on to relate the Five Ranks to the classic Chinese text, the I Ching.

== Lineage ==
Dongshan's most renowned students were Caoshan Benji (W-G: T'sao-shan, 840–901) and Yunju Daoying (W-G: Yun-chu Taoying, 835–902).

Caoshan refined and finalized on Dongshan's works on Buddhist doctrine. The sect's name, Caodong, may possibly take after the names of these two teachers. (An alternate theory says the "Cao" refers to Caoxi Huineng [曹渓慧能 W-G: Ts'ao-hsi Hui-neng], the sixth ancestor of Chan; see Sōtō#Chinese origins.)

The lineage that Caoshan began did not last beyond his immediate disciples. Yunju Daoying started a branch of Dongshan's lineage which lasted in China until the seventeenth century. Thirteen generations later, the Japanese Buddhist monk Dōgen Kigen (1200–1253) was educated in the traditions of Dongshan's Caodong school of Chan. Following his education, he returned to his homeland and started the Sōtō school ("Sōtō" is the Japanese reading of "Caodong").

Six Patriarchs

Huineng (638-713)
(WG: Hui-neng. Jpn: Enō)

Qingyuan Xingsi (660-740)
(WG: Tch'ing yüan Hsing-ssu. Jpn: Seigen Gyōshi)

Shitou Xiqian (700-790)
(WG: Shih-t'ou Hsi-ch'ien. Jpn: Sekitō Kisen)

Yaoshan Weiyan (ca.745-828)
(Yao-shan Wei-yen, Jpn. Yakusan Igen)

Yunyan Tansheng (780-841)
(Yün-yen T'an-shen, Jpn. Ungan Donjō)
Linji lineage
Linji school
0
Dongshan Liangjie (807-869)
Tung-shan liang-chieh, Jpn. Tōzan Ryōkai)
Linji Yixuan
1
Caoshan Benji (840-901)
(Ts'ao-shan Pen-chi, Jpn. Sōzan Honjaku)
Yunju Daoying (d.902)
(Yün-chü Tao-ying, Jpn. Ungo Dōyō)
Xinghua Cunjiang
2

Tongan Daopi (Daopi)
Nanyuan Huiyong
3

Tongan Guanzhi (Tongan)
Fengxue Yanzhao
4

Liangshan Yuanguan
Shoushan Xingnian
5

Dayang Jingxuan (942-1027) (Dayang)
Shexian Guixing

Fushan Fayuan (Rinzai-master))
6

Touzi Yiqing (1032-1083) (Touzi)

7

Furong Daokai (1043-1118) (Daokai)

8

Lumen Zijue (d.1117)
Danxia Zichun (1064-1117) (Danxia)

9

Puzhao Yibian (1081-1149)
Hongzhi Zhengjue (1091-1157)

Zhenxie Qingliao (Wukong)

10

Lingyan Sengbao (1114-1171)
Tiantong Zongjue (Zongjue)

11

Yushan Shiti
Xuedou Zhijian (Zhijian)

12

Xueyan Huiman (d.1206)
Tiantong Rujing (Rujing)

13

Wansong Xingxiu (1166-1246)
Dōgen

14

Xueting Fuyu (1203-1275)
Soto-lineage

Soto school

15

Lingyin Wentai (d.1289)

16

Huanyuan Fuyu (1245-1313)

17

Chunzuo Wencai (1273-1352)

18

Songting Ziyan

19

Ningran Liaogai (1335-1421)

20

Jukong Qibin (1383-1452)

21

Wufang Kecong (1420-1483)

22

Yuezhou Wenzai (1452-1524)

23

Zongjing Zongshu (1500-1567)

24

Huanxiu Changrun (d.1585)

25

Cizhou Fangnian (d.1594)

26

Yunmen Yuancheng (1561-1626)

27

Ruibai Mingxue (1584-1641)

28

Poan Jingdeng (1603-1659)

29

Guqiao Zhixian

30

Jiantang Dejing (1614-1691)

31

Shuoan Xingzai

32

Minxiu Fuyi (d.1790)

33

Biyan Xiangjie (1703-1765)

34

Jizhou Chengyao (d.1737)

35

Juchau Qingheng

36

Xingyuan Juequan

37

Moxi Haiyin

38

Yuehui Liaochan

39

Liuchang Wuchun

40

Jiehang Daxu

41

Yunfan Changzhao

42

Fenping Zhaoci

43

Dejun Zijue

44

Jitang Jiatai

45

Zhiguang Wenjue (1889-1963)

46

Dongchu Denglang (1861-1939)

47

Huikong Shengyan (1930-2009)

49

Chi Chern (b. 1955)
Zhengzhan Guoru (1951-2024)
Huimin (b.1954)
Guo Huei (b.1958)
Guo Dong (b.1955)
Guo Pin
Guojing
Guo Goang
Guo Zhao
Guo Yi (b. 1980)
Zhengli Guoyuan (b.1948)
Zhengyan Guojun (b.1969)
Zhengjue Guoxing (b.1961)
John Crook (1930-2011)
Simon Child (b.1956)
Max Kälin (1943-)
Žarko Andričević (1955-)
Gilbert Gutierrez (1951-)

== Modern scholarship ==
Very little documentation remains about Dongshan's life. Information is usually limited to dates, names, and general locations.

The only primary sources available are two collections of doctrine and lineage, T'su-t'ang-chi (Records from the Halls of the Patriarchs) and Ching-tê chʻuan teng lu (Transmission of the Lamp). Both only indicate the name as having been generated from Tun-shan's connections to "T'sao," and they are equally ambiguous on most other facts.

== Sources ==
- Bodiford, William M. (Winter 1991). "Dharma Transmission in Soto Zen: Manzan Dohaku's Reform Movement". Monumenta Nipponica. 46 (4). Sophia University: 423–451. doi:10.2307/2385187. ISSN 0027-0741. JSTOR 2385187.
- Cleary, Thomas (1990), Transmission of Light, Zen in the Art of Enlightenment by Zen Master Keizan. Translated and introduction by Thomas Cleary, San Francisco: North Point Press, ISBN 0-86547-433-8
- Demiéville, Paul. Choix d'études sinologiques. Leiden, Netherlands: E. J. Brill, 1970.
- Ferguson, Andrew E. (2009). Zen's Chinese heritage : the masters and their teachings (Illustrated ed.). Boston: Wisdom Publications. ISBN 978-0-86171-163-5.
- Ferguson, Andy (2011), Zen's Chinese Heritage. The Masters and their Teachings, Wisdom publications
- Dumoulin, Heinrich. Zen Buddhism: A History. Trans. James W. Heisig and Paul F. Knitter. Vol. 2. New York: Macmillan, 1988.
- Keown, Damien. A Dictionary of Buddhism. Oxford: Oxford UP, 2003.
- Ku, Y. H. History of Zen. Privately published by Y. H. Ku, Emeritus Professor, University of Pennsylvania, 1979.
- Lai, Whalen, and Lewis R. Lancaster, eds. Early Ch'an in China and Tibet. Berkeley, California: Asian Humanities Press, 1983.
- Leighton, Taigen Dan. Just This Is It: Dongshan and the Practice of Suchness. Boston & London: Shambhala, 2015. ISBN 978-1-61180-228-3
- (Liang-chieh.) The Record of Tung-shan. Trans. William F. Powell. Kuroda Institute Classics in East Asian Buddhism. Honolulu: University of Hawai‘i Press, 1986. ISBN 0-8248-1070-8
- Schlütter, Morten (2008), How Zen became Zen. The Dispute over Enlightenment and the Formation of Chan Buddhism in Song-Dynasty China, Honolulu: University of Hawai'i Press, ISBN 978-0-8248-3508-8

Buddhist titles
Preceded by Yunyan Tansheng	Caodong Chan/Sōtō Zen patriarch	Succeeded by Yunju Daoying
