= Tongan Daopi =

Tongan Daopi 同安道丕
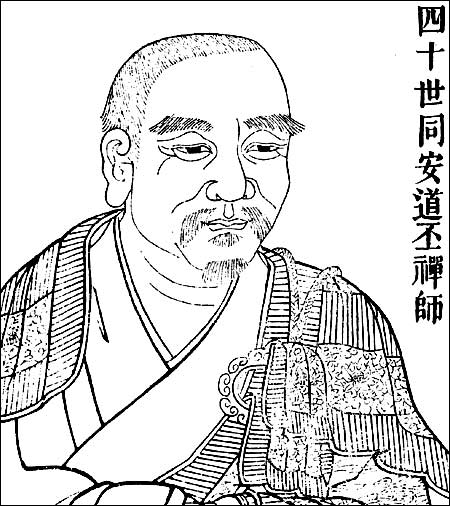
- Title: Chán master

Personal life
- Born: China

Religious life
- Religion: Buddhism
- School: Chán

Senior posting
- Teacher: Yunju Daoying
- Predecessor: Yunju Daoying
- Successor: Tongan Guanzhi (?)
- Students: Tongan Guanzhi (?)

Tongan Daopi (Chinese: 同安道丕; Japanese: Doan Dōhi) was a Chan/Zen Buddhist monk during the end of the Tang dynasty and the beginning of the Five Dynasties and Ten Kingdoms period. Very little is known about him. Traditional biographies record that he was the abbot of Tongan Monastery on Mount Fengchi near modern Nanchang. The earliest source of information on monks of this era is the Zutang ji (Patriarch's Hall Record), which was completed in 952, but it fails to mention Tongan Daopi as a disciple of his supposed teacher Yunju Daoying. The Zutang ji does, however, record someone with the name Tongan asking a question to Yunju Daoying. The scholar Ui Hakuju has written this could likely refer to Tongan Daopi. He is first explicitly mentioned in the Transmission of the Lamp, which was compiled around 1004. However, in that work, it does not mention Tongan Daopi as having any disciples. The commonly accepted version of his lineage holds that Tongan Guanzhi is Tongan Daopi's successor. However, this comes from Huihong's Sengbao zhuan, which was completed in 1119, much longer after Tongan's death than the other works. The Transmission of the Lamp instead claims that Tongan Guanzhi is the disciple of a Tongan Wei, in turn a student of Jufeng Puman, with Jufeng being an apparently obscure student of the famous Dongshan Liangjie. Both Tongan Wei and Jufeng Puman are listed for the first time in the Transmission of the Lamp, and neither with much information. However, Dayang Jingxuan, who in Huihong's version of the lineage is a descendant of Tonagan Daopi, is recorded in the Transmission of the Lamp as being descended through Jufeng Puman and Tongan Wei. Dayang was close with Wang Shu, one of the compilers of Transmission of the Lamp, suggesting that it is unlikely that an error would have been made therein about his lineage. This suggests that Tongan Guanzhi is much more likely to have been a student of Tongan Wei and not Tongan Daopi as commonly accepted.

Buddhist titles
Preceded by Yunju Daoying	Caodong Chan/Sōtō Zen patriarch	Succeeded by Tongan Guanzhi
