= Cantongqi (Buddhism) =

The Cantongqi (Chinese: 參同契; pinyin: Cāntóngqì), or Sandōkai, is a poem by the eighth Chinese Zen ancestor Shitou Xiqian (Sekito Kisen, 700–790) and a fundamental text of the Caodong (Sōtō) school of Chan (Zen), chanted daily in temples throughout the world.

== Title ==
The poem's title, "參同契", is pronounced Cāntóngqì in Mandarin Chinese or Sandōkai in Japanese. The characters, in particular the first, 參 (cān or san), can have several quite different meanings, and therefore the poem's title is susceptible to a variety of interpretations and translations.

English translations of the title, some more and some less literal, include "Merging of Difference and Unity", "Merging of Difference and Equality", "Agreement of Difference and Unity", "Harmony of Difference and Sameness", "Harmonious Song of Difference and Sameness", "Identity of Relative and Absolute", "Harmony of Relative and Absolute", "Harmony of Difference and Equality", and "Ode on Identity".

The title of the Cantongqi is the same as that of a 2nd-century Taoist text on alchemy, which is also known as the Cantong qi; in reference to the Taoist work, "參同契" is often translated as "the Kinship of the Three".

== Text ==
Identity of Relative and Absolute

The mind of the Great Sage of India was intimately

conveyed from west to east.

Among human beings are wise ones and fools,

But in the Way there is no northern or southern Patriarch.

The subtle source is clear and bright; the tributary

streams flow through the darkness.

To be attached to things is illusion;

To encounter the absolute is not yet enlightenment.

Each and all, the subjective and objective spheres are related,

and at the same time, independent.

Related, yet working differently, though each keeps its own place.

Form makes the character and appearance different;

Sounds distinguish comfort and discomfort.

The dark makes all words one; the brightness distinguishes good and bad phrases.

The four elements return to their nature as a child to its mother.

Fire is hot, wind moves, water is wet, earth hard.

Eyes see, ears hear, nose smells, tongue tastes the salt and sour.

Each is independent of the other; cause and effect must return to the great reality

Like leaves that come from the same root.

The words high and low are used relatively.

Within light there is darkness, do not be against the darkness. (nothingness/absolute);

Within darkness there is light, do not be against the light. (material/relative).

Light and darkness are a pair, like the foot before

and the foot behind, in walking. Each thing has its own intrinsic value

and is related to everything else in function and position.

Things exist as real as how the lid and box fits.

Truth corresponds like the sharp arrow piercing (through things).

Reading words you should grasp where it’s coming from. Do not come up with your own rules.

If you can not comprehend the way, on a far journey how would you know the road.

Progress is not about far or near, delusion can block (you) as firmly as the mountains and rivers.

I respectfully say to those who wish to be enlightened:

Do not waste your time by night or day.

Another translation by Rev. Master Jiyu-Kennett:

Sandokai

From west to east, unseen, flowed out the mind of India's greatest Sage

And to the source kept true as an unsullied stream is clear.

Although by wit and dullness the True Way is varied,

Yet it has no Patriarch of south or north.

Here born we clutch at things

And then compound delusion, later on, by following ideals;

Each sense gate and its object all together enter thus in mutual relations

And yet stand apart in a uniqueness of their own, depending and yet non-depending both.

In form and feel component things are seen to differ deeply;

Thus are voices, in inherent isolation, soft or harsh.

Such words as high and middle darkness match;

Light separates the murky from the pure.

The properties of the four elements together draw

Just as a child returns unto its mother.

Lo! The heat of fire, the moving wind, the water wet, the earth all solid.

Eyes to see, sounds heard and smells; upon the tongue the sour, salty taste.

And yet, in each related thing, as leaves grow from the roots,

End and beginning here return unto the source and "high" and "low" are used respectively.

Within all light is darkness

But explained it cannot be by darkness that one-sided is alone.

In darkness there is light

But, here again, by light one-sided it is not explained.

Light goes with darkness

As the sequence does of steps in walking;

All things have inherent, great potentiality,

Both function, rest, reside within.

Lo! With the ideal comes the actual,

Like a box all with its lid.

Lo! With the ideal comes the actual,

Like two arrows in mid-air that meet.

Completely understand herein

The basic Truth within these words;

Lo! Hear! Set up not your own standards.

If, from your experience of the senses, basic Truth you do not know,

How can you ever find the path that certain is, no matter how far distant you may walk?

As you walk on distinctions between near and far are lost

And, should you lost become, there will arise obstructing mountains and great rivers.

This I offer to the seeker of great Truth,

Do not waste time.

== Text commentary ==
Toward the end of his life Shunryu Suzuki Roshi gave a series of lectures on the Cantongqi. These have been published as the book Branching Streams Flow in the Darkness.

Sheng-yen published a commentary in English on both the Cantongqi ("Inquiry Into Matching Halves") and "The Precious Mirror of Samadhi" under the title The Infinite Mirror ((1990), Dharma Drum Publications ISBN 0-9609854-4-1).

== See also ==
- Five Ranks
- Song of the Precious Mirror Samadhi
