= Xianzi (monk) =

Semi-historical Buddhist monk

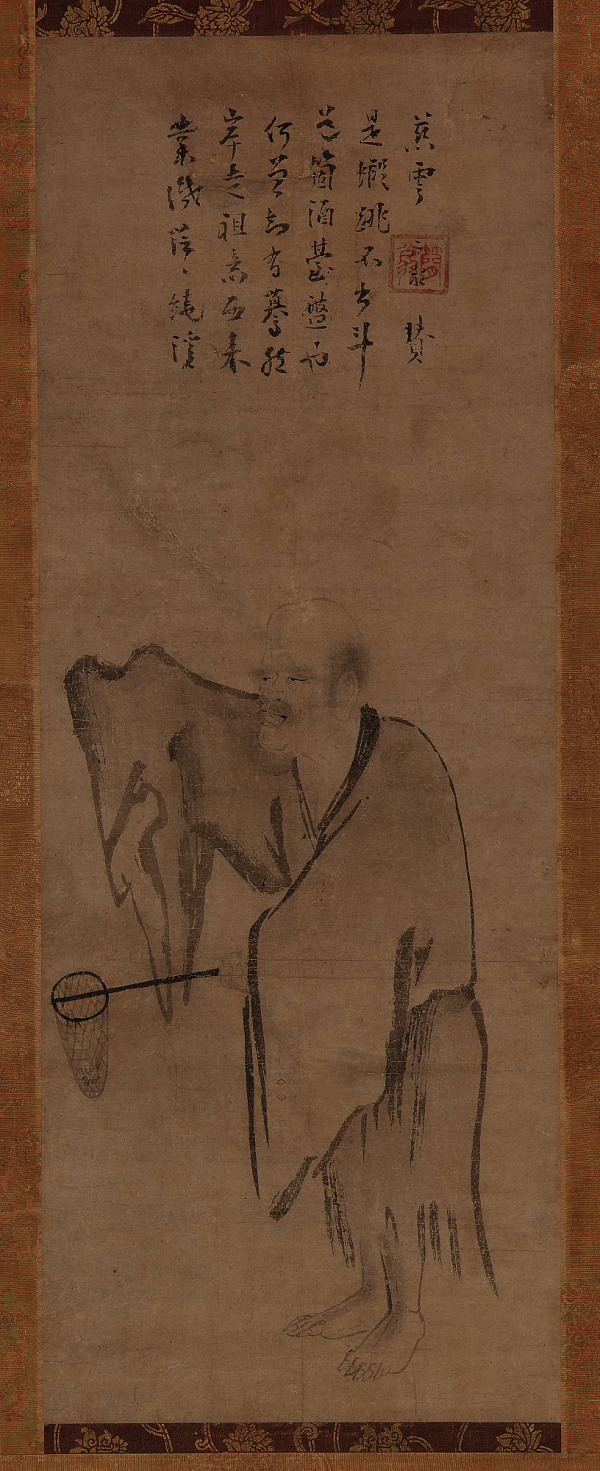
Master Clam catching a Shrimp. Southern Song dynasty, mid-13th century. Property of the Freer Sackler Gallery.

Xianzi (Chinese: 蜆子), or Kensu in Japanese, also known as the Shrimp Eater, was a semi-historical Chan/Zen monk, considered to be one of the “scattered sages,” who were deviant or otherwise unusual figures within the Chan tradition. Infamous for his iconoclastic breaking of the taboo on eating meat set forth in the Vinaya Code of monastic rules, the Shrimp Eater appears in several traditional Zen paintings as both a comedic figure that underscores the Zen tradition of humor, as well as an eccentric, enlightened individual.

== Sources ==
Most information on Xianzi comes from the Transmission of the Lamp, a collection of hagiographies (1004-1007 C.E.) intended to highlight the “anti-textualism and iconoclasm of the Chan monks”. Included within this collection of hagiographies are many nontraditional Chan Buddhist figures, such as Xianzi, who never became patriarchs or abbots on their own, but whose stories were still considered vital for the transmission of Chan teachings. Additional information on Xianzi comes from the poems and inscriptions that monks wrote on paintings of him. One such inscription on a painting of Xianzi by the Japanese painter Yogetsu reads:

Zen believers say the origin [of all things] is emptiness

An enlightened one like you – is there another?
Cold or hot, just one plain robe is enough.

Every day, carrying nets you accompany fishermen

— Unknown

Xianzi, the Shrimp Eater.

Since there is very little hard information on Xianzi other than what is written in the Transmission of the Lamp, inscriptions such as these are important in understanding the context in which he was discussed, the role that he played in Zen teaching, as well as in filling in some of the basic details of his life story.

== Biography ==
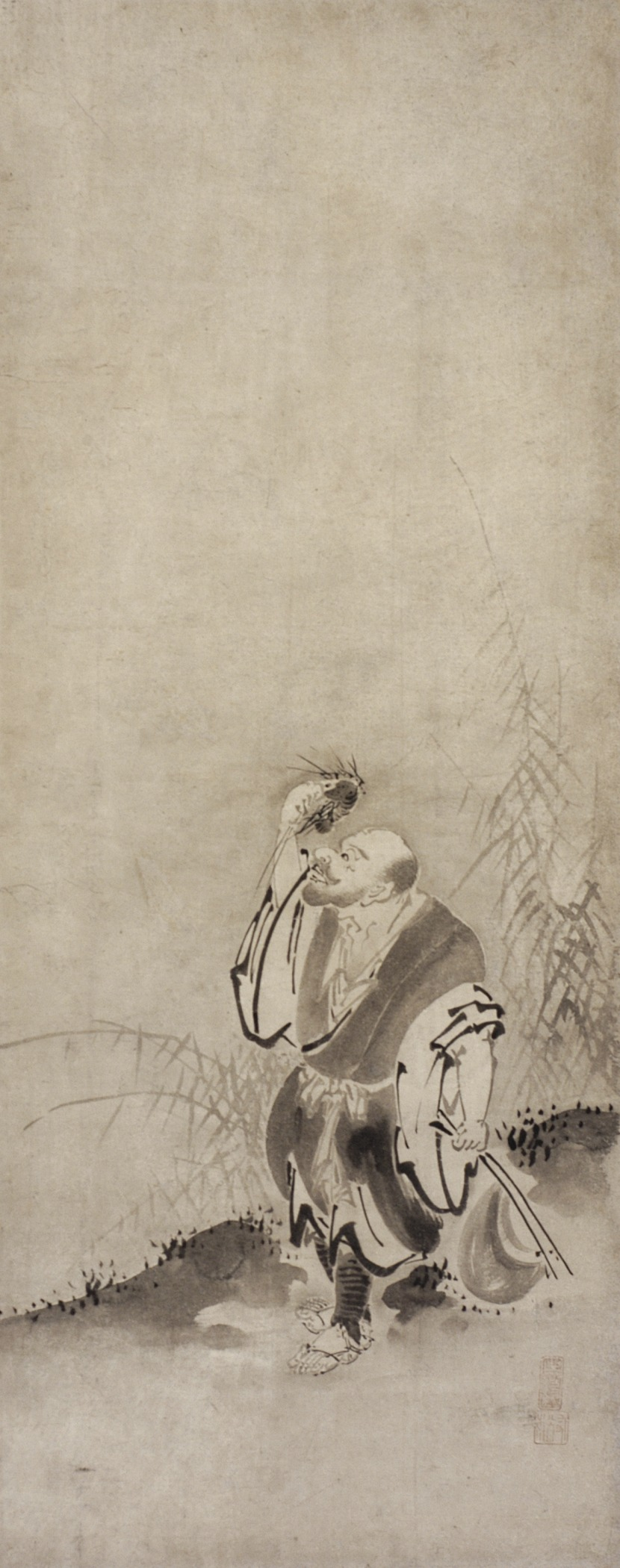
Buddhist Patriarch Kensu with Shrimp. Late 17th century Japan.

It is recorded in the Jing-de Era Record that Xianzi lived in China during the Tang dynasty (618–907) and was a pupil to Dongshan Liangjie 洞山良價, the founder of the Caodong 曹洞, or Sōtō, school of Chan Buddhism. Though he was known to never have taken students of his own or teach the dharma (Sengai), Xianzi was renowned for his eccentricities. Specifically, he was known to catch and eat shrimp, clams, and prawns from nearby lakes and streams, despite the Buddhist prohibition against consuming meat. Paradoxically, Xianzi was said to have attained enlightenment a moment after he had caught a shrimp and was preparing himself to consume it. For this reason, he was understood to be an enlightened individual and carrier of the transmission, rather than a degenerate monk and rule breaker.

In addition to his eccentricities regarding the consumption of meat, Xianzi was known as a wanderer, never living in or belonging to an official monastery despite his lineage ties to the founder of one of Chinese preeminent schools of Chan Buddhism. Instead, he preferred to mingle with laypeople, spending most of his days catching his dinner. He did not wear the elaborate robes of a more traditional Chinese monk, instead wearing the same ragged robe during both summer and winter. At night, he slept beneath the paper offerings at the White Horse Temple, much as a homeless would in the modern day. Some have even speculated that he was crazy, although some secondary sources suggest that he was just feigning madness.

=== Vinaya Code ===
The Vinaya was the set of rules and principles that governed many Buddhist monastic communities. Among these rules were prohibitions against having sexual intercourse, regulations on begging, and an iron-clad ban on eating meat. Monks who broke these rules were said to have committed “pārājika,” or the eight misbehaviors and were declared “asaṃvāsa,” which means outside of the Buddhist religious community. Those deemed outside of the Buddhist religious community were not excommunicated per se, but rather were seen as deviants who were not representative of the tradition that they espoused. As someone who routinely ate fish, Xianzi would have certainly been considered asaṃvāsa under the Vinaya Code. The very paintings of Xianzi violate the Vinaya Code to a certain degree, because scholarship shows that originally, the code prohibited humor and laughter, believing it to be counterproductive to a monk's serious undertakings.

Other parts of the Vinaya Code insist on humility and poverty. The expensive, elaborate robes of high society were frowned on, and monks were supposed to wear the cast-off rags of society. Additionally, in the late 8th century, the Chan master Bozhang recognized the changing dynamics of monastic life, and created the Bozhang qinggui 百丈淸規, which were additional rules for monastic life. These new rules reformed the ways that monks obtained their food, mandating that monks devote part of their time not just to begging for alms, but instead providing some sort of labor, causing monks to work for their food. Many farms were set up alongside monasteries as a result. Although Xianzi did break some basic Vinaya rules, he also upheld others. His dress is simple and although his consumption of meat may have been blasphemous, he did fulfill the responsibility laid out in the Bozhang qinggui of laboring for his food.

=== Xianzi as a Symbol of Zen Humor ===
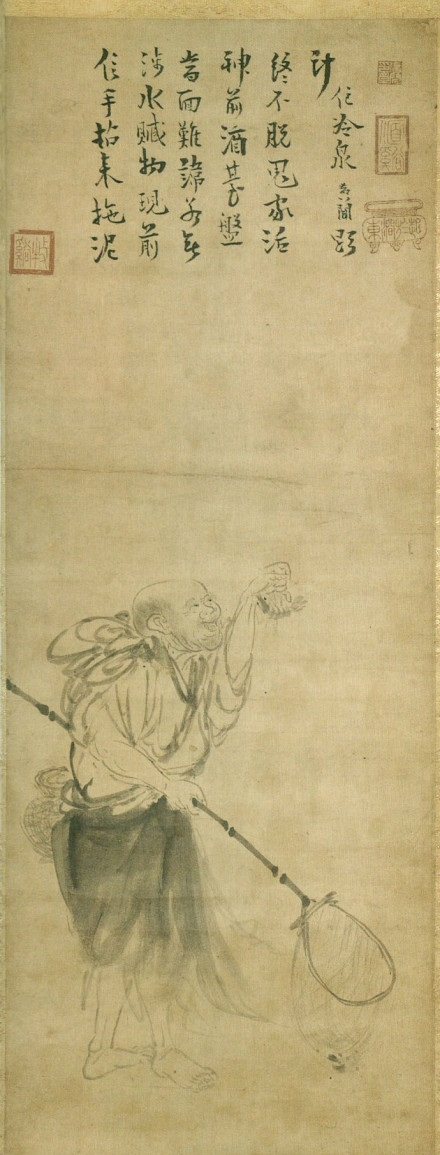
The Shrimp Eater. Hanging scroll with inscription done by the monk-painter Muqi Fachang during mid-13th century China.

Humor is thought to be one of the defining elements of Chan/Zen teaching, and that humor is almost certainly reflected in the case of Xianzi. Some argue that Chan/Zen masters used humor as a means of conveying its essential wordless transmission. In a similar way that Mahākāśyapa wordlessly received the transmission of the dharma through Śākyamuni Buddha's flower sermon, so too will those who look upon a humorous Chan/Zen painting wordlessly receive the transmission, provided that they get the joke. Understanding humor requires rigor and training, because humor without full-mindedness is grotesque and meaningless, while full-mindedness without awareness of its limitations is empty. In this way, it is argued that Chan/Zen humor is used to replicate the experience of no-mind that Chan/Zen teachings are based on.

Zen humor, as in the case of Xianzi, is typically irreverent and iconoclastic. The paradox of Xianzi is that even though he shamelessly breaks monastic rules by eating meat, that is the way in which he achieved enlightenment. An inscription on a painting of Xianzi by the Chinese monk-painter Muqi Fachang 牧溪法常 (ca. 1210-ca. 1279) alludes to this, reading:

Picking up his net at random and dragging it through the mud,

Wading across the water, illicit goods emerge before him
He comes face to face with this troublesome taboo
If the offering tray from the altar for the gods is missing,

It is because in the end he never cast off the handiwork of demons

— Unknown

.

This kind of irreverence for Buddhist teachings and traditions is repeated in other figures such as the ebullient Budai/Hotei 布袋, known literally as the laughing monk. It is speculated that the reason for Chan/Zen's strong use of humor is that although Chan/Zen Buddhism held itself as being unique for having received the true transmission in an unbroken lineage from Shakyamuni Buddha, in everyday life there were few things that separated Chan/Zen monks from those of other sects. They frequently lived in the same monasteries, abided by the same rules, and read the same sutras. Humor was used to differentiate Chan/Zen from the rest, because it made fun of the very precepts that all of the other schools adhered to so rigorously. By asserting its iconoclastic side, Chan/Zen teachings professed their true knowledge and possession of the transmission.

=== The Scattered Sages ===
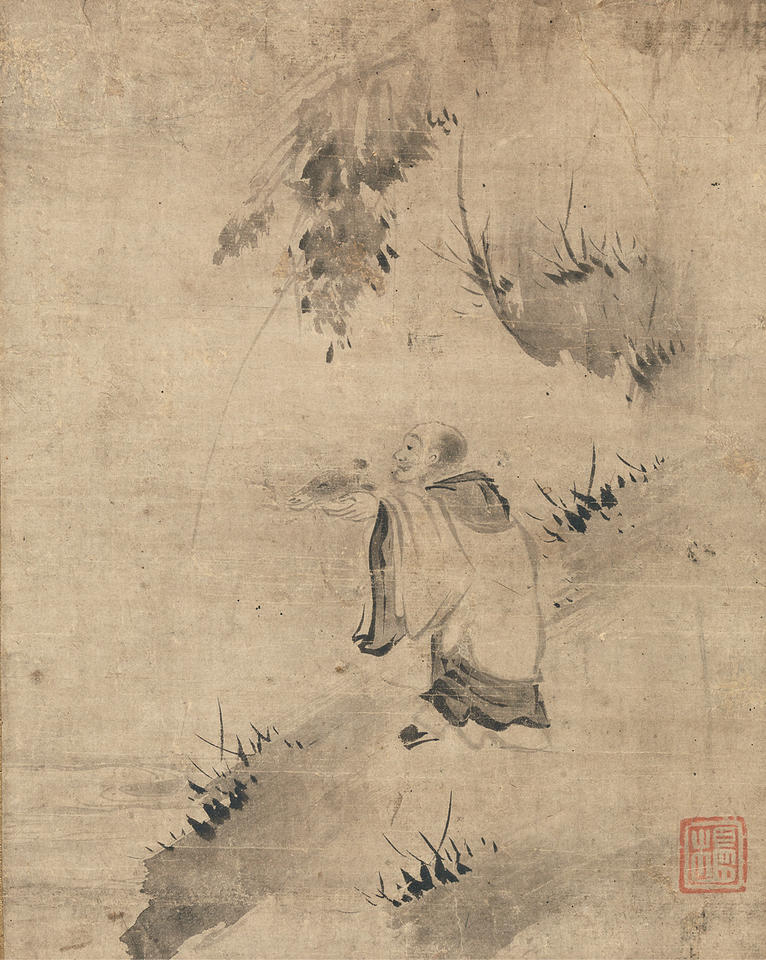
The Zen Eccentric Zhutou (Zhimeng.) Painted in the early 16th-century Muromachi period Japan by Yogetsu.

Xianzi is one of several traditional Chan/Zen figures known as the “scattered sages,” many of which are depicted with in the same humorous, iconoclastic light. Examples of other Scattered Sages include the laughing monk Budai/Hotei, Tanka 丹霞 the icon burner, the Four Sleepers (Hanshan 寒山, Shide 拾得, Fenggan 豐干, and Fenggan's tiger,) and Zhimeng 智猛.

Zhimeng in particular bears similarities to Xianzi, because he was a figure famous for eating pig's heads as his favorite treat, much in the same way that Xianzi favored eating shrimp. As a result of their similarities, it was not uncommon for hanging scrolls of Xianzi and Zhimeng to be exhibited together. The artist Yogetsu (1405–1496,) for instance, painted the two individually, but their paintings are strikingly similar and are displayed together.

Some scholars theorize that many of the Scattered Sages actually predate Chan/Zen Buddhism and exist outside of its religious context. They were absorbed into the Chan/Zen pantheon as a means of co-opting traditional Chinese culture, enhancing Chan/Zen's cultural appeal and diverting local customs into a Buddhist framework. However, the evidence for this in the case of Xianzi is limited and no hard conclusions can be drawn.

== Visual Representation ==
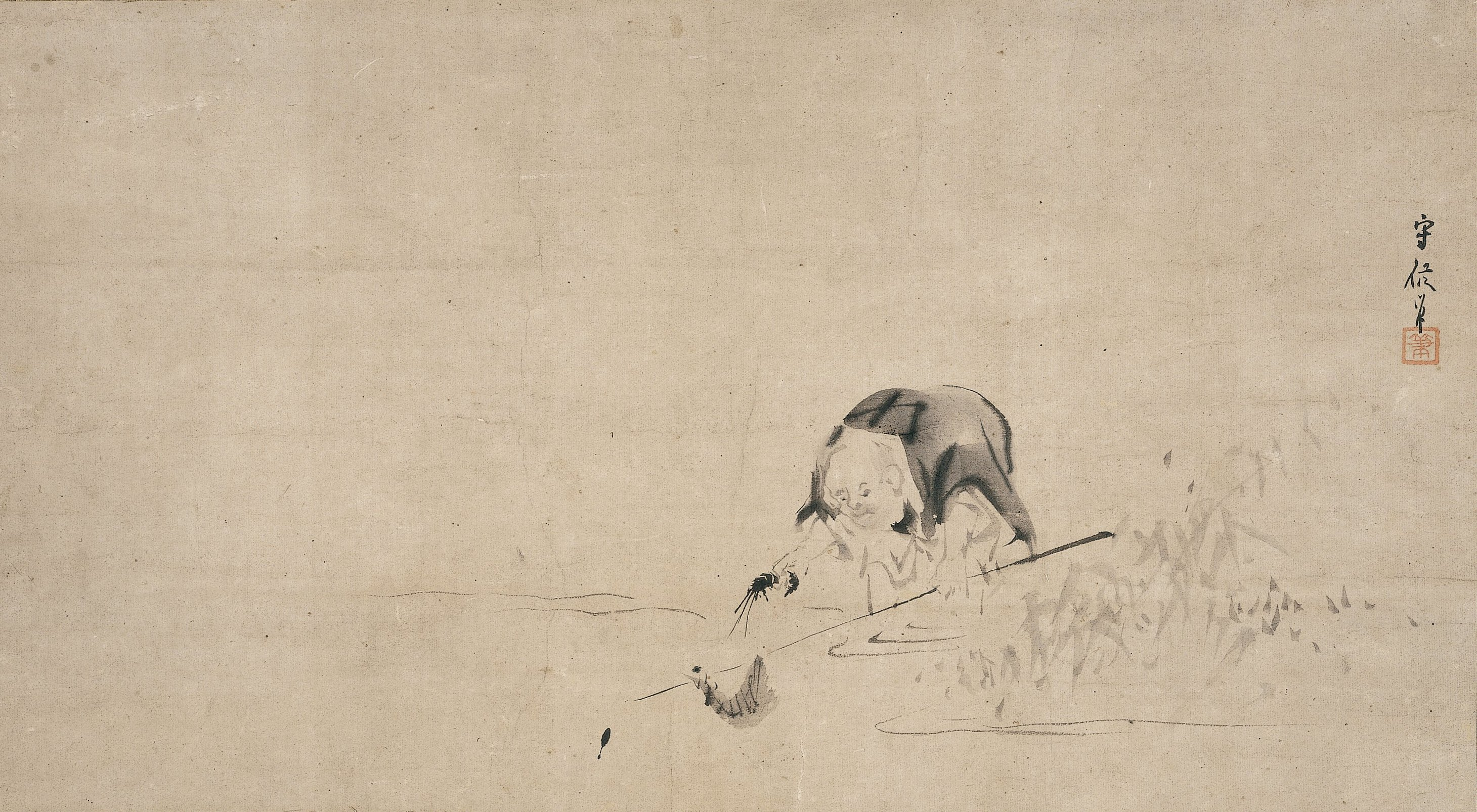
Xianzi, the Shrimp Eater. Painted by the artist Kano Tan'yu in the 17th century. Property of the Minneapolis Institute of Art.

Although his name can be translated as “Master Clam” and in his biography he is said to have eaten both shrimp and clams, Xianzi is always painted holding a shrimp in his hand and never a clam. Additionally, he is frequently painted with his fishing net in one hand to show that he caught his prey himself. His beard is always painted with blurry grey brushstrokes, and although his robes are always relatively simple and never decorated or elaborate, sometimes they more closely resemble the traditional robes of monk, rather than those of a peasant. His humble lifestyle is never drawn into question and his poverty is always made clear. Lastly, all known paintings of Xianzi show him eating shrimp – details of his life outside of his shrimp-eating habit are sometimes alluded to in the inscriptions and poems written at the top of the painting, but they are never explicitly shown.

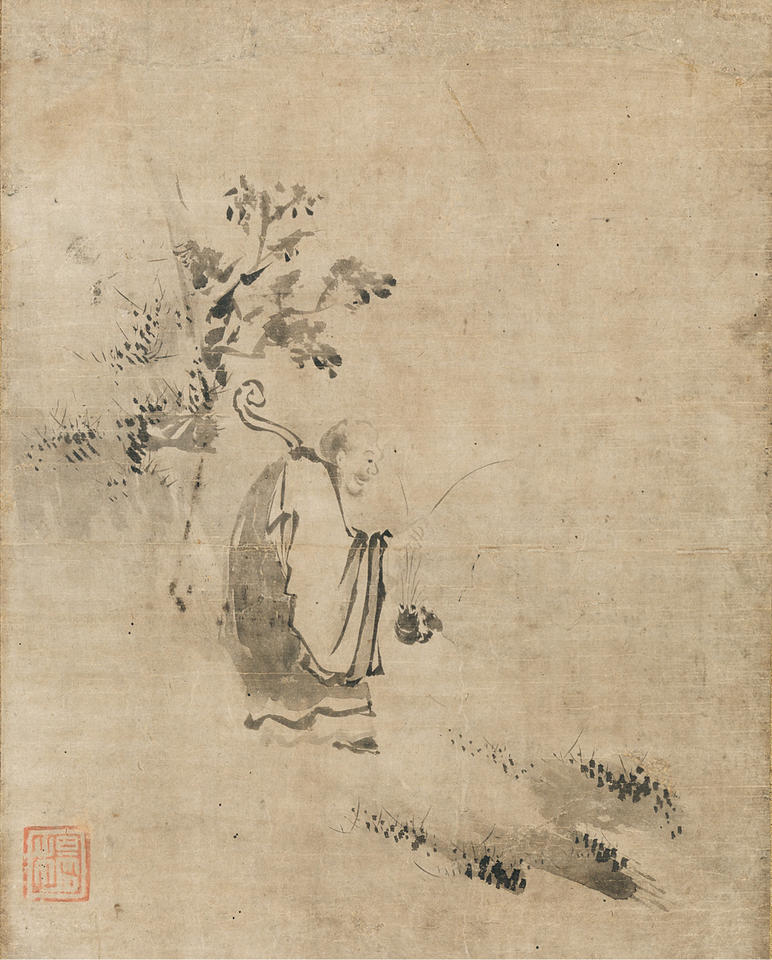
The Zen Eccentric Xianzi. Painted in the early 16th-century Muromachi period Japan by Yogetsu.

Much of Xianzi's iconography remains the same from painting to painting, but there seem to be three general categories of depicting him; in one, Xianzi holds the shrimp above his head with his mouth open as if to eat it, while in the second he holds it in front of his face at eye level, intently examining it. In the former category, Xianzi is also frequently smiling and standing more informally, while in the latter category his posture is more restrained. Although when Xianzi is painted looking at the shrimp with his mouth closed he can either be wearing the robes of a monk or the simpler, more ragged robes of the destitute, he is never painted both with his mouth open to eat the shrimp and the robes of a monk. In those paintings, his dress is not representative of the monastic tradition. The third way in which Xianzi is painted shows him actually fishing, with one shrimp already in his hand to show what exactly he is doing. He is intent on his work and pursues no other activities.

Like many paintings done of the “scattered sages,” all paintings of Xianzi are done in the style of apparition painting. They are monochromatic ink paintings, frequently executed on hanging scrolls. The reason for the dominance of this particular style is that even though most paintings of Xianzi and other Scattered Sages were done by monk painters, it is understood that the audience they were trying to appeal to was the Chinese literati and scholastic community of Song dynasty China, which preferred the apparition painting style. These paintings were frequently given as gifts to members of the scholar elite, and so they naturally reflected the tastes of their recipients.

== See also ==
- Budai/Hotei
- Muqi Fachang
- Vinaya
- Hanshan and Shide
- Dongshan Liangjie
- Kasaya (clothing)
