= Yunju Daoying =

Zen Buddhist monk

Yunju Daoying 雲居道膺
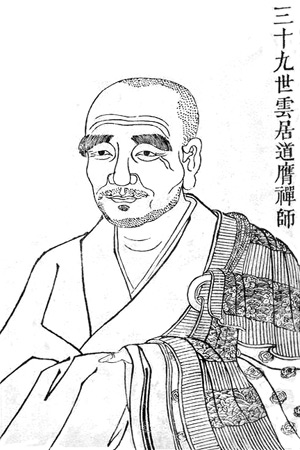
- Title: Chán master

Personal life
- Born: 830 Hubei, China
- Died: 902 (age 72)

Religious life
- Religion: Buddhism
- School: Chán

Senior posting
- Teacher: Dongshan Liangjie
- Predecessor: Dongshan Liangjie
- Successor: Tongan Daopi
- Students: Tongan Daopi

Yunju Daoying (Chinese: 雲居道膺; Japanese: Ungo Dōyō; Korean: Ungǒ Toyong; Vietnamese: Vân Cư Đạo Ưng) was a Chan/Zen Buddhist monk and teacher during the late Tang dynasty. According to traditional biographies, he became a monk when he was 25 at Yanshou Temple, although he later left to study at Mount Nan before finally taking on Dongshan Liangjie as his teacher on Mount Dong. After receiving dharma transmission from Dongshan, he went to a place called Three Peak Hermitage, and finally to Mount Yunju, northeast of modern Nanchang in Jiangxi Province. Here he established Jenru Temple, where he taught for 30 years and eventually attracted 1,500 students.

Amongst modern Caodong/Sōtō practitioners, Tongan Daopi is commonly regarded as Yunju's successor through whom the Caodong teaching descended. This view comes from Huihong's Sengbao zhuan, which was completed in 1119, long after Yunju's life. Contemporary information, however, disagrees with this version of history. The Zutang ji (Patriarch's Hall Record), which was completed in 952, covers the life of Yunju Daoying, but does not mention Tongan Daopi as his disciple. The Zutang ji does, however, record someone with the name Tongan asking a question to Yunju Daoying. The scholar Ui Hakuju has written this could likely refer to Tongan Daopi. However, in the Transmission of the Lamp, which was compiled around 1004, Tongan Daopi is mentioned as a student of Yunju.

The Transmission of the Lamp also claims that Tongan had no students himself. In other words, the Caodong school did not descend through Yunju as is commonly thought, but rather through another student of Dongshan Liangjie, namely Jufeng Puman. The scholar Morten Schlütter suggests that the lineage according to the Transmission of the Lamp is more likely correct because Dayang Jingshuan, who in Huihong's version of the lineage is a descendant of Yunju, is recorded in the Transmission of the Lamp as being descended through Jufeng Puman. Dayang was close with Wang Shu, one of the compilers of Transmission of the Lamp, suggesting that it is unlikely that an error would have been made therein about his own lineage.

Buddhist titles
Preceded by Dongshan Liangjie	Caodong Chan/Sōtō Zen patriarch	Succeeded by Tongan Daopi
