= Five Ranks =

Poem describing the stages of realization in Zen Buddhism

The "Five Ranks" (Chinese: 五位; pinyin: Wuwei; Japanese: go-i) is a poem consisting of five stanzas describing the stages of realization in the practice of Chan/Zen Buddhism. It expresses the interplay of absolute and relative truth and the fundamental non-dualism of Buddhist teaching.

== Origins ==
The ranks are referenced in the Song of the Precious Mirror Samadhi. This work is attributed to the Chinese Caodong (Sōtō) monk Dongshan Liangjie (Japanese: Tōzan Ryōkan), who lived during the end of the Tang dynasty, as well as two sets of verse commentaries by him. The teachings of the Five Ranks may be inspired by the Cantongqi (Japanese: Sandōkai), a poem attributed to Shitou Xiqian (traditional Chinese: 石頭希遷).

The work is highly significant in both the Caodong/Sōtō and Linji/Rinzai schools of Zen that exist today. Eihei Dogen, the founder of the Japanese Sōtō School, references the Five Ranks in the first paragraph of one of his most widely studied works, Genjōkōan. Hakuin integrated the Five Ranks in his system of koan-teaching.

== Ranks ==
The Five Ranks are listed below with two translations of the original poem, the first by Miura and Sasaki, and the second by Thomas Cleary, followed by commentary and analysis:

=== I: The Relative within the Absolute ===
In the third watch of the night

Before the moon appears,
No wonder when we meet
There is no recognition!
Still cherished in my heart

Is the beauty of earlier days.

In the third watch,

beginning of the night,
before the moon is bright,
do not wonder
at meeting without recognition;
still held hidden in the heart

is the beauty of former days

This rank describes the Absolute, insight into the empty nature or not-"thing"-ness of everything. The scholar Heinrich Dumoulin describes the first rank as the realization that "all diverse things and events are in their essence the same, formless and empty. Emptiness is undisturbed by any subjective element". According to Hakuin, this rank is only the beginning of Zen insight, but it can become a trap for people who take the absolute to be the end-station: "Although inside and out may be perfectly clear as long as you are hidden away in an unfrequented place where there is absolute quiet and nothing to do, yet you are powerless as soon as perception touches upon different worldly situations, with all their clamor and emotion, and you are beset by a plethora of miseries".

=== II: The Absolute within the Relative ===
A sleepy-eyed grandma

Encounters herself in an old mirror.
Clearly she sees a face,
But it doesn't resemble her at all.
Too bad, with a muddled head,

She tries to recognize her reflection!

A woman who's overslept

encounters an ancient mirror;
clearly she sees her face-
there is no other reality.
Nevertheless, she still mistakes

her reflection for her head

The second rank describes the recognition of the Absolute within "the midst of the variety of different situations in action; you see everything before your eyes as your own original true clean face, just as if you were looking at your face in the mirror" (Hakuin). That is, unlike the insight of the first rank, which can be easily disturbed, the second rank has greater constancy in the face of distractions. However, seeing the absolute within the relative does not extend to one's behavior towards others. Hakuin describes that at this point one "is neither conversant with the deportment of the bodhisattva, nor does he understand the causal conditions for a Buddha-land. Although he has a clear understanding of the Universal and True Wisdom, he cannot cause to shine forth the Marvelous Wisdom that comprehends the unobstructed interpenetration of the manifold dharmas." (Note: Hakuin's commentary on the Five Ranks, first published in The Zen Koan (1965) by Isshu Miura and Ruth Fuller Sasaki)

=== III: Coming from within the Absolute ===
Within nothingness there is a path

Leading away from the dusts of the world.
Even if you observe the taboo
On the present emperor's name,
You will surpass that eloquent one of yore

Who silenced every tongue.

Within nothingness is a road

out of the dust;
just be able to avoid violating
the present taboo name
and you will surpass
the eloquence of yore

that silenced every tongue.

This rank describes enlightened behaviour: "Enlightened beings do not dwell in the state of result they have realized; from the ocean of effortlessness, they radiate unconditional compassion".

=== IV: Arrival at Mutual Integration ===
When two blades cross points,

There's no need to withdraw.
The master swordsman
Is like the lotus blooming in the fire.
Such a man has in and of himself

A heaven-soaring spirit.

When two blades cross,

no need to flee;
an expert is like
a lotus in fire-
clearly there is a spirit

spontaneously soaring.

The fourth rank describes "the bodhisattva of indomitable spirit" who "go[es] into the marketplace extending their hands, acting for others". It is powerful enlightened behaviour. "This is what is called being on the road without leaving home, leaving home without being on the road. Is this an ordinary person? Is this a sage? Demons and outsiders cannot discern such a person; even Buddhas and Zen masters can do nothing". But even this "cannot be considered the place to sit in peace [...] You must know there is another rank, attainment in both".

=== V: Unity Attained ===
Who dares to equal him

Who falls into neither being nor non-being!
All men want to leave
The current of ordinary life,
But he, after all, comes back

To sit among the coals and ashes.

If you are not trapped

in being or nonbeing,
who can dare to join you?
Everyone wants to leave
the ordinary current,
but in the final analysis
you come back

and sit in the ashes.

The fifth rank describes "the mellow maturity of consciousness". According to Sekida, this rank is described in case 13 of the Mumonkan:

One day Tokusan went down toward the dining room, holding his bowls.

Seppõ met him and asked, "Where are you off to with your bowls? The bell has not rung, and the drum has not sounded." Tokusan turned and went back to his room.
Seppõ mentioned this to Gantõ, who remarked, "Tokusan is renowned, but he does not know the last word."
Tokusan heard about this remark and sent his attendant to fetch Gantõ. "You do not approve of me?" he asked.
Gantõ whispered his meaning.
Tokusan said nothing at the time, but the next day he ascended the rostrum, and behold! he was very different from usual!
Gantõ, going toward the front of the hall, clapped his hands and laughed loudly, saying, "Congratulations! Our old man has got hold of the last word!

From now on, nobody in this whole country can outdo him!" (Note: Tokusan Holds His Bowls)

== Interplay of Absolute and Relative ==
Absolute	Relative
Straight	Bend
One	Manifold
Identical	Different
Universal	Particular
Noumenal	Phenomenal
Li	Shih
Absolute	Appearance
Dark	Light
Ri	Ji
Chang	P'ien
Real	Apparent
Ideal	Actual

When Buddhism was introduced to China, the Two Truths doctrine was a point of confusion. Chinese thinking took this to refer to two ontological truths: reality exists of two modalities. The doctrines of Buddha-nature and Sunyata were understood as akin to Dao and the Taoist non-being. It was centuries later that Chinese Buddhism took Sunyata to mean the underlying unchanging essence of reality, the non-duality of being and non-being.

In Madhyamaka the Two Truths are two epistemological truths: two different ways to look at reality, a relative truth and an ultimate truth. The Prajnaparamita-sutras and Madhyamaka emphasized the non-duality of form and emptiness: form is emptiness, emptiness is form, as the heart sutra says. The ultimate truth in Madhyamaka is the truth that everything is empty (Sunyata), that which is an underlying unchanging essence. Sunyata itself is also "empty," 'the emptiness of emptiness', which means that Sunyata itself does not constitute a higher or ultimate "essence" or "reality." (Note: See also Susan Kahn, The Two Truths of Buddhism and The Emptiness of Emptiness)

Based on their understanding of the Mahayana Mahaparinirvana Sutra the Chinese supposed that the teaching of the Buddha-nature was, as stated by that sutra, the final Buddhist teaching, and that there is an essential truth above Sunyata and the Two Truths. The idea that ultimate reality is present within the daily world of relative reality melded well with Chinese culture, which emphasized the mundane world and society. But this does not tell how the absolute is present in the relative world:

To deny the duality of samsara and nirvana, as the Perfection of Wisdom does, or to demonstrate logically the error of dichotomizing conceptualization, as Nagarjuna does, is not to address the question of the relationship between samsara and nirvana -or, in more philosophical terms, between phenomenal and ultimate reality [...] What, then, is the relationship between these two realms?

This question is answered in such schemata as the Five Ranks and the Oxherding Pictures. Various terms are used for "absolute" and "relative."

== See also ==
- Ten Bulls
- Four ways of knowing
- Lamrim
- Four stages of enlightenment
- Bodhisattva Stages
- Enlightenment in Buddhism
- Subitism
- Essence-Function

== Sources ==
=== Printed sources ===
- Cleary, Thomas (1992), Shobogenzo: Zen Essays by Dogen, University of Hawaii Press, ISBN 978-0-8248-1401-4
- Dumoulin, Heinrich (2005a), Zen Buddhism: A History. Volume 1: India and China, World Wisdom Books, ISBN 978-0-941532-89-1
- Garfield, Jay (2002), Empty Words: Buddhist Philosophy and Cross-cultural Interpretation, Oxford University Press
- Hakuin (2005), The Five Ranks. In: Classics of Buddhism and Zen. The Collected Translations of Thomas Cleary. Volume Three. Pages 297-305, Boston, MA: Shambhala
- Kasulis, Thomas P. (2003), Ch'an Spirituality. In: Buddhist Spirituality. Later China, Korea, Japan and the Modern World; edited by Takeuchi Yoshinori, Delhi: Motilal Banarsidass
- Lai, Whalen (2003), Buddhism in China: A Historical Survey. In Antonio S. Cua (ed.): Encyclopedia of Chinese Philosophy (PDF), New York: Routledge, archived from the original (PDF) on November 12, 2014
- Leighton, Taigen Daniel (2000), Cultivating the Empty Field: The Silent Illumination of Zen Master Hongzhi, Tuttle Publishing, ISBN 978-0-8048-3240-3
- Liang-Chieh (1986), The Record of Tung-shan, Translated by William F. Powell, Kuroda Institute
- Loori, John Daido (2000). "River Seeing the River". In Stephanie Kaza; Kenneth Kraft (eds.). Dharma Rain: Sources of Buddhist Environmentalism. Shambhala Publications. ISBN 1-57062-475-5.
- Miura, Isshu; Sasaki, Ruth Fuller (1965). The Zen Koan: Its History and Use in Rinzai Zen. Harcourt, Brace and World, Inc., New York. ISBN 978-0156999816.
- Miura, Isshu; Sasaki, Ruth Fuller (1966). Zen Dust: The History of the Koan and Koan Study in Rinzai Zen. First Zen Institute of America in Japan. ASIN B0006BZGV6.
- Sekida (translator), Katsuki (1996), Two Zen Classics. Mumonkan, The Gateless Gate. Hekiganroku, The Blue Cliff Records. Translated with commentaries by Katsuki Sekida, New York / Tokyo: Weatherhill
- Siderits, Mark (2003), "On the Soteriological Significance of Emptiness", Contemporary Buddhism, 4 (1): 9–23, doi:10.1080/1463994032000140158, S2CID 144783831
- Verdú, Alfonso (1966). "The "Five Ranks" Dialectic of the Soto-Zen School in the Light of Kuei-Feng Tsung-Mi's "Ariya-Shiki" Scheme". Monumenta Nipponica. 21 (1/2). Sophia University: 125–170. doi:10.2307/2383409. JSTOR 2383409.
- Verdú, Alfonso (1974). Dialiectical Aspects in Buddhist Thought: Studies in Sino-Japanese Mahāyāna Idealism. International Studies, East Asian Series Reprint No. 8. Kansas City: University of Kansas, Center for East Asian Studies.
- Wegner, Michael (2001), Introduction to "Branching streams flow in the darkness: Zen talks on the Sandokai"by Shunryū Suzuki, University of California Press, ISBN 978-0-520-23212-9
