= Tongan Guanzhi =

Chinese Buddhist monk

Tongan Guanzhi 同安觀志
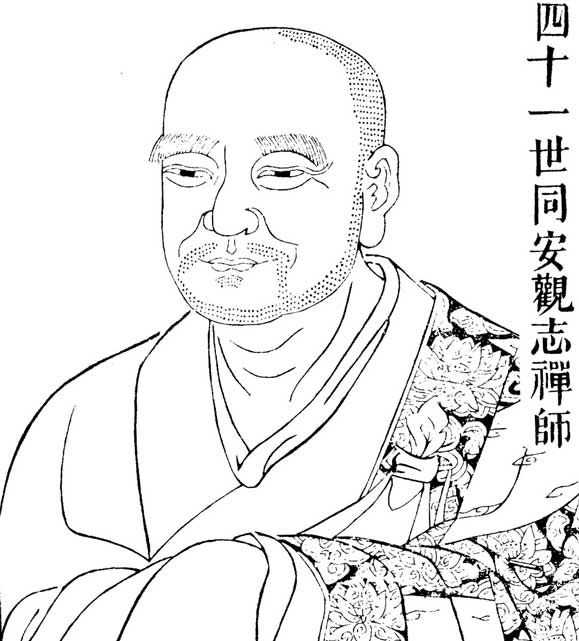
- Title: Chán master

Personal life
- Born: China

Religious life
- Religion: Buddhism
- School: Chán

Senior posting
- Teacher: Tongan Daopi or Tongan Wei (see text)
- Predecessor: Tongan Daopi or Tongan Wei (see text)
- Successor: Liangshan Yuanguan
- Students: Liangshan Yuanguan

Tongan Guanzhi (Chinese: 同安觀志; Japanese: Dōan Kanshi) was a Chan/Zen Buddhist monk during the Five Dynasties and Ten Kingdoms period in 10th century China. Traditionally, he is considered to be the student of Tongan Daopi. However, the basis for this belief comes from a text by Huihong called the Chanlin sengbao zhuan (Chronicle of the Sangha Treasure in the Groves of Chan), which was completed in 1119, many years after Tongan's death.

== History ==
Tongan Guanzhi's name first appears in the Transmission of the Lamp, which was compiled around 1004. However, in that work, he is not listed as a student of Tongan Daopi. In fact, it states Daopi has no students at all. The Transmission of the Lamp instead claims that Tongan Guanzhi is the disciple of Tongan Wei, in turn a student of Jufeng Puman, with Jufeng being an apparently obscure student of the famous Dongshan Liangjie.

Both Tongan Wei and Jufeng Puman are listed for the first time in the Transmission of the Lamp, and neither with much information. However, Dayang Jingxuan, who in Huihong's version of the lineage is a descendant of Tonagan Daopi, is recorded in the Transmission of the Lamp as being descended through Jufeng Puman and Tongan Wei. Dayang was close with Wang Shu, one of the compilers of Transmission of the Lamp, and as such it is unlikely that an error would have been made therein about his lineage.

This suggests that Tongan Guanzhi is more likely to have been a student of Tongan Wei and not Tongan Daopi.

Buddhist titles
Preceded by Tongan Daopi	Caodong Chan/Sōtō Zen patriarch	Succeeded by Liangshan Yuanguan
