= Chi Kwang Sunim =

Australian Buddhist nun

Venerable Chi Kwang Sunim

Religious life
- Religion: Zen Buddhist

Senior posting
- Teacher: Kusan

Venerable Chi Kwang Sunim is a Zen Buddhist nun. She is currently the leader of a small community and forest retreat in Kinglake, Victoria.

== Training ==
Chi Kwang studied Seon (Zen) meditation in Songgansa under the Zen master Kusan. She also studied under Myongseong Sunim, Proctor of Unmun Sa Temple.

Chi Kwang was ordained as a bhikkhunī (fully ordained female monastic) in South Korea and is associated with the Lotus Lantern International Buddhist Centre in South Korea.

In Blossoms of the Dharma: Living as a Buddhist Nun she writes that "the Korean bhikkhunis have established a systematic, effective way of training new nuns." This includes a novice period, sutra study schools and then meditation halls or other vocations.

In 1988 she returned to live in Australia but makes bi-annual trips back to South Korea.

== Leadership ==
Chi Kwang is the chair of the Seon Centre in Kinglake. She has been the chair of the Australian Sangha Association and the Buddhist Council of Victoria. Chi Kwang is involved with intra-Buddhist and interfaith programs.
