= Liangshan Yuanguan =

Liangshan Yuanguan 粱山緣觀
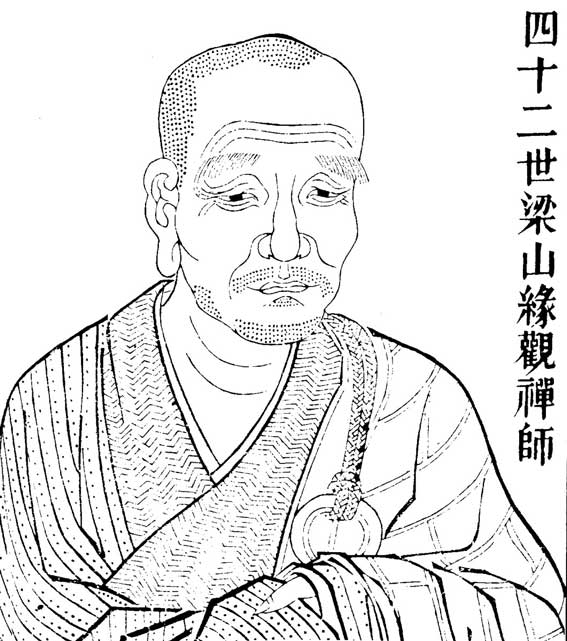
- Title: Chán master

Personal life
- Born: China

Religious life
- Religion: Buddhism
- School: Chán

Senior posting
- Teacher: Tongan Guanzhi
- Predecessor: Tongan Guanzhi
- Successor: Dayang Jingxuan
- Students: Dayang Jingxuan

Liangshan Yuanguan (simplified Chinese: 梁山缘观; traditional Chinese: 粱山緣觀; Wade–Giles: Liang-shan Yüan-kuan; Japanese: Ryōzan Enkan) was a Chan/Zen Buddhist monk during the Five Dynasties and Ten Kingdoms period. His first appearance in the historical record is in the Transmission of the Lamp, which was compiled around 1004. No precise dates are available for when he lived, and information about his life is scant.

Buddhist titles
Preceded by Tongan Guanzhi	Caodong Chan/Sōtō Zen patriarch	Succeeded by Dayang Jingxuan
