= Yunyan Tansheng =

Yunyan Tansheng 雲巖曇晟
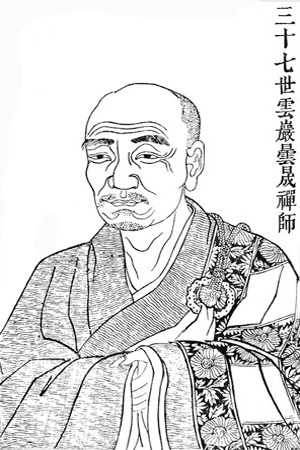
- Title: Chán master

Personal life
- Born: 780 Jianchang, China
- Died: 841 (age 61)

Religious life
- Religion: Buddhism
- School: Chán

Senior posting
- Teacher: Yaoshan Weiyan; Baizhang Huaihai
- Predecessor: Yaoshan Weiyan
- Successor: Dongshan Liangjie
- Students: Dongshan Liangjie

Yunyan Tansheng (Chinese: 雲巖曇晟; pinyin: Yúnyán Tánshèng; Wade–Giles: Yün-yen T'an-shêng; Japanese: Ungan Donjō; Korean: Unam Tamsŭng; Vietnamese: Vân Nham Đàm Thạnh) was a Chan Buddhist monk during the Tang dynasty. Ancient biographies record that he was from Jianchang. He is said to have become a monk when he was sixteen at Shimen Temple with Baizhang Huaihai as his teacher. After twenty years with him, Baizhang died and Yuyan had still had not attained enlightenment. He visited many teachers before settling on Yaoshan Weiyan as his new master. The first part of his name comes from Yunyan Mountain, which is outside of modern Changsha, where he taught after studying with Yaoshan. Recorded dialogues involving Yunyan often include him and his fellow student, Daowu Yuanzhi. He supposedly died from illness, the day before which he ordered his students to prepare for a banquet because a monk was preparing to depart the monastery.

A well known poem, the Song of the Precious Mirror Samādhi, is attributed to Yunyan in Juefan Huihong's biographical compilation of 1119, the Chanlin sengbao zhuan (Chronicle of the Saṅgha Treasure in the Groves of Chán). This is the first time this poem is mentioned in the historical record. Huihong writes that the poem was given to Dongshan Liangjie, Yunyan's student, but that he believes Yunyan's teacher probably gave it to him in turn. Huihong further relates that he came upon the poem in 1108, when it was given to a scholar Zhu Yan by a monk, whom he does not identify. The scholar Morten Schlütter notes that the poem's provenance is doubtful given the way it came to Huihong, and furthermore the style differs substantially from works of the era that Huihong attributes it to. Most later historical sources, such as the Zengaku daijiten, the Bussho kaisetsu daijiten, and Shinsan zenseki mokuroku, attribute the poem to Dongshan Liangjie rather than Yunyan, although again, neither is likely.

== Appearance in Kōan ==
A number of kōan dialogues feature Yunyan and his fellow student Daowu Yuanzhi. Case 54 of the Book of Equanimity, Case 89 of the Blue Cliff Record, case 105 from Dōgen's Shinji Shōbōgenzō, and the chapter "Kannon" from Dōgen's Kana Shōbōgenzō, and all involve the same story in which Yunyan and Daowu discuss the purpose of Avalokiteśvara's many hands and eyes. The precise intention of the story varies with each version.

Buddhist titles
Preceded by Yaoshan Weiyan	Caodong Chan/Sōtō Zen patriarch	Succeeded by Dongshan Liangjie
