= Yaoshan Weiyan =

Chan Buddhist monk (745–827)

Yaoshan Weiyan 藥山惟儼
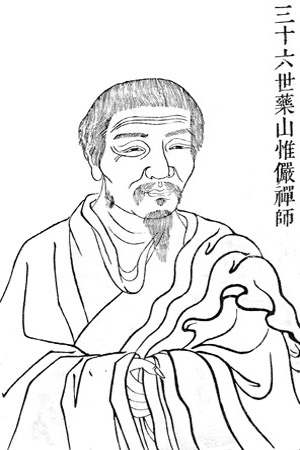
- Title: Chan master

Personal life
- Born: 745 Jiangxi, China
- Died: 827 (age 82)

Religious life
- Religion: Buddhism
- School: Chán

Senior posting
- Teacher: Shitou Xiqian; Mazu Daoyi
- Predecessor: Shitou Xiqian
- Successor: Yunyan Tansheng
- Students: Yunyan Tansheng Daowu Yuanzhi

Yaoshan Weiyan (Chinese: 藥山惟儼; Hànyǔ Pīnyīn: Yàoshān Wéiyǎn; Japanese: Yakusan Igen; Korean: Yaksan Yuǒm; Vietnamese: Dược Sơn Duy Nghiễm) was a Chan/Zen Buddhist monk who lived during the Tang dynasty.

== Biography ==
As with most monks of the Tang Dynasty, there are conflicting lines of evidence concerning Yaoshan's life. The earliest biographical information comes from Tang Shen, who wrote Yaoshan's epitaph in 834, seven years after his death. While he is traditionally regarded as a student of Shitou Xiqian, Tang Shen's inscription mentions that he stayed with Mazu Daoyi for nearly twenty years. It also mentions Shitou as his teacher, however. Some scholars consider the epitaph to be a later forgery, although many elements of it agree with other sources. A story dating to the middle of the eleventh century relates an encounter between Yaoshan and Shitou in which Yaoshan failed to awaken, but a later visit to Mazu results in his enlightenment. This is almost certainly a fanciful jibe at Shitou and praise for Mazu, however.

== Nonthinking ==
A story involving Yaoshan is frequently referenced in the writing of Dōgen, the founder of the Sōtō school in Japan. The story is as follows:

Once, when the Master was sitting, a monk asked him, "What are you thinking of, [sitting there] so fixedly?"
The master answered, "I'm thinking of not thinking (思量箇不思量底 sīliàng gè bùsīliàng [Japanese: fushiryō] dǐ)."
The monk asked, "How do you think of not thinking?"
The Master answered, "Nonthinking (非思量 fēi sīliàng [Japanese: hishiryō])."

— Transmission of the Lamp,

According to Carl Bielefeldt, a religious studies professor at Stanford University, this passage encapsulates the essence of Dōgen's teaching on zazen. Because of this, it is referenced frequently in his works, such as in the Shōbōgenzō, Eihei Kōroku, and most prominently his early work the Fukan zazengi.

In another passage;

One day, as Yaoshan was sitting, Shitou asked him, "What are you doing here?"
Yaoshan said, "I’m not doing a thing."
Shitou said, "Then you’re just sitting leisurely."
Yaoshan said, "If I were sitting leisurely I’d be doing something."

The epitaph records his teaching as thus:

"The numinous mind is pure by itself, but it is obscured by phenomenal appearances. If you can dismiss all phenomena, there will be no dual things."

This teaching emphasizes the pure mind of self nature, which had been a general concept since the early Chan.

Buddhist titles
Preceded by Shitou Xiqian	Caodong Chan/Sōtō Zen patriarch	Succeeded by Yunyan Tansheng
