= Zongxiao =

Chinese Buddhist monk

Zongxiao (宗曉, 1151-1214) was a Chinese Buddhist monk of the Tiantai school during the Song Dynasty. He is known as the author of the Anthology on the Blissful Land (Lebang wenlei, 樂邦文類), the first anthology of Chinese Pure Land texts. He is also the first person to ever write about a Pure Land Buddhist list of ancestors or patriarchs. Zongxiao's work helped establish Pure Land Buddhism as a legitimate tradition in the Song era. Zongxiao also wrote a book on Lotus Sutra devotion, The Record of The Lotus Sutra's Manifest Responses (Fahuajing xianying lu, 法華經顯應錄), which links the Lotus Sutra with rebirth in Amitabha's Pure Land, along with describing many miraculous events resulting from Lotus Sutra devotion.

== Life ==
Zongxiao (1151–1214) was a monk of the Southern Song Dynasty with the secular surname Wang born near Mingzhou (modern Ningbo, Zhejiang Province). His courtesy name was Daxian, and he was also known by the sobriquet Shizhi. At the age of eighteen, he received full ordination. Zongxiao studied under two lesser known figures, Master Juan Qiang (d.u.) and Master Yun'an Hong (d.u.). Zongxiao was part of Siming Zhili's lineage. Not long after, he became the abbot of Cuiluo Temple in Changguo, north of Mingzhou, where scholars gathered around him.

Later, he retreated to the Western Mountains, a part of the Siming mountain range located west of Mingzhou. He dedicated himself daily to the recitation of the Lotus Sutra, a practice he continued throughout his life. After living in the mountains for some time, he went on a three year tour to various temples in the Western Circuit of the Liangzhe region (present Zhejiang and Jiangsu).

After three years he returned to Mingzhou (Ningbo), where he received an official position (possibly an abbacy of a monastery). He became the main lecturer at Yanqing Monastery, where he spent the rest of his life. In addition to teaching, he compiled works such as The Record of The Lotus Sutra's Manifest Responses and Anthology of the Bliss Land. He also wrote various other works, including records of Tiantai patriarchs like Siming Zhili. He was also active in the Jiangnan region and had connections with high rank officials there.

Additionally, he is famous for having copied the Lotus Sutra in his own blood. He copied other sutras, including the Avatamsaka, Maharatnakuta, Prajñaparamita, and Nirvana Sutras, in ink. Zongxiao once dug a charitable well in the southern city of Li She, naming it "Lotus Flower Spring," and built a pavilion over it to offer tea to passersby. He propagated Buddhist teachings for over forty years and devoted himself even more deeply to study and practice in his later years. He died in 1214 at the age of sixty-four.

== Works ==
Zongxiao was a prolific author. His main works include:

- Anthology of the Land of Bliss (Lèbāng wénlèi 樂邦文類, T.1969A)
- The Record of The Lotus Sutra's Manifest Responses (Fahuajing xianying lu, 法華經顯應錄).
- Commentary on the Golden Light Sutra (金光明經照解)
- Record of the Teachings and Practices of the Venerable Siming (Siming zunzhe jiaoxing lu 四明尊者教行 錄, T 1937)
- Collection of Baoyun's Teachings (寶雲 振祖集), a collection of the writings of Siming Zhili's teacher, Yitong
- Remaining Manuscripts of the Land of Bliss (Lebang Yigao 樂邦遺稿), another Pure Land collection
- Survey of [rites] for distributing food [to hungry ghosts] (Shishi tonglan 施食通覽, XZJ 101, dated 1204 AD)
- Rite for the yulanpen offering (Lanpen xiangong yi)

=== Anthology on the Blissful Land ===
Zongxiao wrote the earliest known anthology of Pure Land writings, titled Anthology on the Blissful Land, compiled in 1199 CE. The anthology includes 247 texts, most of which were authored during the Song dynasty. As a result, this collection has become an important resource for examining the evolution of Pure Land teachings in that period. It includes many different genres, including: Sutra 經, Dharani 咒, Treatise 論, Preface and Postscript 序跋, Prose 文, Eulogy 讚, Account and Stele 記碑, Biography 傳, Miscellaneous Writings 雜文, Hymns 頌, and Poetry 詩. Since Zongxiao was also a Tiantai monk, the collection also contains many Pure Land works by past Tiantai masters (like Zhili, Zunshi, Zhiyuan, and Renyue), making it a key resource of Tiantai Pure Land practice. It also includes many works by lay Buddhists.

True to his Tiantai background, the Anthology on the Blissful Land begins with a discussion of the Lotus Sutra, particularly the sutra's Parable of the Conjured City. This passage describes how the Buddha Victorious through Great Penetrating Knowledge (Datong Zhisheng) taught the Lotus Sutra to his sixteen sons. Afterwards, the Buddha enters a deep meditative state for 84,000 kalpas. During this time, the sons, who are bodhisattvas, ascend the Dharma Throne to teach and convert countless beings. The passage identifies the sixteen sons as Buddhas in all ten directions, though Zongxiao's excerpt mentions only Amitabha and Śākyamuni. This highlights a direct link between Amitabha and the Lotus Sutra. Zongxiao further notes that through his preaching the Lotus over 84,000 kalpas, Amitabha formed a karmic bond with all beings who would be reborn in his Pure Land. From Zongxiao's viewpoint, the Lotus Sutra is therefore central to the soteriology of Pure Land.

By situating this collection within the vibrant anthological culture of the Song Dynasty, Zongxiao underscored the legitimacy of Pure Land teachings as a distinct Buddhist tradition. His preface outlines the historical backdrop that influenced his compilation, notably mentioning Emperor Gaozong's imperial endorsement of Pure Land practice and the widespread establishment of Pure Land societies across the empire. Zongxiao modeled his anthology after the Xihan Wenlei, a Tang Dynasty text that sought to restore literary and ethical values in Chinese writing. He hoped that the anthology would be a useful resource to the various Pure Land societies who were thriving during the Song.

The structure of Lebang Wenlei reflects Zongxiao's efforts to define and organize Pure Land literature. Canonical texts such as sutras, dharanis, and treatises are prioritized at the beginning, followed by an expansive selection of materials that explore various facets of Pure Land devotion, including artistic expressions like painting and embroidery depicting Amitabha Buddha. Notably, the legend of Huiyuan's White Lotus Society is included as a significant component of Pure Land literature. The anthology's concluding section, devoted to Pure Land literary compositions, reinforces the richness and complexity of this tradition in the Song period. By incorporating persuasive texts with vivid imagery and accessible language, Zongxiao aimed to make Pure Land teachings more relatable to the general public. Additionally, through this compilation, Zongxiao sought to protect and promote Pure Land teachings in response to critiques from Chan practitioners and Confucian scholars. By embracing a wide array of texts and perspectives, Lebang Wenlei reflects the intellectual dynamism in which Pure Land ideas were debated and refined.

Zongxiao's Anthology is also notable because it contains the first attempt to construct a list of Pure Land ancestors or patriarchs. Zongxiao's original list has six Pure Land patriarchs: Huiyuan, Shandao, Fazhao, Shaokang, Xingchang, and Changlu Zongze (長蘆宗賾, dates unknown). This was the first model for the later Chinese Pure Land patriarch lists, who always begin with Huiyuan, framing him as the founder of the Chinese "Lotus Society" tradition (i.e. Pure Land Buddhism).

=== Record of the Lotus Sutra's Manifest Responses ===
Zongxiao's Fahuajing xianying lu 法華經顯應錄 (The Record of The Lotus Sutra's Manifest Responses) contains many popular accounts of Lotus Sutra devotion. An interesting element of this work is that it blends devotion to the Lotus Sutra with the aspiration for rebirth in Amitabha's Pure Land. This is not unique to this text however, as Daniel Getz notes "in China Tiantai played an ever greater role as time progressed in assigning importance to both the Lotus Sutra and to the Pure Land tradition, all the while linking each closely to the other." The teachings of Siming Zhili also linked the practice of Lotus Sutra rites with birth in the Pure Land, so this idea is not an innovation of Zongxiao. Furthermore, for Zongxiao, the Lotus Sutra encompassed all practices, and because of this, one can attain birth in the pure land through it.

The core of this collection is the narration of biographical accounts that highlight the miraculous power of devotion to the Lotus Sutra (divided into four categories: ancient sages, monks, nuns, male and female lay faithful). It includes stories of Tiantai monks (like Zhiyi, Zhiyi's disciples, as well as monks from other traditions, such as Kuiji and Chengguan). The concept of miraculous efficacy is grounded in Buddhist karma theory and the traditional Chinese principle of stimulus and response (ganying), where the actions of the devotee create a resonance with the Buddhas, leading to a response in the form of a miraculous event. This reciprocal relationship between stimulus and response is a key component of Tiantai teaching from its inception. Zongxiao references this idea in the title of his work, Record of The Lotus Sutra's Manifest Responses, which he explains in the preface as being "taken from the Tiantai tradition's articulation of extraordinary phenomena (shengxiang) elicited by the stimulus (gan) of one's actions and speech in the present life."

Regarding the devotional practices discussed in Zongxiao's Record, emphasis is placed on extensive recitation of the entire Lotus Sutra, as well as prostrations to the Lotus Sutra and other sutras. Numerous stories outline how monks accomplished large scale feats of recitation and prostrations, commonly totaling in the tens of thousands. Zongxiao also mentions a practice which consisted in performing one or three prostrations for every character of the sutra.

== See also ==
- Wang Rixiu
- Siming Zhili
- Yuanzhao
