= Chengyuan =

Chinese Pure Land Buddhist patriarch

Banzhou Chengyuan (般舟承遠, 713–802) was a Chinese Buddhist monk who is considered the third patriarch of Pure Land Buddhism in China.

== Overview ==
Born in Sichuan with the lay surname Xie, Chengyuan studied under Master Tang of Chengdu. In 735 CE he traveled to the Jade Spring Temple (Yuquan Si) in Jingzhou (present-day Jiangling County Hubei), where he ordained as a sramanera under a certain Huizhen. He later traveled to Mount Heng in Nanyue (Hunan), where he received the full ordination from Tongxiang and further studied the sūtras and vinaya.

He later traveled to Guangzhou, where he studied under Pure Land Master Cimin Huiri, from whom he received teachings on nianfo samādhi. In 742 CE, he returned to Mount Heng (Hunan), where he established the "Amitābha Terrace" (Mituo Tai 彌 陀 臺 ) hermitage in the southwestern part of the mountain. There he lived as a hermit, surviving on simple food, diligently practicing. He is said to have attained nianfo samādhi and various visions of the Pure Land. A stele by Lu Wen says of the master: “Cutting grass and binding reeds, [he made] a small shelter to house sutras and an image, and lived without young servants. His room did not have a single peck [of grain] in storage and he didn't eat a single meal, surviving on grasses and herbs."

Over time the master's reputation grew, and monastics and laypeople came to visit him and bring him gifts. Over time, a temple grew around his hermitage. The master always lectured to those who came to see him. He also commissioned a Dharma hall and placed tablets around the mountain to remind people to recite the Buddha's name. Chengyuan's fame eventually reached Emperor Daizong of Tang, who paid respects to the master after being impressed by his disciple Fazhao. According to Collected Highlights for the Mituo Monastery, the emperor also granted him an official new temple plaque, the "Pratyutpanna Samādhi Monastery" (Banzhou Daochang), ordained new monks and held an imperial feast in his honor.

Later during the reign of Emperor Dezong, it was further granted the official title of "Amitābha Temple."

Master Chengyuan remained on Mount Heng for sixty years practicing the Pure Land way and instructing others. He passed away at ninety one.

Chengyuan had over a hundred disciples. One of them was the Pure Land master Fazhao, who himself would become a patriarch of the school. In 765, Master Fazhao left Mount Lu and became a disciple of Master Chengyuan. According to the Nanyue Mituo si Chengyuan Heshang bei (Stele of the Mituo Temple at Nanyue), Fazhao had a vision of Amitabha and the elder Chengyuan on a mountain. This lead him to Mount Heng (Hunan).

== See also ==
- Buddhism in China
- Wulong Shaokang
- Fazhao
