= Siming Zhili =

Chinese Patriarch of the Tiantai school

Siming Zhili (Chinese: 四明知禮, pinyin: Sìmíng Zhīlǐ, Japanese romanization: Shimei Chirei) (960–1028), also known as Siming Fazhi (四明法智), was a Chinese Buddhist scholar monk and key figure in the revival and development of the Tiantai School during the Northern Song dynasty. Revered as the seventeenth patriarch of Tiantai Buddhism, he was also posthumously titled Fazhi Dashi (法智大师), meaning "Master of Dharma Wisdom." His efforts defended and defined the orthodox philosophy of the Tiantai school, and shaped its doctrinal and ritual practices for generations. Zhili was also influential in fully integrating Pure Land Buddhism within the Tiantai school as well as for popularizing Pure Land Buddhist practice among laypersons.

== Life ==
Zhili was a native the city of Mingzhou (now Ningbo), in Zhejiang Province. This region (along with a specific mountain in it) was also called Siming, hence the moniker "Siming" Zhili. Zhili was born into the Jin 金 family and went by the style name Yueyan 約言. Following the loss of his mother at age seven, he entered the monastic order as a novice. By fifteen, he was fully ordained as a bhiksu and began to study the Vinaya. In 979, Zhili became a disciple of Baoyun Yitong, a Korean monk who became his most influential spiritual teacher. Zhili studied Tiantai with Yitong until the master's death in 988.

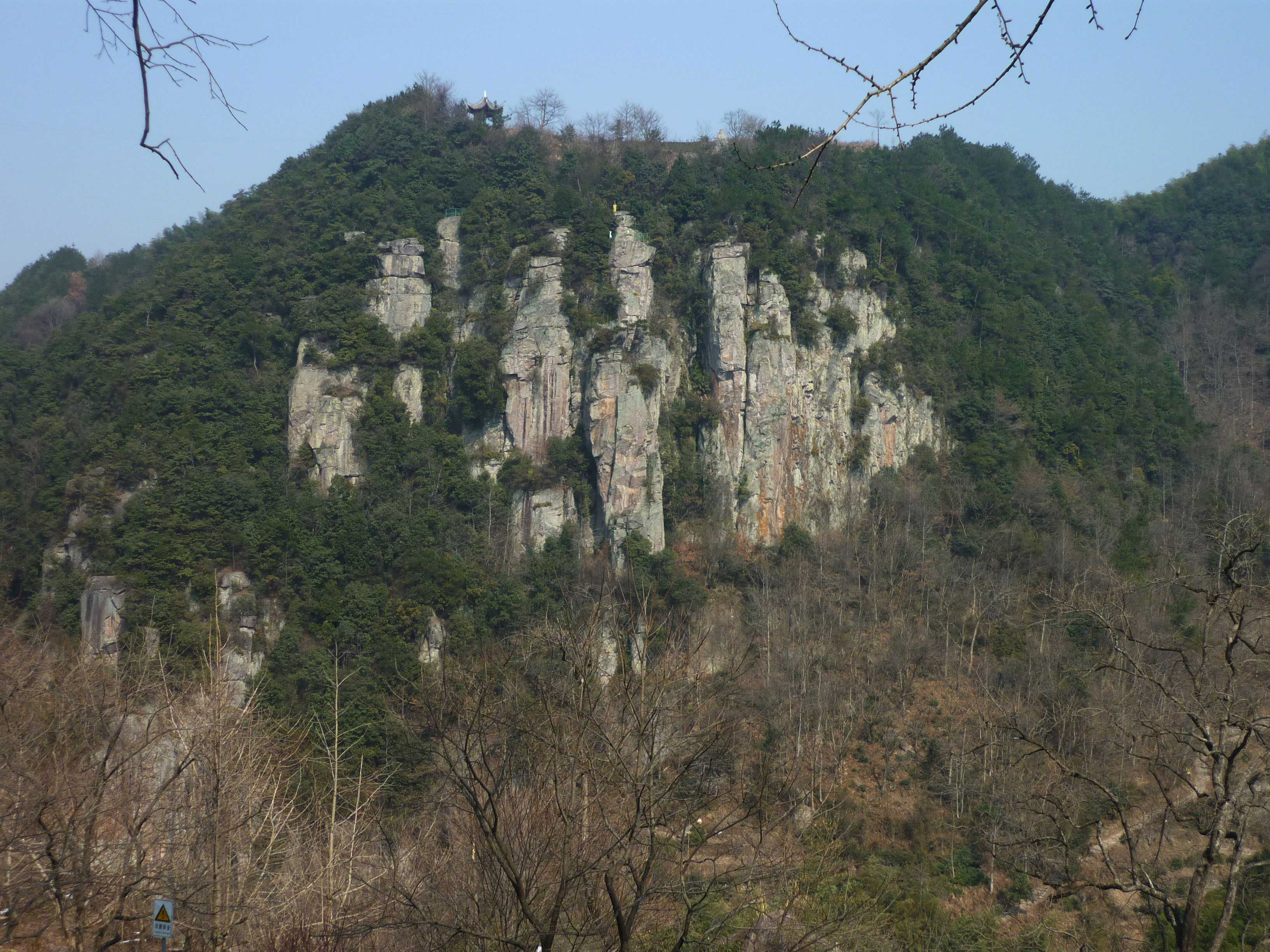
Danshan Stone Wall on Mount Siming (四明山)

In 995, Zhili settled at Bao'en Yuan (保恩院, later renamed Yanqing Yuan) on Mt. Siming (四明山), a "public" (shifang zhuchi) monastery which had been reserved for the Tiantai school by imperial decree. Zhili would remain for the rest of his life. Zhili and his co-abbot Yiwen worked to restore the dilapidated temple, making it into a key center for the Song Tiantai revival. He spent much of his time lecturing and performing Tiantai repentance rites as well as writing. Zhili's writings are deeply concerned with establishing and defending the orthodox Tiantai philosophy (which Zhili termed "home mountain") against other interpretations influenced by the Chan and Huayan schools that had begun to make their way within Tiantai circles (which Zhili derogatorily refers to as "off the [Tiantai] mountain"). His writings also defend Tiantai ritual practices like the Lotus Repentance ritual against interpretations of sudden enlightenment that could undermine such practices.

In 1003, the Japanese Tendai Pure Land scholar Genshin (942–1017) sent a disciple to China with a series of questions for Zhili. Zhili responded and his letters have survived. Zhili also reportedly read Genshin's Ōjōyōshū (Essentials of Birth in the Pure Land) and was deeply moved by it.

In his later years (from 1013 to 1028), Zhili's activities turned to working out Tiantai Pure Land doctrine and working to involve laypersons in Pure Land Buddhist societies. During this later period of his life he also promoted other gatherings, such as life release ceremonies and conferral of bodhisattva precepts to laypersons.

In 1017, Zhili took a vow to self-immolate after three years of practicing the Lotus Repentance in order to attain birth in the Pure Land. Zhili believed this practice generated great merit and also inspired others who witnessed this act of faith. This practice was also associated with attaining birth in the Pure Land through devotion to the Lotus Sutra (which mentions self-immolation and self-burning). Zhili engaged in a series of letters with the scholar-official and man of letters Yang Yi (974-1020), who sought to convince Zhili to abandon his suicide vow. After increasing pressure from several officials (and perhaps even imperial intervention), Zhili abandoned the plan and received further imperial recognition, including a purple robe and the honorific name Fazhi Dashi. After this event, Zhili did not abandon his desire for ascetic practice however, and practiced a Guanyin repentance rite for three years. He also burnt off three of his fingers as an offering.

In his later age, Zhili also completed his commentaries on Zhiyi's five minor works, which complemented Zhanran's commentaries to Zhiyi's three main works (Fahua xuanyi, Fahua wenju and Mohe Zhiguan). He also composed a repentance rite based around the Nīlakaṇṭha Dhāraṇī called the Dabei Chan (Chinese: 大悲懺; lit. 'Great Compassion Repentance'), which has remained one of the most popular and commonly performed rite in contemporary Chinese Buddhism.

While Zhili's teachings were not accepted by all Tiantai figures of his time, Zhili and his followers had a profound impact on the history of the Tiantai school since they soon came to dominate the tradition. Zhili's writings became a key source for the school's doctrinal orthodoxy, becoming part of the orthodox Tiantai canon later in the Song dynasty. Later Tiantai figures like Yueting Mingde (1531-1588) continued to rely on Zhili. Zhili's works, including commentaries on Zhiyi's texts such as Guanxin Erbai Wen (观心二百问) and Guanjingshu Miao Zong Chao (观经突妙宗钟), remain central to Tiantai and Tendai (Japanese Tiantai) scholarship today.

== Teachings ==
=== View of Tiantai's perfect teaching ===
Zhili’s career was defined by the controversy known as the "Home Mountain" (Shanjia, 山家) also known as the Siming faction, versus "Off Mountain" (Shanwai, 山外, also known as the Qiantang faction) debate. This debate centered on the interpretation of Tiantai doctrine. "Off Mountain" (i.e. "heterodox") proponents like Daochang Ningfen (754-828), Ciguang Wu'en (912-986), Yuanqing (源淸, ?–997), Zongyu, Qingzhao (963-1017) and Zhiyuan (976–1022), were influenced by Chan and Huayan thought. They emphasized doctrines like the "one pure mind" which is seen as an ultimate principle that gives rise to all phenomena. This doctrine, known as the "conditioned origination from the tathagatagarbha" (rulaizang yuanqi) or nature origination (xinqi), is derived from the Awakening of Faith and was developed in the works of Huayan masters like Chengguan and Zongmi.

This idea had already been incorporated to some degree in the writings of patriarch Zhanran and the interpretation of Zhanran became one key issue in the debate. Thus, some Song era Tiantai scholars defended and synthesized this Huayan idea with Tiantai teachings, seeing it as compatible with the Tiantai "perfect" or "round" (yuanjiao) view of ultimate reality. They also made it the focus of their contemplative teachings. Meanwhile, Zhili and his so called "Home Mountain" faction rejected the ultimacy of the nature origination view (xinqi), asserting that they were inferior to the original Tiantai teachings of Zhiyi which focuses on "nature inclusion" (xingju), and placing them lower in the Tiantai doctrinal hierarchy. This heated debate went on for some years as various figures from the opposing Qiantang faction wrote various works defending their position and Zhili and his disciple Renyue responded in kind.

Zhili's criticisms were particularly focused on the Huayan-Chan emphasis on the ultimate principle (理) and one mind (一心), exemplified in the writings of Guifeng Zongmi. According to this view, all phenomena (dharmas) are modes or aspects of the ultimate reality, Dharmakāya, like waves and water. This foundationalist model bases all reality on an ultimate pure awareness, the various phenomena are secondary and their specific forms are irrelevant. However, for Zhili and his Shanjia followers, the individual and specific existence of all phenomena are not secondary or derivative. Instead, as Ziporyn explains, "it is the nature of ultimate reality, not merely to assume any shape at all, but to be precisely these ten realms, these three thousand suchnesses. Buddhahood inherently includes all the other realms, all the other finite determinations in the universe." In other words, the ultimate reality is not some formless, and indeterminate basis for the world, instead it is the entire universe itself as a holistic truth. Likewise, phenomena are not mere illusions, but the ultimate itself.

Because of this, distinctions, determinations and individual phenomena are not just unreal delusions to be discarded or ignored. They do exist as part of the substance of the ultimate Dharmakaya, which differentiates itself through delusion and comes to know itself through enlightenment. As Zhili writes:

Our teaching makes clear that the substance with its three thousand dharmas follows various conditions to give rise to the Function (phenomena) with its three thousand dharmas. When it is not following these conditions, the three thousand are still there just the same. Thus the differentiated dharmas and the substance are not two, because even when delusion is eliminated, the distinctions remain.

Thus, for Zhili, every single individual phenomenon in the universe (each one of the three thousand dharmas) contains every other particular dharma, and so in each speck of dust is the totality of the universe. Also, because the individual contains the whole, each individual phenomenon is also the source of all other dharmas. As Ziporyn explains, from the point of view of any individual phenomenon or particle: "without this speck of dust, the absolute (which is itself three thousandness) would not be the absolute; part of what it is to be the absolute is to include this speck of dust, which has a particular place in the system of the three thousand dharmas. As such this dharma, even if it is an experience of a being in the lowest hell, can never be eliminated."

This view also entails that each phenomenon or dharma can become any other dharma because it has the inherent potential of all other phenomena within. This is what the Vimalakirti sutra means by "the defilements are the seeds of buddhahood". It is also the core idea of Zhili's understanding of "inherent evil" (xing e), which holds that buddha-nature encompasses both good and evil. For Zhili, both Buddha and evil being are already contained within each other's essence. In other words, there cannot be a totally pure ultimate nature that is without any evil or poison and the evil inherent in the ultimate principle cannot be totally eliminated (since it is not different from Buddhahood). In this view, the idea of a pure nature without inherent evil is a dualistic idea. From the ultimate perspective of the Tiantai perfect teaching however, defilement is enlightenment and vice versa, and the essence of enlightenment contains defilement and vice versa. According to Ziporyn, in this view the ultimate reality includes both the hell realms, buddhahood, all other realms, as well as the ultimate and provisional, in a single harmonious unity. Since every particular existent is an essential part of the ultimate reality, which is inherent in each individual thing, evil is inherent in buddha-nature just as everything else is. A Buddha is only a Buddha because they have realized their identity and non-duality with all realms of existence, including the hell realms. If he sought to cut himself off from other realms, he would not be a Buddha. As such, a Buddha cannot eliminate their inherent evil.

Therefore, according to Zhili, if one holds that buddha-nature does not include inherent evil, this is a dualistic view which does not understand the teaching of inherent inclusion (of all phenomena) and sees evil / the poisons as something outside the ultimate. However, if one understands the Tiantai view of identity which sees the entire Dharma Realm (the whole of existence) as inherently including the defilements, Zhili writes:

then the taint and delusion are dependent [on the buddha nature], and the poison and harm create nothing that was not already there. When one returns to the source, the taint and poison are still there as always. Only this perfects the meaning of identity...In the perfect teaching, since inherent evil has been explained, delusions of view and thought, large and small, are poisons which are identical to the [buddha] nature. This being the case, these poisons themselves are that which is capable of overcoming and destroying [poisons]. Since the poisons are what can destroy poisons, they can be absolute just as they are— where is there any differentiation between that which destroys and that which is destroyed, that which traces and that which is traced? Poison and harm are identical to the mean, all dharmas are reducible to harm, the awareness that negates it and posits it are mutually identical...

The practical upshot of this teaching is that in meditation we do not search or seek something outside of the defilements. Instead, one merely meditates on the deluded mind itself rather than meditating on some pure mind. By meditating on the deluded mind itself, one eventually comes to see that it implicitly contains within it the "three tracks" of dharmakaya, prajña and liberation. In their implicit form, these are none other than samsara, delusion and karma. Likewise, Zhili rejects the idea that we must contemplate only some pure ultimate mind and cut off the nine unenlightened realms since this is counter to the doctrine of the inclusion of all realms in every phenomenon.

Another important element of Zhili's metaphysical position is a rejection of the view that awareness is primary. Zhili considers any adoption of this idealistic trend which gives ontological priority to the mind to be a corruption of Tiantai thought. According to Zhili, mind has no special ontological status, mental phenomena are on the same ontological level as material phenomena, and as such they are not more real or foundational. As Ziporyn writes. Zhili "stressed the interrelation of form and mind (色心) and the mutual entailment of phenomena and principle (事理). Zhili's thought rejects any hierarchy between mind and matter and thus rejected the idealistic view of Huayan and Yogacara which sees mind as more primary than matter." As such, Zhili interprets any statements pointing to the primacy of mind in Zhiyi and Zhanran to be meditation techniques which are skillful because mind is what is easier to work with for a meditator. In this understanding, statements which say that "mind" is the source of all dharmas are true because the deluded mind gives rise to dharmas.

Furthermore, according to Zhili, Zongmi and the off-mountain faction errs in identifying buddha-nature and the ultimate source of all phenomena with an ultimate pure mind or "numinous awareness" (lingzhi). Off mountain scholars like Yuanqing had adopted this doctrine and identified it with the Tiantai teaching "three thousand realms in a single thought moment" (yinian sanqian). However, for Zhili, buddha-nature refers to the three truths (emptiness, provisional, and the middle). The unity and perfect harmony of the three truths means that none of them is more ultimate or foundational, all phenomena are inherently included in all others, and thus one cannot speak of any phenomenon as more important or basic. This also means that all phenomena contain the absolute and all are ultimate, not just awareness or pure mind. Thus, for Zhili, there is no ultimate unconditioned foundational mind, we only experience a conditioned mind, and this conditioned nature of our mind is precisely what makes it useful for contemplation of the ultimate reality, i.e. the three truths. For Zhili, the everyday deluded mind is precisely what is referred to as a "single thought" which contains all reality found in the classic Tiantai phrase "three thousand realms in a single thought moment".

Indeed, for Zhili, the off-mountain view influenced by Zongmi creates problems for the practice of Tiantai meditation precisely because it cuts off contemplation of relative phenomena in favor of an unconditioned "true awareness" that is beyond all thought and form. In Zongmi's way of teaching meditation (which was adopted by the off-mountain faction), any specific form or thought is nullified as a merely illusory appearance arising from the true mind (which is formless and indeterminate). As Ziporyn writes, in Zongmi's method "this absolute is equally accessible through any perception, and the procedure in any case is the same: to ignore the determination itself (see it as "no determination," "no mark") and reduce it to the markless mind. What particular thing it is simply does not matter." However, this Zen-like method is not compatible with the traditional Tiantai meditation methods (as taught in the Mohe Zhiguan), which rely on directing one's attention to specific types of phenomena (such as the aggregates, dhātus and sense fields), analyzing them and understanding them as part of the structure of the three truths. For Zhili, the initial object that one meditates on is the constantly changing and deluded sixth consciousness and its everyday thoughts. This object of meditation is directly accessible to all, even beginners, and yet due to nature inclusion, it includes all phenomena.

Zhili also criticized the Chan school's rejection of scriptural study and language, holding that these classic Mahayana sutra teachings were necessary for enlightenment. He saw the Chan slogan of "a special transmission outside the teaching, not depending on words and letters" as incompatible with the traditional Mahayana concept of upaya (skillful means) as taught in the Lotus Sutra. As Ziporyn writes "in traditional Tiantai, the truth to be realized itself includes both the means to its realization and the process of realization." For Zhili, the "perfect teaching" of the Lotus Sutra and Tiantai is seen as including and "opening up" all Buddhist skillful means, revealing the ultimate truth within the conventional. This means that the ultimate teaching contains all provisional teachings, just like Buddhahood contains all realms of existence. The ultimate teaching would not be the ultimate teaching if it did not include all provisional skillful means and so upayas can never be ignored or left behind (since they are inherent in the ultimate). This view is explained in Tiantai through the following Lotus Sutra quote: "The real ultimate mark of all dharmas is none other than provisional upaya and real ultimacy." Since this doctrine sees all skillful means as necessary and inseparable aspects of the ultimate truth and its very realization, Zhili saw all upaya as "intrinsic to the entity (of truth) itself (tinei fangbian)". Thus, in Zhili's classic Tiantai perspective, buddhahood contains an understanding of the whole Buddhist tradition of teachings and scriptures and how they all fit together in a harmonious whole. This "well rounded" teaching of Tiantai is in contrast to the Chan ideal of an enlightenment that is outside of scriptural study and other skillful means and practices, relying instead only on a "direct pointing."

In Zhili's doctrinal classification system (panjiao), the Chan teaching of Zongmi that he criticized is not completely rejected. Instead, it is seen as part of the special teaching (below the round or perfect teaching). As such, while he criticized this doctrine, Zhili still saw it as a legitimate Buddhist teaching (since it explains how conditioned reality arises from the ultimate), just one which was below the supreme teaching of Tiantai since it still contains a level of dualism (which separates the ultimate and the conventional truths).

His writings, such as the Shibuermen Zhi Yaochao (十不二门指要钟), were instrumental in defining authentic Tiantai doctrine and refuting Huayan-influenced interpretations. Over time, Zhili's "Home Mountain" perspective prevailed, becoming the orthodox interpretation of Tiantai teachings.

=== Inherent evil ===
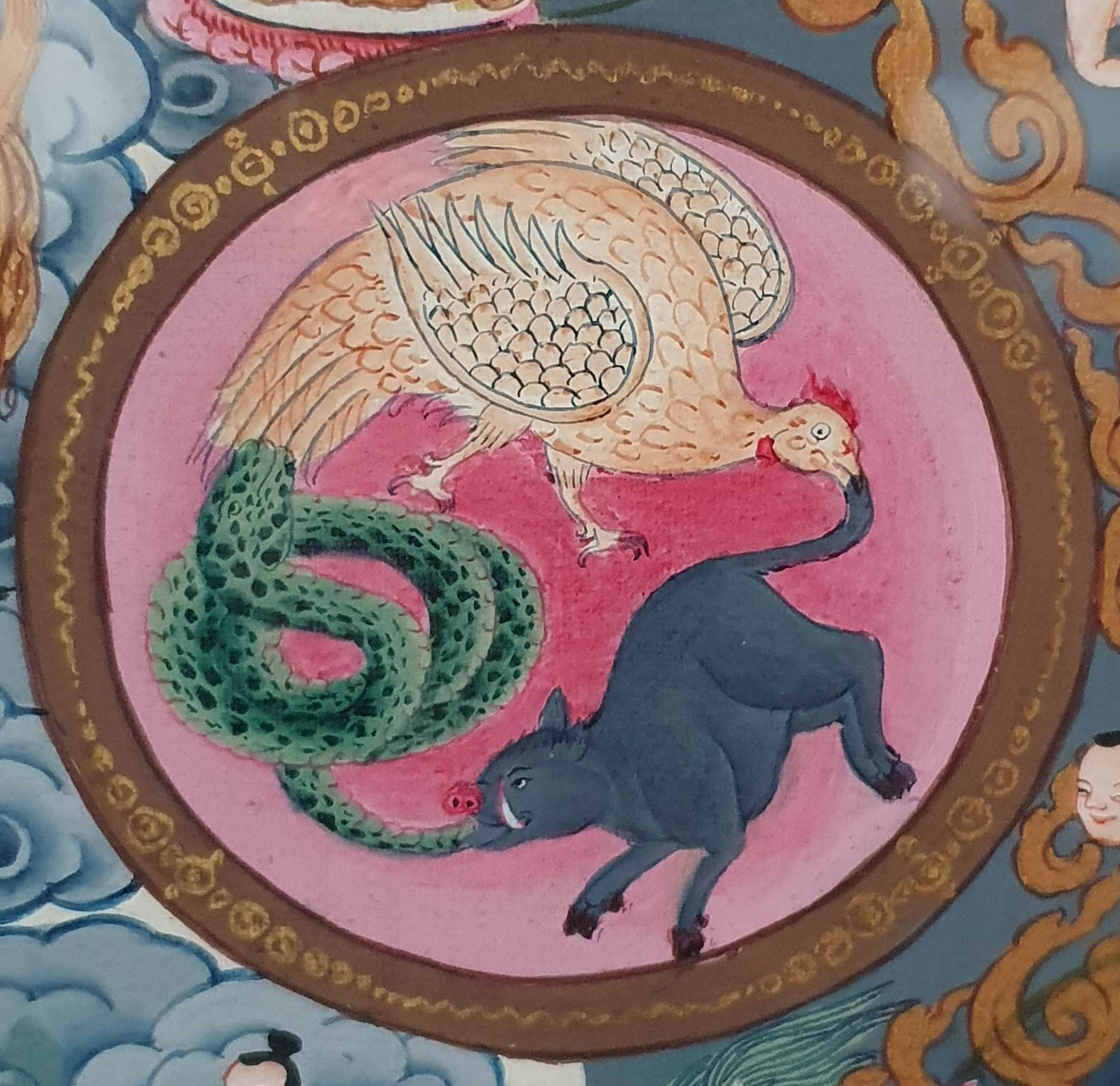
The three poisons (the essential afflictions) in Buddhism, are represented in the center of the wheel of life as a pig, a bird, and a snake.

For Zhili, a defining feature of the true Tiantai teaching was the doctrine of Nature including good and evil", also known as "inherent evil" (xing e 性惡). Building on the ideas of his predecessors, particularly Zhanran, Zhili asserted that due to the doctrine of mutual inclusion which holds each dharma (phenomenon) includes all others, ultimate reality also includes evil. He held that this doctrine was unique to Tiantai, distinguishing it from other schools like Huayan who did not understand this view. Thus, he writes:

Just this one single word—inclusion (ju 具)—clearly reveals [the doctrine of] our school. The masters of other schools also know that the Buddha-nature includes good, but none of them know that [Buddha-nature] as Conditioning Cause and as Revealing Cause also includes evil.

Thus, while other schools hold that only the one principle of Suchness is Buddha-nature, Tiantai holds that all ten realms are Buddha-nature and that therefore, the ultimate principle includes all the good and the evil of the ten realms, from Buddhahood to hell. Zhili's contribution to the doctrine of inherent evil is deeply intertwined with his philosophical framework, particularly his use of the concept of "identity" (ji 即). He also emphasized the identity of essence (nature) and function (practice). Unlike Huayan (and some Shanwai positions), which might separate the pure principle (essence) from differentiated phenomena arising from conditions (function), Zhili insisted that essence and function are mutually included in and ultimately identical to each other. For Zhili, the principle (essence) inherently includes the functions of all realms even when they do not compassionately adapt to the conditions and needs of beings (i.e. when it is an evil act). This differentiates the Tiantai view from the view that the ultimate principle is only the pure mind as Suchness, which may manifest as good and evil function, but does not include evil function. Thus, Zhili writes:

When [we] examine how the other schools explain identity, their position is untenable because they regard the fruit of Buddha as the only Suchness. They need to destroy all the differentiated nine realms in order to return to the one and only nature of the Buddha realm. … If all the Three Thousand Worlds are inherent virtues, then none of the nine realms need to be destroyed, they are identical to the Dharma of the Buddha [realm].

This emphasis on "identity" is central to Zhili's explanation of the Dharma-gate of Inherent Evil (xing e fa men 性惡法門) which is articulated by the maxim "cultivated evil is identical to inherent evil" (xiu e ji xing e 修惡即性惡). For Zhili, the Tiantai doctrine of "identity" means that the presence of cultivated evil (the afflictions and saṃsāra) are themselves the inherent evil of the ultimate principle. Therefore, afflictions and saṃsāra are themselves a part of the path and there is no need to eliminate them when entering the "Dharma-gate of inherent evil" unique to Tiantai:

Since afflictions and saṁsāra are cultivated evil, their whole present substance must be the Dharma-gate of inherent evil. Thus, there is no need to cut off and turn them over. The other schools do not understand inherent evil, so they reverse evil into good and cut off evil to reach good. Even those who claims to be of the utmost Sudden Teachings still say, "Inherently there is no evil [in the nature] and originally it is good." Since the whole [cultivated] evil can not be the [inherent] evil, their meaning of 'identity' is untenable.

This Dharma gate relies on realizing the true nature of our evil as it is in the present, and seeing it as identical to Buddha-nature and awakening, without having to stop it or to pursue good. To cut off defilements is to see nirvāna as outside of samsāra. But the Dharma gate of inherent evil seeks to see the non-dual unity of nirvāna and samsāra. Since inherent evil is understood to ultimately be no different from the true nature itself, sentient beings do not need to cut off cultivated evil but simply "return the cultivated evil to the inherent evil" to realize Buddha-nature. The way this is attained in practice is through the contemplation of mind (guan xin 觀心). Unlike Chan and Huayan which focus on contemplating the Pure True Mind, Zhili emphasizes that Tiantai relies on the "Contemplation of the Deluded Mind" (wang xin quan 妄心觀). He highlights the necessity of practicing by taking one's ordinary deluded mind as the object of contemplation, since this is the most accessible phenomenon. Through this practice, one can recognize the identity of the afflictions and Buddha-nature which is identical to the "poison of principle" which Zhiyi had described as "the undefiled itself is also defilement". Zhili thus criticized the Shanwai faction for arguing that the poison of principle is not identical to the ultimate principle, but that it was the ultimate principle combined with ignorance. Instead, Zhili argues that "since the poison is identical to the nature, the poison itself is that which has the ability to destroy [the poison]. Since the poison is that which can destroy poison, it is absolute in its present entity—then who can say that there is the destroyer and the destroyed."

Zhili used the idea of "inclusion" as the basis for asserting Tiantai's superiority as the supreme Round Teaching over other schools, including Huayan and Chan, and their related factions like Shanwai. He criticized these schools for not fully understanding "inclusion" and for promoting the idea of a pure True Mind that does not include evil, which he saw as dualistic or representing a lesser teaching. As Brook Ziporyn comment, for Zhili, "there has never been a time" when the ultimate principle or true essence was undefiled. Zhili engaged in tough debates to remove the influence of Huayan and Chan thought from Tiantai, powerfully insisting that inherent evil is part of Buddha-nature. His focus on "inherent evil" through the lens of "identity" created a distinct boundary between Tiantai's complete teaching and the understandings of other schools. His theory on the "poison of principle" further solidified this position and influenced later Tiantai thinkers.

=== Pure Land Buddhism ===
Zhili was a Pure Land devotee and he played a significant role in integrating Tiantai doctrine with Pure Land Buddhist practice, which focused on the recollection of Buddha Amitabha as a means of attaining birth in his pure land of Sukhavati. While previous figures had incorporated Pure land practice into Tiantai (including the founder Zhiyi), Getz writes that Zhili developed Tiantai Pure Land much further, providing a comprehensive Pure Land theory and placing Pure Land practice at the center of the Tiantai system.

Zhili's main theoretical exposition of Tiantai Pure land thought is found in his Commentary on the Subtle Doctrine of the Commentary on the Contemplation Sūtra (Guan-jing-shu Miao-zong-chao 觀經疏妙宗鈔). This is a sub-commentary to Zhiyi's commentary to the Amitāyus Contemplation Sūtra (modern scholars question its attribution to Zhiyi). Zhili's work explains the practice of the Pure Land contemplations as a way to access the ultimate principle taught in Tiantai doctrine and fully integrates Pure Land practice with Tiantai doctrine. His Pure Land writings focus on interpreting the Contemplation Sutra as a meditation text which belongs to the perfect teaching of Tiantai. According to Zhili, all sixteen meditations taught in the sutra are meditations on the absolute principle (liguan). This is in contrast to how the sutra was interpreted by other Tiantai masters like Zhiyuan, who argued that only the ninth contemplation was a meditation on the absolute principle, while the others were contemplations of the sensory phenomenal aspects of the pure land (shiguan).

Regarding the nature of the pure lands, Zhili's view was also unique, in that he rejected the common mind only idea, in which the pure land was a manifestation of the fundamental mind. However, Zhili also rejected the idea that Amitabha and his pure land existed as separate realities outside of any individual subject. For Zhili, the Buddha and the pure land are also inherent in sentient beings and in all phenomena, as their inherent enlightenment or buddha-nature (which is identical with the all-pervasive Dharmakāya) and it is precisely because of this that pure land practice is efficacious. When it comes to practice, this means that the meditations on the Buddha taught in the Contemplation Sutra are also a way of meditating on the mind (guanxin) and vice versa. According to Zhili's method of "meditating on Buddha by means of mind" (yuexin guanfo), the meditator contemplates Buddha Amitabha, his characteristics and pure land without seeing them as being outside the mind. However, this contemplation is not idealistic, since it does not claim that Amitabha and his pure land arise solely from mind (as Zhili rejects Huayan style idealism) or exist only in a subject's mind. Instead, this practice is based on the doctrine of the mutual inherence of all phenomena.

Furthermore, according to the off mountain interpretations, while the first three types of pure lands taught in Tiantai's system include form, the supreme kind of pure land, the Land of Eternal Quiescence and Light, was formless and without any characteristics. However, for Zhili, this view contradicts the teaching of mutual inclusion and thus he argued that the supreme pure land has form, and so does the Dharmakaya.

The practical side of Zhili's Pure Land Buddhism manifested in his extensive practice of Pure Land repentance rituals. Furthermore, Zhili, along with his contemporary Ciyun Zunshi (慈云尊师), also promoted lay Buddhist Pure Land practice by founding pure land lay societies. Zhili founded a pure land "lotus society" (lianshe) for laypersons and monks called nianfo hui which may have included ten thousand men and women and which focused on the simple practice of reciting the Buddha's name. The nianfo society was run by lay "assembly heads" who would be in charge of groups of 48 members and would issue nianfo calendars for keeping track of the recitation of the Buddha's name (the main practice taught in the society). Each member would sign up to recite the Buddha's name 1000 times per day, as well as for repenting of their transgressions and for reciting the bodhisattva vows. Yearly society meetings at Yanqing yuan temple would include the public announcement of the recitations and achievements of the members. They would also pass out the nianfo charts or calendars (nianfo tu) to the members, a feat which was completed using woodblock printing technology.

Zhili's society was one of the earliest such lay focused Pure Land societies, a phenomenon which become very popular during and after the Song dynasty. As such it served as a model for similar later Pure Land groups. The society also shows the growth in popularity achieved by Buddhism among the populace during the Song.

Zhili's Pure Land works reveal his strong attempt to align the Contemplation Sutra's meditative techniques with the Tiantai system of contemplation. Consequently, the Pure Land practice of reciting the nianfo and the visualization of Amitabha's Pure Land were de-emphasized in his system. Instead, Zhili stressed contemplation of the absolute principle and promoted meditation on the mind as the means to realize the Pure Land. He also rejected the idea that Pure Land should be understood as a literal place in space and time. Zhili's approach in these texts was clearly intended for practitioners of higher spiritual aptitude, as he did not address the traditional Pure Land concern of how ordinary beings might attain rebirth there. While some have interpreted Zhili's subcommentary as a correction to misunderstandings about Pure Land within his school, his perspective may also have stemmed from concerns arising from popular practices which deviated from classic Tiantai meditation and ritual teachings in favor simple recitation of nianfo.

=== Influence ===
This tension between the Tiantai contemplative model of Pure Land practice and the common practices embraced in Pure Land societies became evident in the debates that Zhili's subcommentary sparked throughout the Song period. In the eleventh century, figures such as Yu-yen (d. 1101) and Tse-ying (1055-1099), followers of Pen-ju, composed treatises that minimized Zhili's emphasis on contemplating the absolute principle. Instead, they stressed concrete practices such as nianfo recitation and visualizing Amitabha and his Pure Land. Although influenced by Tiantai doctrine, Yuanzhao, in his commentary on the Contemplation Sutra and other writings, strongly rejected Zhili's approach. He maintained that Pure Land practices and Tiantai meditation methods should remain distinct.

While Zhili's position faced significant opposition during the eleventh century, it experienced a revival in the twelfth century through figures like Tao-yin (1090-1167) and Tao-ch'en, who defended this contemplative emphasis while also acknowledging the value of concrete Pure Land practices. The issue of how these contrasting approaches could be reconciled within Tiantai remained unresolved. When Zongxiao inherited these debates toward the end of the twelfth century, he chose not to attempt a synthesis but instead presented materials from both perspectives in his anthology, the Compendium of the Land of Bliss. Zongxiao's decision to compile these differing viewpoints may reflect his recognition that Pure Land belief and practice could not be fully resolved in any one way.

== Works ==
Some of Zhili's key works include:

- Commentary on the Essentials of the Ten Gates of Non-Duality (Shibuermen zhi yaochao 十不二門指要鈔), the main work which criticizes the Huayan influenced "one mind" theories of the time.
- The Book of Ten Meanings (Shi yishu 十義書)
- Two Hundred Questions on Contemplating the Mind (Guanxin erbai wen 觀心二百問)
- Commentary on the Subtle Doctrine of the Commentary on the Contemplation Sūtra (Guanjingshumiao zong chao 觀經疏妙宗鈔)
- Record of Recovered Expositions on the Profound Meaning of the Golden Light Sūtra (Jinguangmingxuan yishi yiji 金光明玄義拾遺記)
- Record of the Sentences of the Golden Light Sūtra (Jinguangmingwen juji 金光明文句記)
- Record of the Profound Meaning of Guanyin (Guanyinxuan yiji 觀音玄義記)
- Record of the Commentary on the Meaning of Guanyin (Guanyinyi shuji 觀音義疏記)

== See also ==
- Zhiyi
- Zhanran
- Youxi Chuandeng
- Yuanzhao
- Dabei Chan

== Sources ==
- Chan, Chi-wah. “Chih-li (960–1028) and the Crisis of T’ien-t’ai Buddhism in the Early Sung.” In Buddhism in the Sung, ed. Peter N. Gregory and Daniel A. Getz, Jr. Honolulu: University of Hawaii Press, 1999.
- Getz, Daniel Aaron. Siming Zhili and Tiantai Pure Land In the Song Dynasty. PHD Dissertation, Yale University, 1994.
- Ma, Yungfen 楔㯠剔 (Shi Jianshu 慳夳㧆). 2011. The Revival of Tiantai Buddhism in the Late Ming: On the Thought of Youxi Chuandeng (1554- 1628). Ph.D. diss., Columbia University.
- Ziporyn, Brook. “Anti-Chan Polemics in Post-Tang Tiantai.” Journal of the International Association of Buddhist Studies 17, no. 1 (1994): 26–63.
- Ziporyn, Brook. Evil and/or/as the Good: Omnicentrism, Intersubjectivity, and Value Paradox in Tiantai Buddhist Thought. Cambridge, MA: Harvard University Press, 2000.
