= Daoxuan =

7th-century Chinese Buddhist monk and scholar

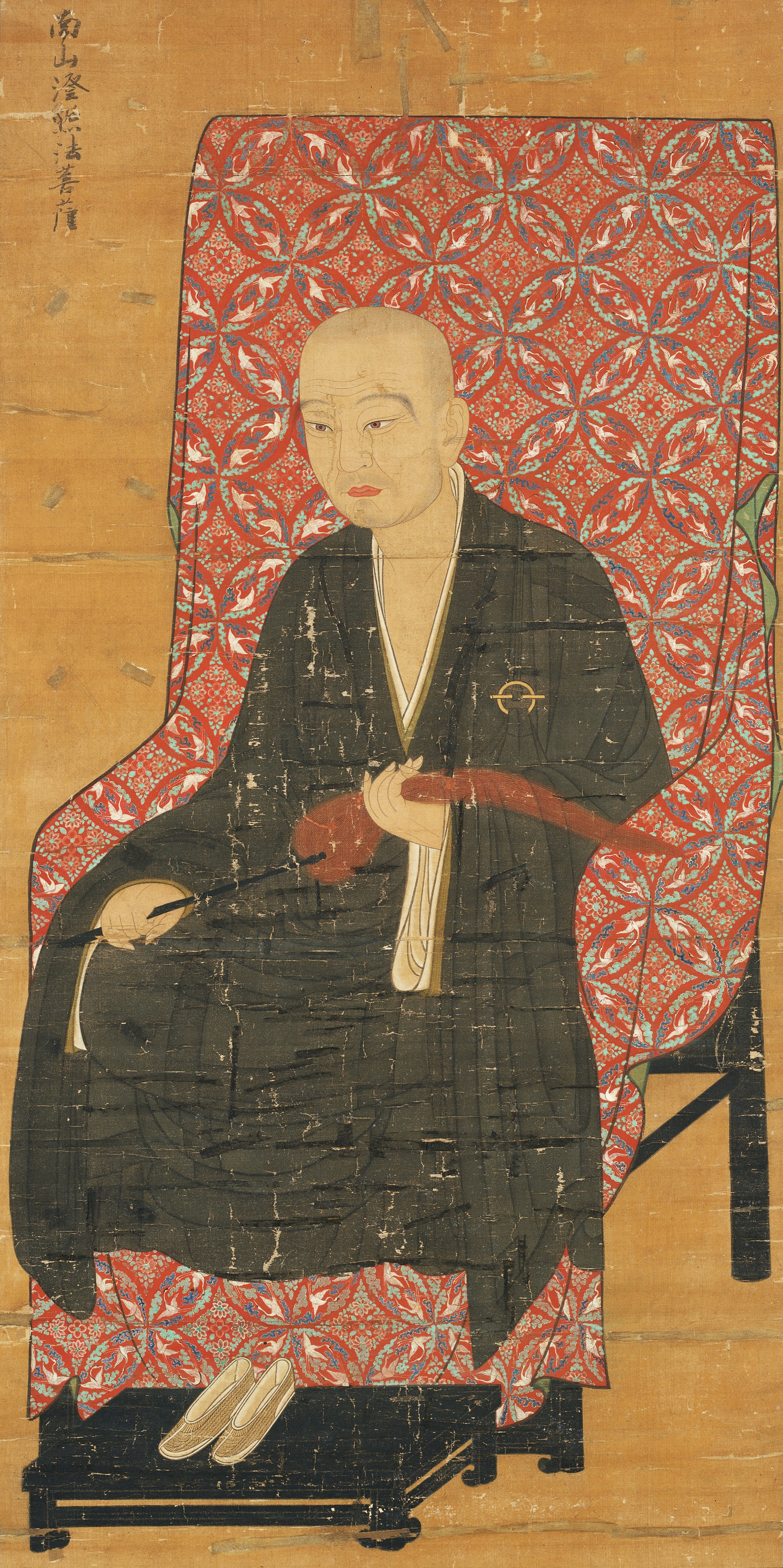
- Daoxuan (ICP) (Nara National Museum)

Personal life
- Born: 596 Chang'an, Shaanxi, China
- Died: 667 Chang'an, Shaanxi, China
- Parent: Qian Shen (Chinese: 錢申)

Religious life
- Religion: Buddhism
- School: East Asian Dharmaguptaka

Daoxuan (Chinese: 道宣; pinyin: Dàoxuān; Wade–Giles: Tao-hsüan; 596–667) was an eminent Tang dynasty Chinese Buddhist monk. He is perhaps best known as the Patriarch of the four-part Vinaya school (Chinese: 四分律宗). Daoxuan wrote both the Continued Biographies of Eminent Monks (Xù gāosēng zhuàn 續高僧傳) and the Standard Design for Buddhist Temple Construction. Legends retold in his biographies also associate him to a relic of the Buddha which came to be called Daoxuan's tooth (Daoxuan foya 道宣佛牙), one of the four tooth relics enshrined in the capital of Chang'an during the Tang dynasty. He is said to have received the relic from Nezha, a divinity associated with Indra.

Daoxuan wrote five commentaries on the four-part Vinaya known as the Five Great Works of Mount Zhongnan. He was also part of the translation team that assisted Xuanzang in translating sutras from Sanskrit into Chinese.

Daoxuan was an influential cataloguer. His catalogue of Buddhist scriptures, the Catalogue of the Inner Canon of the Great Tang (Datang neidian lu 大唐內典錄), aka Nèidiǎn Catalog (T2149) in 10 scrolls (juan 卷), was commissioned by the Emperor Gaozong and completed in 664. The Nèidiǎn Catalog helped to define the shape of the Chinese Buddhist Canon in future years. Influenced by the apocalyptic Mo-fa or theory of the end of the Dharma, Daoxuan was particularly concerned to expose and denounce suspicious (yiwei 疑偽) or fake (wei 偽) sutras. He even witnessed the wholesale burning of texts suspected of being fake. The Nèidiǎn Catalog is also notable for being the first bibliographical work to attribute the Heart Sutra to Xuanzang, who died in 664, the same year as the catalogue was completed.

Daoxuan is also noted for his admonishments to the Emperor Gaozong of the Tang for issuing an edict requiring that monastics bow before the emperor. His petition succeeded in the cancellation of that edict.

Daoxuan's work remained influential well into the Song. His work was important for the later Vinaya master Yuanzhao who revived the Vinaya School during the Song dynasty and wrote various commentaries on Daoxuan's key works.

== Early life ==
Daoxuan was born in 596, probably in the Sui capital of Daxing cheng 大興城, later renamed Chang'an (present-day Xi'an). He was born to the Qian 錢 family and his mother was of the Yao 姚 family, two prominent clans hailing from the region of the lower Yangtze river basin (Jiangnan). Daoxuan's origins differ depending on the sources. The Song Biography of Eminent Monks states that he was from either Dantu 丹徒 in present-day Jiangsu, or Changcheng 長城 in present-day Changxing district, Zhejiang. Scholarly consensus today seems to agree with the Kaiyuan shijiao lu 開元釋教錄, which states that his family hailed from Wuxing 吳興 in present-day Huzhou city, Zhejiang. A good argument has been made for his birth place being Jingzhao 京兆, also known as Chang'an, where his father probably emigrated in the 580s. According to the Song Biography of Eminent Monks, Daoxuan was of good stock: descendant of Qian Rang 錢讓 (89–151), Han dynasty Governor of Guangling 廣陵, and Qian Le 錢樂 (fl. 436), Grand Astrologer under Emperor Wen (424–453) of the Liu-Song. He was the son of Qian Shen 錢申, a high official at the Chen court acting as Director at the Ministry of Personnel (shangshu libu 尚書吏部). When the Sui took power, Daoxuan's family, alongside the families of many other Chen officials, were sent to the new capital in northwest China, a scene poignantly alluded to in the Ji shenzhou sanbao gantong lu 集神州三寶感通錄:

When the Sui had overcome the Chen, the entire kingdom's [Chen ruling elite], heads bared and hands bound, were moved west [to Daxing cheng (Chang'an)].

及隋滅陳，舉國露首，面縛西遷。

This move to the north most likely took place before he was born and he would have therefore grown up in Daxing cheng, not Wuxing. However, because his family came from the south, culturally Daoxuan remained a southerner. The difference between northerners and southerners would shape Daoxuan's who, according to Chen Huaiyu, put much stock in the cultural superiority of the south as he himself tried to develop Buddhism in the northern capital.

In Daoxuan's preface to his interview with the spirits, he wrote how from a young age he was interested in tales of the supernormal, recounting that:

When I was young, I delighted in learning many [different things] from those texts that draw out [examples of] rare and extraordinary [occurrences]. The Soushen [ji] investigates the supernormal, [and there are also] the Mingxiang [ji], the Mingbao [ji], the Jingyi [ji] the Shuyi [ji], tales of anomalies that record the unseen, [I] have read through them all.

余少樂多聞希世拔俗之典籍。故《搜神》研神，《冥祥》、《冥報》、《旌異》、《述異》，志怪錄幽，曾經閱之。

Zanning wrote that Daoxuan was intellectually precocious, reading broadly and capable of composing verse by the age of nine. This mark of genius indicates, if anything, that he was brought up in a wealthy family that had the means to invest in his education. At the age of fifteen, as Daoxuan showed a fondness for Buddhist teaching and an aversion to worldly matters, he joined the monastic order. Under the tutelage of Huiyun 慧頵 (564–637) at Riyan Monastery 日嚴寺, he began his practice and was, according to the Song Biography of Eminent Monks by Zanning, tonsured soon thereafter.

== Sources ==
- Attwood, Jayarava. (2019). "Xuanzang's Relationship to the Heart Sūtra in Light of the Fangshan Stele". Journal of Chinese Buddhist Studies. 32: 1–30.
- Buswell, Robert Jr; Lopez, Donald S. Jr., eds. (2013). Princeton Dictionary of Buddhism. Princeton, NJ: Princeton University Press. p. 215. ISBN 9780691157863.
- Jülch, Thomas, ed. (2016). The Middle Kingdom and the Dharma Wheel: Aspects of the Relationship Between the Buddhist Saṃgha and the State in Chinese History. Sinica Leidensia. Leiden and Boston: Brill Academic Publishers. ISBN 978-9004309654.
- Strong, J.S. (2007). Relics of the Buddha. Princeton University Press. ISBN 978-0-691-11764-5.
- Tokuno, Kyoko (1990). "The Evaluation of Indigenous Scriptures in Chinese Buddhist Bibliographical Catalogues". In Buswell, Robert E (ed.). Chinese Buddhist Apocrypha. University of Hawaii Press. pp. 31–74.
- Wong, Dorothy (2018). Buddhist Pilgrim-Monks as Agents of Cultural and Artistic Transmission: The International Buddhist Art Style in East Asia, ca. 645-770. Singapore: NUS Press National University of Singapore. ISBN 978-9814722599.
