= Standard Design for Buddhist Temple Construction =

Chinese language text written by Daoxuan

Standard Design for Buddhist Temple Construction is a Chinese language text written by Daoxuan in the early Tang dynasty. It described a design for Buddhist temples influenced by mainstream Chinese architecture, and based upon a traditional layout composed of multiple, related courtyards. This architectural tradition can be traced back to the Shang and Zhou dynasties.
