= Wang Rixiu =

Song dynasty Buddhist lay scholar

Wang Rixiu

Wáng Rìxiū (王日休; d. 1173 CE), also known as Layman Longshu (Longshu jushi 龍舒居士), was a prominent Buddhist layman and scholar-official in the Southern Song known for his writings on Pure Land Buddhism. Longshu's Pure Land Essays (龍舒淨土文, Lóngshū Jìngtǔ Wén) is one of the most prominent pre-modern Pure Land writings by a lay Buddhist scholar. Its teachings and stories became a model for lay Buddhism during the Ming dynasty, and it even influenced Japanese Pure Land Buddhism.

== Life ==
Wang Rixiu was a native of Longshu (in present-day Shucheng County, Anhui Province). A contemporary of the great Confucian philosopher Zhu Xi (1130-1200), Wang received a traditional Confucian education and was eventually recommended for the National University's jinshi award during the reign of Emperor Gaozong of the Southern Song. However, Wang did not take up the official government position he was initially offered after passing the examinations, and remained focused on his studies. During his scholarly career, he wrote commentaries on the Six Chinese Classics (especially excelling in the study of the Spring and Autumn Annals), the Analects, the Mencius, and the Laozi and Zhuangzi and taught students on these topics.

At some point in the early 1160s, Wang (now 60) converted to Pure Land Buddhism, proclaiming “This [study of the Confucian classics] is karma-generating behavior and not the ultimate teaching. I will turn to the Western Realm (Pure Land)”. After his conversion, he lived an austere life as a layman, wearing common clothing, eating vegetarian meals, and making it his daily practice to bow one thousand times before the Buddha. During his Buddhist period, he completed his editing of the Great Amitābha Sūtra (completed in 1162), which is a collation of four translations of the Larger Sukhāvatīvyūha. The Pure Land Essays were also published in 1162. Wang's Great Amitābha Sūtra was included in the Daming Southern Canon, the Daming Northern Canon, and the Qing Canon, enjoying broad support.

Wang also eventually renounced his official government post as a scholar-official. Hayashida Kojun theorizes that the imperial government's policy of honoring Daoism and Confucianism while suppressing Buddhism, as well as Wang's desire to focus on his faith, led to the resignation.

In 1173 CE, Wang passed away in Luling (present-day Ji'an), Jiangxi. According to contemporary accounts, Wang passed away in the middle of the night while chanting sutras and bowing in worship. At one point he suddenly exclaimed several times, "Amitābha has come to receive me!" and then passed away while standing. He was sixty nine.

== Longshu's Pure Land Essays ==
Longshu's Pure Land Essays (龍舒淨土文; Lóngshū Jìngtǔ Wén) in ten fascicles, is Wang Rixiu's most important work. It currently survives under the longer title Longshu's Augmented Pure Land Essays (龍舒增廣淨土文; Lóngshū Zēngguǎng Jìngtǔ Wén; T.1970), which contains two additional fascicles with supplementary material. It is a text written in an accessible straight-forward style meant for a broad audience. The work was an instant classic. It was widely printed, achieving a wide audience within a few decades. This is evinced by Zongxiao’s Lebang wenlei, published just shortly after Wang's death, which states that Longshu's treatise "is widely disseminated throughout the empire, and, among those practicing Pure Land, there is no one who has not read it." According to Getz, the Pure Land Essays is "a comprehensive, synthetic, popular treatise on Pure Land that had multiple aims: to persuade nonbelievers, to confirm believers in their faith, to explain Pure Land teaching, to set forth a program for practice, and to entreat practitioners of Pure Land to spread the Pure Land message."

The core of the text is organized into ten main topics, each one of which takes up one fascicle. The themes of each of the ten central fascicles are:

1. The origin of faith
2. A survey of the Pure Land doctrine
3. Encouragement to practice
4. An explanation of how to practice.
5. Biographies of thirty exemplary monastic and lay Pure Land practitioners
6. A discussion of thirty-seven different types of people and occupations, along with recommendations on how to practice in each specific life circumstance
7. A discussion for Chan practitioners
8. Pure Land stories showing the efficacy of the practice
9. Explains how someone can attain the highest level of rebirth
10. Explains how Pure Land Buddhism is related to the highest Buddhist truths

While ostensibly a traditional Pure Land text, the Essays exhibit the moral values and sensibilities of Confucianism, as can be seen in the introduction of the text which states:

Pure Land teaching is mostly manifested in daily practice, while its residual merit is manifest after this lifetime. The ignorant simply regard this teaching merely as an affair of the afterlife. They are entirely unaware that Pure Land teaching is of great benefit in the present life. How is this the case? It is because the Buddha’s purpose in teaching people was nothing other than the promotion of goodness. How then is this different from the goal of Confucianism in teaching people? It differs only in name. Therefore, for those whose minds are set on Pure Land, what is manifest in their daily practice—the thoughts of the mind, the words of the mouth, and the actions of the body—is nothing other than goodness. Achieving goodness, they become superior men (junzi) and great worthies (daxian). In the present lifetime people will respect them, the gods will protect them, good fortune and status will increase, and the length of their years will be extended. Therefore, who can say that there is no benefit in this life for those who follow the Buddha’s words and set their minds on Pure Land?

The treatise thus merges the Pure Land Buddhist concerns of gaining birth in the Pure Land and becoming a buddha with the Confucian concerns for ethical relationships and societal harmony.

While earlier Pure Land texts like the Lebang Wenlei had focused on the Pure Land practice and attainments of elite monastic practitioners, Longshu's essays discuss all sorts of people in various conditions, showing that all can attain birth in the Pure Land, the wealthy and the poor, the learned and the uneducated, even those with occupations considered immoral in Buddhism (fishermen, wine sellers, etc).

While his teachings promote traditional Buddhist practices of non-harming of all beings (including animals) and Buddhist vegetarianism, he also tailors his advice to individual conditions and forms of livelihood. For example, Longshu writes that since farming unavoidably involves harming tiny creatures, farmers should try to avoid as much unnecessary death as possible, repent of the harm caused, constantly recite Amitābha's name, and make a vow to liberate all the small beings one has harmed in this life once one has attained Buddhahood. He writes:

Farmers should reflect on themselves, saying, “Despite the fact that farming is the foundation of all occupations, I have nevertheless killed and harmed the lives of numerous minute beings through plowing and planting.” Although this could not be helped, you should attempt to protect all beings to the degree that you are able, repent past misdeeds, constantly recite “Amituo Fo,” and make a great vow, announcing, “After I have seen the Buddha and attained the Way, may I first save all the minute sentient beings whose lives I have taken since engaging in plowing and planting. Next, may I save all the sentient beings, both hated and loved.” Frequently producing this thought, perform recitation upon recitation without cease. When your recitations naturally come to maturation, you will with certainty be reborn in the Realm of Highest Bliss. If you turn to converting others, making them entreat and convert each other, you will obtain karmic recompense in this life, and in the next you will be born in the highest level of the middle grade of pure land.

Wang offers similar instructions to other occupations involving killing, like fishermen.

Furthermore, drawing on Confucian morality, Wang does not ask people to abandon the occupations which are necessary for the functioning of society. Instead, Wang recommends repentance and nianfo practice (reciting the Buddha's name), as well as generating the vow that all the sentient beings one has previously killed may attain rebirth in the Pure Land. This teaching made Pure Land practice highly accessible to commoners and lower classes.

Wang's essays also address Buddhist monks and meditation (chan) practitioners. His writings emphasize the difficulty of attaining enlightenment through one's own effort in Zen meditation, noting that "escaping saṃsāra is achieved by only two or three out of a hundred, and even then, Buddhahood remains extremely distant." Wang thus held that the number of people who can attain awakening on their own is extremely small. Because of this, everyone should do some Pure Land practice, so they could be born in the Pure Land after death, where Buddhahood is assured.

Regarding the elite literati class, Wang warns that since such a status is transient, they should not become attached to it, but seek birth in the Pure Land:

Among the literati there are those who do not study in any depth but then earn a high degree. There are also those who study in depth, but in the end they are not recommended for office. Since the merit they planted in former lives differs, should not the outcome also differ? Although the reward of fortune may allow one to earn a degree in one’s youth, attain eminence, and achieve great things for a while, it lasts for a while and then expires...Of the extremely high ranking men since ancient times, who is still alive? Better to steal a moment of idleness amidst the bustle. Every morning practice the way of the Western Region when you have a brief period of free time. In this life you can eliminate calamity and accumulate karma. Upon death you will entrust your life to a lotus blossom.
