= Fazhao =

Chinese Pure Land Buddhist patriarch

Fazhao (Chinese: 法照; pinyin: Fǎzhào, J. Hōshō; 746–838), also known as Zhulin Fazhao (竹林法照) and Śramaṇa Fazhao of Nanyue, was a Chinese monk during the Tang dynasty, known for his teachings on Pure Land Buddhism and nianfo (recitation of Buddha Amitābha's name). He was honored by Chinese emperor Daizong with the title "National Teacher of the Bamboo Grove temple of the Central Terrace [of the Wutai Mountains]" and was later honored as a patriarch of the Pure Land tradition in China.

== Life ==
Master Fazhao was born in present-day Dadang Village in Yang County, Hanzhong, Shaanxi Province, to a secular family with the surname Zhang. In his youth, he traveled to Jiangnan, where he became interested in the teachings of Huiyuan (334–416) at Mount Lu. Upon arriving at Mount Lu, he established a center for Amitābha Pure Land practice.

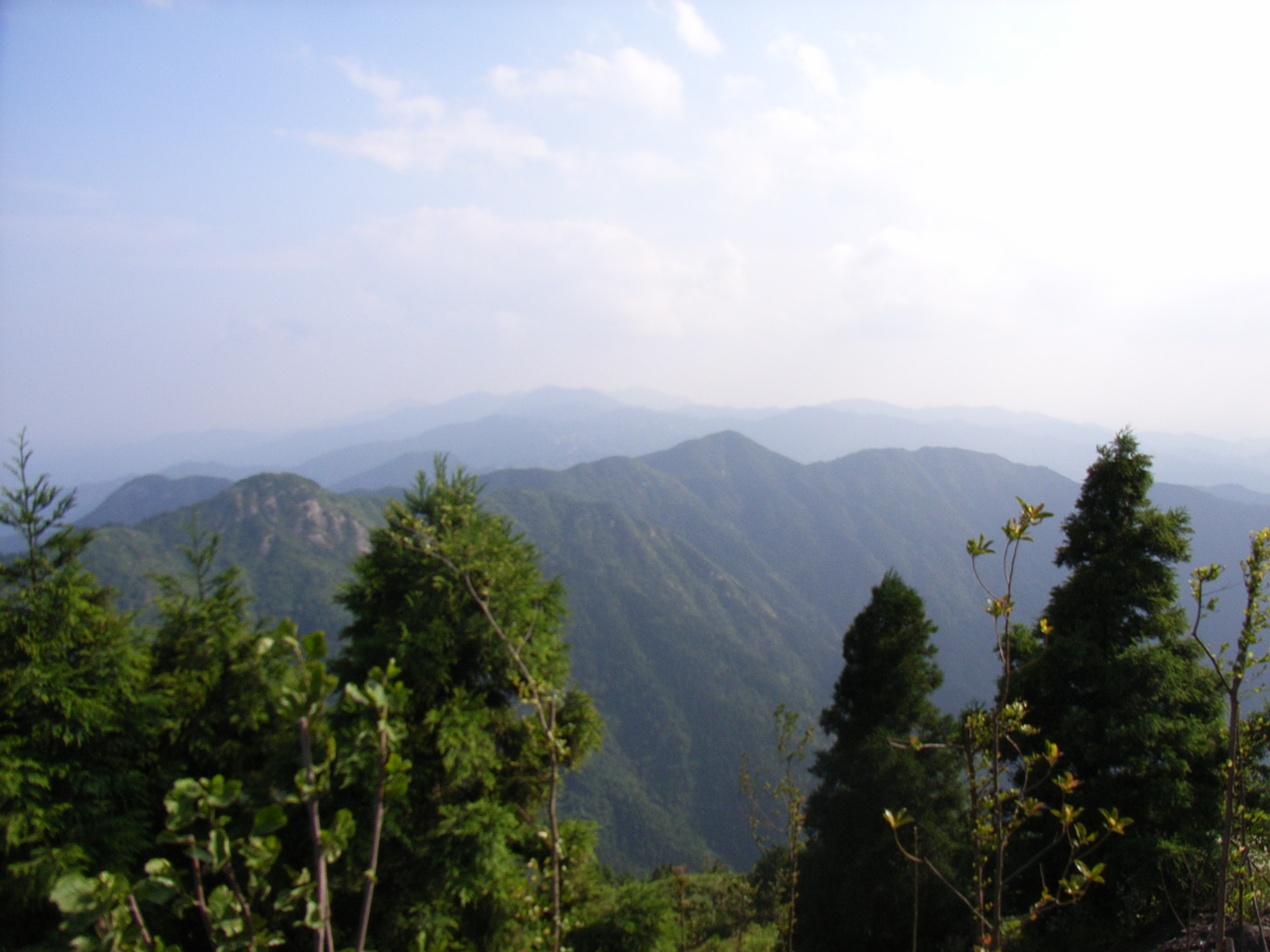
Hengshan Mountains

In 765, Master Fazhao left Mount Lu and became a disciple of the renowned Pure Land monk Chengyuan(承遠） (712–802). According to the Nanyue Mituo si Chengyuan Heshang bei (Stele of the Mituo Temple at Nanyue), Master Fazhao had a vision during meditation. He saw himself before Amitābha Buddha, alongside an elderly monk identified as Chengyuan, who instructed him to convey a message to his former homeland. This experience profoundly affected Master Fazhao, leading him to Mount Heng (Hunan), where the vision's scenery matched his meditative insight. Moved by the realization, he accepted Chengyuan as his spiritual mentor and aspired to become his successor.

In 766, while at Mount Heng of Nanyue (南岳衡山), Master Fazhao is said to have received a new method of nianfo chanting directly from Amitabha Buddha. A Dunhuang manuscript (P.2066) records that he spent ninety days each summer engaged in pratyutpanna nianfo practice. During one such practice session, he witnessed a golden bridge extending to Sukhāvatī, where he encountered Amitābha. The Buddha smiled and entrusted Master Fazhao with a profound Dharma teaching, instructing him to disseminate the five tempo nianfo method across the world to benefit countless beings. This marked Master Fazhao’s second major spiritual experience, reinforcing the sacred nature of nianfo as a universal practice in the western Pure Land.

In 767, Master Fazhao experienced a third significant vision while eating porridge at Yunfeng Monastery in Hengzhou. In his bowl, he perceived an unfamiliar landscape of a mountain temple called the Bamboo Grove Temple. Upon inquiry, the monks Jiayan （嘉延）and Tanhui （曇暉） identified the vision as being one of the Wutai Mountains. Inspired, Master Fazhao embarked on a pilgrimage to Mount Wutai in 769, arriving there in 770.

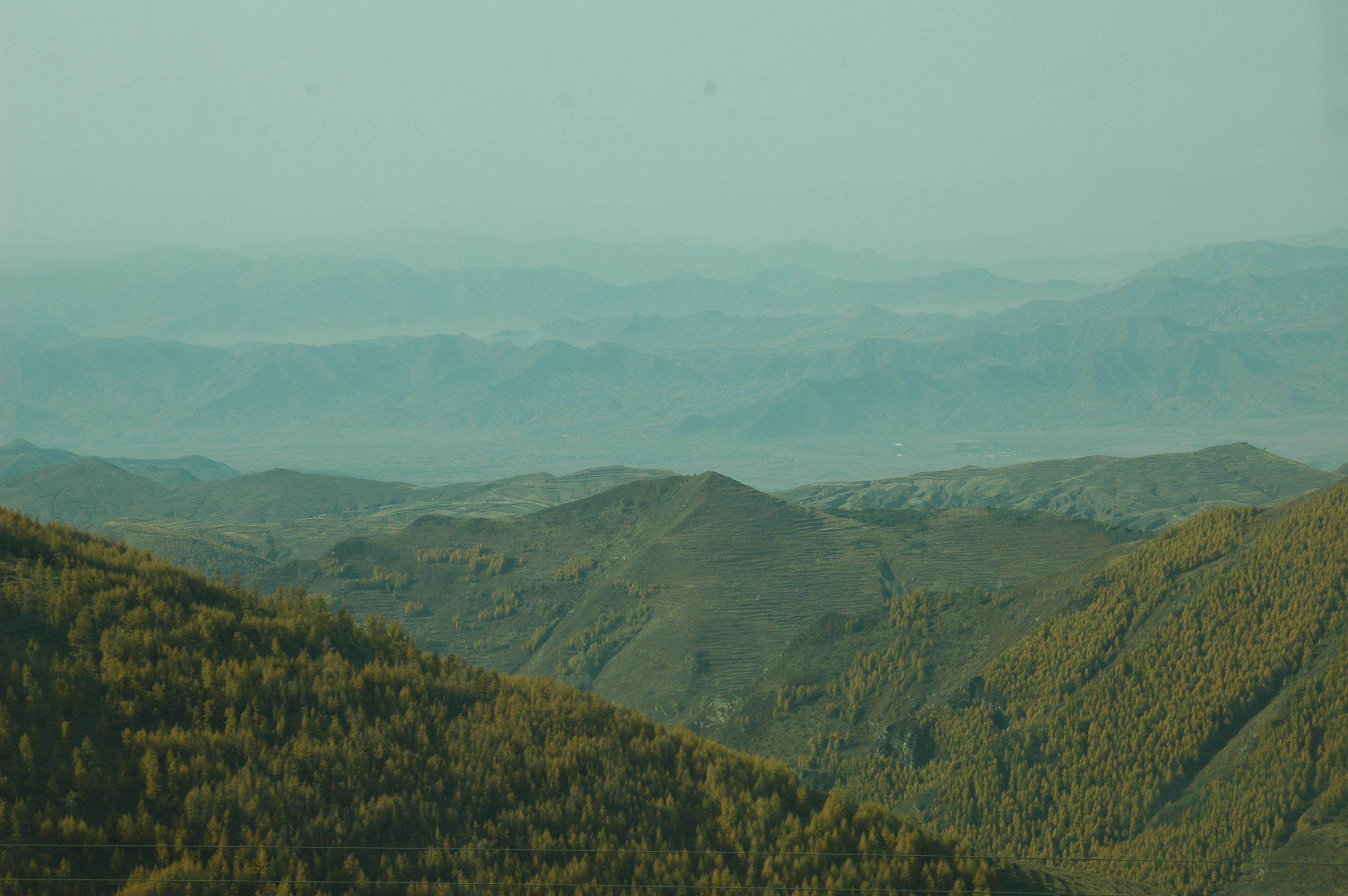
Panorama of the Wutai range

While on Mt. Wutai, Master Fazhao had visions of Mañjuśrī bodhisattva and Samantabhadra bodhisattva who confirmed his practice of nianfo and guided him on the path. According to the Guang Qingliang zhuan 廣清涼傳 (Extended Chronicle of Mount Clear and Cool [Mountain]) records, Mañjuśrī said the following the Fazhao:

As to your nianfo practice, at the present time among various practices there is nothing surpassing nianfo. … all dharmas and prajñāpāramitā, the manifestation of deep dhyāna (meditation) and the unexcelled awakening of buddhas all are produced from nianfo. Thus know that nianfo is the king of dharmas. You all should constantly recite the king of unexcelled dharmas and let yourselves not rest.

The Guang Qingliang zhuan also states that Master Fazhao created a stone stele of this revelation and also wrote it on his monastery's wall.

On Mount Wutai, Master Fazhao also led the construction of Zhulinsi (竹林寺, Bamboo Grove) monastery. He also became known as Wuhui Fashi, or “Dharma Master Five-Tempo”. Fazhao's teaching was deeply respected by the emperors Daizong and Dezong, both of whom invited him to teach at court, the first time Pure Land teaching was introduced to the imperial court. Fazhao was even granted the ‘national teacher’ (guoshi 國師) title by Emperor Daizong 代宗 (r. 762–779), indicating his popularity among the elites. He was the first Pure Land master to receive this title.

Master Fazhao's work significantly contributed to the mainstream acceptance and propagation of the Pure Land Buddhism during the Tang dynasty.

== Teaching ==
Master Fazhao's teaching is considered by modern scholars to be a fusion of the three main Pure Land lineages of China at the time, those of Huiyuan, Shandao and Cimin Huiri.

=== Nianfo (Buddha Recitation) ===
Like previous Pure Land masters, Master Fazhao emphasized the practice of nianfo (recollection of the Buddha, mindfulness of the Buddha) as the supreme practice. In his Ritual Manual he writes:

In accordance with the temperaments of the sentient beings, the Tathāgata establishes whether the teaching is profound or brief, all leading them to reality. And for the people who have attained such a true stage of the unborn, nobody can compare with them. Indeed, the meditative absorption of buddha recollection (nianfo samadhi, 念佛三昧) is the true, unsurpassable, profound, and marvelous meditation gate. Based on forty-eight vows and reciting the name Amitābha, the King of the Dharma conducts the Buddha-work and vows to save sentient beings...The Mahāvaipulya Buddhāvataṃsaka Sūtra states: “For Bodhisattvas, even all Buddhas, they must rely on the remembrance of the Buddha, Dharma, and Sangha to attain the three virtuous states and the supreme perfect enlightenment respectively.”

Master Fazhao developed a new and unique method of devotional practice known as the “five-tempo recitation of the Buddha’s name” (Wuhui Nianfo 五會念佛). This is Master Fazhao's main contribution to the Pure Land tradition. It is a method of chanting the Buddha's name which uses five different tempos and tones (of the Chinese pentatonic scale) to inspire faith and achieve the nianfo samādhi (nianfo sanmei). The Jingtu wuhui nianfo lüe fashi yizan describes these five ways of reciting the Buddha's name as follows:

First, recite ‘Namo Amituofo’ (Nanwu emituo fo 南無阿彌陀佛) on a single pitch in a slow tempo, second, recite ‘Namo Amituofo’ with a rising (or higher) pitch at a slow tempo, third recite ‘Namo Amituofo’ at a tempo neither fast nor slow, fourth recite ‘Namo Amituofo’ at a gradually in- creasing tempo, and fifth recite the four syllables ‘Amituofo’ quickly while walking.

In 767, while demonstrating the practice of the five ways of reciting nianfo at Yunfengsi monastery, it is said that miraculous events occurred, including the appearance of Amitābha in the clouds. These events reportedly drew the attention of Emperor Daizong (r. 762–779), who invited Master Fazhao to the imperial palace. Master Fazhao was also known for standardizing the Chinese nianfo phrase into the now common na-mo a-mi-tuo fo ("adoration [or prostration] to Amitabha Buddha').

Master Fazhao's chant style was extremely influential, not just on Wutai mountain's traditions, but on East Asian Buddhist music and chanting in general. It was first adopted by monasteries in the capital of Chang'an, and later taught at national temples throughout the nation. Fazhao's influenced also reached Japan through the Tendai school. One of the early Tendai masters, Ennin, studied Master Fazhao's five tone nianfo during his trip to China and Mt. Wutai.

=== Master Fazhao and other traditions ===
Beyond promoting Pure Land Buddhism, Master Fazhao also integrated Pure Land teachings with Chinese Buddhist ideas of the Tiantai, Chan, and Huayan schools, thereby aligning Pure Land beliefs with the broader intellectual currents of Chinese Buddhism at the time. His efforts in spreading Pure Land teachings earned him the title “latter-day Shandao” (善導後身) among his contemporaries. Fazhao's residence in the Wutai mountains coincided with that of Chan master Baotang Wuzhu and also the Huayan master Chengguan. There is evidence that Wuzhu and Fazhao were colleagues. Fazhao's teaching may also have been influenced by Zhanran's Tiantai lineage.

Master Fazhao's teaching criticizes the radical Chan of Shenhui's southern school, as Cimin Huiri does, for their rejection of classic Buddhist practices like reciting sutras, buddha contemplation, nianfo, and cultivating good deeds. However, he also taught that meditation on the Buddha could lead to the formless realization (literally: non-recollection, 無念) of the Dharma nature that the Chan schools were seeking, which is not outside our own heart-mind. Thus, Fazhao writes:

Those who wholeheartedly contemplate the Buddha, will be able to enter deep meditation. Sitting with an upright mind during the first watch of the night. the West (Sukhāvatī) will appear before the meditator. Contemplate the Buddha without any object of contemplation, this is the thusness. If one realizes this meaning, it is called the pearl of the Dharma-nature. The Pure Land is in our minds, but the foolish seek it from outside. The precious mirror is in the mind, if one does not realize it, one will lead a futile life. Buddhas are within our minds, it is you who does not seek it by yourself. Do not waste any time, practice with diligence and seek it within.

Some scholars have argued that the idea of non-recollection was influenced by Chan masters like Master Kim (Wuxiang 無相 no mark). Fazhao's texts also mention sitting meditation as an important element of his overall Pure Land method. For example, his large Ritual Manual states: "With constant sitting meditation, chanting sūtras, and reciting the name of the Buddha, one will certainly attain the realization and enlightenment”. In one of his hymns, Fazhao also states that Chan meditation and nianfo practice have the same ultimate intent:

There is nonduality in the Tathāgata’s teachings, but sentient beings always have discrimination. Practicing meditation with an aim to purify the mind, reciting the name of the Buddha with a wish to welcome the Buddha with a transformation body. One is like traveling on a mountain with a vehicle, the other is like traveling in a river with a boat. Mountains high and rivers low are different in height, but the merits and principles in achievement are exactly the same.

== Major Works by Master Fazhao ==
At least two of Fazhao's works have survived:

- Jìngtǔ wǔhuì niànfó sòngjīng guānxíng yí (淨土五會念佛誦經觀行儀 , T85), English: Ritual Manual of the Five-Tempo Intonation of the Name of the Buddha for Recitation of Scripture and Contemplation of Pure Land
- Jìngtǔ wǔhuì niànfó lüè fǎshì yízàn (淨土五會念佛略法事儀讚, T47), English: Hymn for the Abridged Ritual Manual of the Five-Tempo Intonation of the Name of the Buddha for Pure Land Dharma Ceremony, which is an abridged edition of the latter manual for shorter ceremonies.

These works focus on devotional practice are heavily influenced by the works of Shandao. Together, these texts contain seventy two different hymns by different authors (18 are by Master Fazhao) to be chanted, along with numerous ritual instructions and clarification of various doubts about the chanting practice.

While the focus of these works is the vocal recitation of the Buddha's name and other praises, they also discuss Buddha contemplation (guanfo), the practice of meditative visualization of the Buddha Amitabha.

== See also ==
- Buddhism in China
- Wulong Shaokang
- Shandao
- Ennin
- Chengyuan
