= Cimin Huiri =

8th-century Pure Land Buddhist monk

Cimin Huiri (Chinese: 慈悞慧日, pinyin: Címǐn Huìrì; Japanese: Jimin Enichi, c. 680–748) was a figure in Chinese Pure Land Buddhism and the founder of the Cimin lineage within this tradition. Born in 680 during the Tang dynasty, Huiri emerged as one of the most influential defenders of the Pure Land School against the critiques of the Southern school of Chan Buddhism.

== Overview ==
=== Life ===
Inspired by the pilgrimage of the translator Yijing (意靖; 635–713), Huiri embarked on a journey to India in 702. Traveling by sea, he reached the Indian subcontinent in 704 and remained there until 719 (a pilgrimage that was a year longer than Xuanzang's).

During his stay, he visited numerous Buddhist holy sites and studied with Indian teachers and followers of Amitabha Buddha. He was deeply engaged in devotion to the Buddha and to the Bodhisattvas. On his journey back to China, he entered a mountain retreat in Gandhara, fasting and praying to Guanyin. He then had a vision of the Bodhisattva, who personally instructed him in the Pure Land path.

Cimin returned to China in 719, bringing with him Buddhist scriptures and Buddha images. Upon his arrival, Huiri distinguished himself by propagating Pure Land practices among the common people. His teachings emphasized a holistic approach that harmonized various Buddhist practices, including meditation, devotional worship, recitation of the Buddha's name (nianfo), and adherence to monastic discipline. Cimin focused on teaching and practice instead of on scholarship. Thus, according to Japanese scholar Gemmyo Ono:

Though he studied the Buddhist philosophy in India for eighteen years and had a profound knowledge of the doctrine of Yogacara, he did not translate any Sanskrit sutra, nor did he write any commentaries on the Chinese translations. He devoted all his time to the practice and propagation of the Pure Land doctrine; all his literary activity was directed towards the encouragement of the nembutsu practice.

=== Defense of Pure Land ===
Huiri’s Pure Land teaching and holistic view of Buddhism brought him into conflict with followers of the Chan tradition, some of whom criticized Pure Land practices as being a dualistic teaching suitable only for spiritually inferior practitioners. Huiri launched a serious defense and counterattack against the Chan school's critiques. This is found in his major work, the Collection Outlining Various Scriptures and Treatises Regarding Methods of Contemplating the Buddha and Rebirth in the Pure Land (Lueh chu-ching lun nien-fo fa-men wang-sheng ching-t'u chi). Only the first part of this text survives, which contains his defense of Pure Land and refutation of Chan's criticisms. According to David W. Chappell, since Huiri had moved to Guangdong in Southern China, he could have encountered the disciples of Shenhui (684–758), and thus, his writings might have been a response to their attacks on Pure Land devotion.

Huiri criticizes certain Chan masters for promoting only dwelling in emptiness and seeing the world as non-existentand so on. According to Huiri, these masters are in error and contrary to the scriptures and the Buddha's teachings, which promote all of these skillful means. Furthermore, Huiri argues that Chan masters who reject all these are also guilty of being arrogant, falsely believing themselves to be wise. He notes that these masters have not even achieved true samadhi since they lack the five supernatural powers which arise from it. He also argues that since they have not achieved these attainments, then they are guilty of the Vinaya offense of falsely claiming to be enlightened. Thus, Huiri warns that these people are unenlightened commoners: "Don't rely on the teachings of these Ch'an masters...they are common men, and none of them has realized true understanding." According to Huiri, most of these Chan monks do a little meditation in the evening, and for the rest of the day, they neglect discipline, sleeping, or doing other things instead of practicing.

In response to the Chan critique that Pure Land practice is attached to form and methods, Huiri cites eight scriptures that recommend nianfo (mindfulness of the Buddha), writing that since these scriptures recommend nianfo as leading to enlightenment, to reject them "is a rejection of the holy teaching. It is to speak falsehoods and is not the cause for attaining Buddhahood. How can anyone be so reckless!" He also cites the Diamond Sutra, which recommends its own reading and recitation. Huiri sees the Chan approach of his opponents as unbalanced and focused on only one aspect of the Dharma, while rejecting the others which are clearly taught by the Buddha in the scriptures. While Huiri understands that classic Buddhist practices make use of forms and methods which are relative, this does not mean they do not lead to awakening.

Huiri was also concerned with the inward and isolationist tendencies of Chan and Vinaya monks at the time. He believed that spreading the Dharma to the masses the most important objective for a Mahayanist. For Huiri, to turn to living in mountains aiming solely at transcendental perfection was to abandon one's role as a bodhisattva to spread Dharma in society.

=== Pure Land teaching ===
In spite of his criticisms, Cimin does think that Chan can lead to awakening, but he argues that to actually attain this through Chan alone is very difficult. He contrasts this with the Pure Land path which is easy, since it relies on the Buddha's power to achieve birth in the Pure Land, where one can then study all the Dharma easily.

Huiri developed a practice framework that combined the practice of nianfo with traditional Buddhist practices of wisdom, meditation and moral discipline. He asserted that all the Buddhist practices were equally aligned with the principle of “suchness” (如如) and ultimately leading to perfect enlightenment. His system is comprehensive and includes numerous elements that support Pure Land practice including:

1. being compassionate, not killing, and maintaining all the precepts, this includes vegetarianism and avoiding alcohol
2. upholding, reading, and reciting the Mahayana sutras;
3. cultivating the six forms of mindfulness and dedicating the merit of that cultivation to being reborn in the Pure Land. The six are: mindfulness (nianfo) of (I) the Buddha, (2) the Dharma, (3) the Sangha, (4) giving, (5) the precepts, and (6) the heavens and pure land, including the bodhisattvas as taught in the Contemplation Sutra. Basically, these practices entail nien-fo, scripture chanting, and invocation of the bodhisattvas, in addition to vegetarianism.

Apart from the first third of his magnum opus, two other works by Cimin also survive, having been recently discovered. These are Ching- tu-ts‘u-pei-chi (Pure Land Mercy Collection) and Hsi-fang-tsan (Western Quarter Hymn).

=== Legacy and Influence ===
The Tang Emperor Xuanzong (玄宗; r. 712–756) recognized Huiri’s contributions by granting him the title Cimin Sanzang (“Tripitaka Master Cimin”, meaning “Compassionate and Benevolent.” Huiri’s integration of Pure Land practices with meditation profoundly influenced later developments in Chinese Buddhism. Notably, Huiri converted Ch'eng-yuan (713–803) to Pure Land Buddhism from Chan. Ch'eng-yuan would later become the teacher of Fazhao, the most influential Pure Land master in the ninth century. This is considered to be the direct lineage of Cimin.

Cimin's writings later inspired figures such as Yongming Yanshou (永明延壽; 904–975), who quotes Huiri and further developed the synthesis of nianfo and Chan practice into a holistic system similar to Cimin's.

Yuanzhao (1048–1116) reprinted Huiri's work in the Song dynasty. However, Huiri's sharp critiques of Chan led to complaints by Chan followers to the imperial authorities, who banned the circulation of Huiri's text and destroyed the printing blocks.

In Japan, Cimin's works were reprinted until the middle of the Heian period (794–1192). Technically speaking, the Japanese pure land school that begins with Hōnen (1133–1212) is directly connected with Cimin through the Tendai monk Ennin (794–864 CE) who traveled to China and studied the Pure Land teaching of Fazhao's five tone nembutsu.

His works were also transmitted in Korea, where some copies have survived.

== See also ==
- Shandao
- Tanluan
- Yuanzhao
