= Yuanzhao =

Scholar-monk during the Song dynasty

Yuanzhao (Chinese: 元照, 1048–1116), styled Zanran Yuanzhao and Lingzhi Yuanzhao (靈芝元照) was a distinguished scholar-monk and Vinaya master of the Vinaya school during the Song dynasty (960–1279 CE). He also taught and wrote on Pure Land Buddhism and Tiantai. After a period of illness later in life, he became a staunch Pure Land Buddhist, composing commentaries on the Amitabha Sutra and the Contemplation Sutra. Yuanzhao was a key reformer of the Vinaya school during the Song dynasty, widely administering its monastic ordination ceremonies to monks and bodhisattva precepts to laypersons. He is also one of the most prominent Song era Pure Land commentators whose works are still extant.

== Overview ==
A native of Yuhang (modern Zhejiang Province), he was born in 1048, the eighth year of the Qingli reign, with the secular surname Tang (唐). Ordained under Master Huijian at Xiangfu Temple in Qiantang, his early accomplishments included an outstanding performance in the national ordination examination for monks, where he demonstrated exceptional proficiency in reciting the Lotus Sutra.

=== Vinaya school ===
Yuanzhao studied Tiantai under Shenwu Chuqian (神悟處謙, 1011–1075) and Vinaya under Guangci Huicai (廣慈慧才, 998–1083). By 1078, he had received the Bodhisattva Precepts and devoted himself to restoring the Nanshan tradition of the Four-Part Vinaya (Dharmaguptaka Vinaya), emphasizing strict adherence to monastic discipline and alms-begging practices. He also wrote commentaries to the works of Daoxuan (7th century), the Vinaya master who founded the Nashan tradition. This commitment aligned with his broader aim to revive and systematize the Vinaya tradition, which had suffered setbacks due to prior political persecutions during the Tang and Five Dynasties periods.

Yuanzhao's interpretations diverged from those of fellow Vinaya scholar Yun Kan. Their disagreements over ritual practices—including circumambulation directions and monk robe lengths—led to a schism within the Vinaya school. Yuanzhao's lineage became known as the Zichi faction, distinguishing itself from Yun Kan's Huizheng faction.

Yuanzhao spent over thirty years in Hangzhou, attending to various temples, including Fahui (法慧), Dabei (大悲), Xiangfu Jietan (祥符戒壇), Jintu Baoge (淨土寶閣), Lingzhi Chongfu (靈芝崇福). At these temples he gathered disciples and conducted thousands of ordination ceremonies for the bodhisattva precepts, as well as numerous other ordination ceremonies. The grand ordination he led at Kaiyuan Temple in 1098, known as the “Flourishing Ordinations of the Southeast,” epitomized his impact on Chinese Buddhist monasticism.

Yuanzhao died in 1116, and Emperor Gaozong posthumously honored him as “Great Wisdom Vinaya Master” in 1141. His works and reforms played a pivotal role in the resurgence of the Vinaya school and the broader revitalization of Chinese Buddhist monasticism.

Yuanzhao's efforts in revitalizing the Vinaya school were multi-faceted and included three main elements:

- Ritual Innovations: Yuanzhao reformed monastic rituals, such as the Essence of Precepts ceremony, to enhance cohesion within the monastic community and bridge connections with the lay Buddhist population. He revised manuals for conferring precepts, including those for novices and the Bodhisattva Precepts for lay practitioners, thereby broadening the scope of Vinaya practice.
- Doctrinal Codification: He established the Ten Main Principles of the Vinaya School, providing a clear framework for upholding precepts. His writings emphasized the foundational role of Buddhist precepts (sila) in spiritual development, asserting that strict observance was essential from ordination to eventual rebirth in Amitabha's Pure Land.
- Lineage Reformulation: Yuanzhao compiled the Lineage Chart of Nanshan Vinaya Masters (Nanshan Lü Zong Zucheng Tulu), which standardized the Vinaya lineage by designating nine patriarchs. This effort consolidated the Nanshan Vinaya tradition, earning him recognition as its restorer.

=== Pure Land Teaching ===
Yuanzhao's activities also extended into Pure Land Buddhism and Tiantai Buddhism (which also had a Pure Land tradition) and he is known for having integrated these traditions into the Vinaya school. Initially a critic of Pure Land Buddhism, Yuanzhao had a deep conversion experience to Pure Land later in life after a serious illness during which he also read the Jingtu shiyi lun (淨土十疑論), a Tiantai Pure Land text attributed to Zhiyi (an unlikely attribution). After this (by around 1094 when he was 47) Yuanzhao became one of the most outspoken defenders of Pure Land Buddhism in his time. He also conducted several Pure Land services for the people.

Yuanzhao's approach to Pure Land practice combined meditative visualization and recitation of Amitabha's name, as seen in his commentaries on the Contemplation Sutra and Amitabha Sutra. His commentaries are influenced by numerous earlier Pure Land works, like the Tiantai commentary attributed to Zhiyi, Ciyun Zunshi's (964~1032) writings and Shandao's commentary to the Contemplation Sutra. According to Chi-chiang Huang. "Yuanzhao thought that the diverse opinion shown in these commentaries confused Pure Land aspirants, and made the possibility of finding a good path to the Pure Land very difficult for them. He felt incumbent upon himself to put together a coherent and comprehensive commentary by consulting all references and exegeses, collating and redacting old and new texts, selecting those he considered better interpretations and expunging bad ones."

As befitting his status as a Vinaya master, Yuanzhao also promoted the importance of keeping the bodhisattva precepts as a way to advance on the pure land path and attain birth in the pure land. During a lecture to the visiting Korean monk Ŭich’on (義天), Yuanzhao said that he taught two main points to all aspirants: a good beginning and an aspiring mind through to the end. A good beginning referred to receiving the precepts and upholding them carefully. Regarding aspiring all the way to the end, Yuanzhao meant that one should be determined and dedicated to birth in the Pure Land. Yuanzhao also incorporated Pure Land elements into the Bodhisattva precept ordination ceremonies, which he administered over sixty times to over ten thousand people.

Yuanzhao argued that to be able to practice contemplation or guan (觀), one needed to practice the three pure acts taught in the Contemplation Sutra. The three pure acts (which include keeping precepts and reciting sutras) evoked the Buddha's blessings (fuye 福業) which supported the practice of contemplation. Thus, to practice correct guan (zheng guan 正觀) one must thus keep precepts. Yuanzhao compares the three pure acts to a shipload of treasures and contemplation to the ship's mast. He also links them with phenomenon (shi 事) and principle (li 理) respectively.

Yuanzhao also connects the three minds of faith taught by Shandao to the three clusters of bodhisattva precepts, writing:

An earnest mind means earnestly observing the restraining precepts to end all evildoing. A profound mind means doing all good dharmas to deepen one's mind. A mind wishing for rebirth in the Pure Land as one transfers one's merits to other sentient beings means benefiting all in their deliverance.

As such, Yuanzhao's Pure Land commentaries provide a holistic approach to Pure Land practice which includes meditation (guan), oral recitation, keeping precepts, vows and devotion.

Yuanzhao's commentaries also make use of the Tiantai teaching which argued that “the Mind is the Pure Land” (weixin jingtu 唯心淨土). This teaching is based on Tiantai's teaching of the three thousand realms being included in a single moment of thought.

In spite of his reliance on Shandao, Yuanzhao disagrees with the master on one important issue. Yuanzhao does not agree with Shandao that the first thirteen contemplations taught in the Contemplation Sutra are "meditative goods" while the three pure acts and the last three contemplations are "non-meditative goods". For Yuanzhao, the Contemplation Sutra is clearly teaching sixteen contemplations, and each of them is a kind of meditation.

Regarding the practice of meditative contemplation (or visualization, guan) and oral recitation of the Buddha's name (nian), Yuanzhao sees both of these as interconnected practices which focus on seeing the Buddha in one's mind. Due to this they are unique practices different from the contemplation of the mind (guanxin). Some authors of the Tiantai school like Siming Zhili had argued that the Contemplation Sutra was teaching a kind of contemplation of the mind similar to that taught in Tiantai. But according to Yuanzhao, the sutra's meditation "aims at delivering the mind to another realm" (songxin tajing 送心他境) and at "protection through the power of a holy being" (shengde huchi 聖德護持). This is thus a different kind of method than the Tiantai practice of meditating on one's thoughts.

In his commentary on the Contemplation Sutra, Yuanzhao also answers various critiques of Pure Land common in his time. One of these was that the practice of Pure Land contemplation amounts to an “attachment to characteristics” (zhaoxiang 著相). In response, Yuanzhao argues that the practice of nianfo has no characteristics to which one could be attached, since contemplating nianfo is contemplating the Buddha.

== Works ==
His major works include:

- Commentary to the [Dharmaguptaka] Four-Part Vinaya (四分律行事鈔資持記 Sifen Lü Xingshi Chao Zichi Ji) – 42 scrolls
- Karmavacana Notes for the Four-Part Vinaya (Sifen Lü Jiemojiao Ji Yuan Ji) – 22 scrolls
- Annotated Precept Text of the Four-Part Vinaya (Sifen Lü Han Zhu Jieben Shu Xingzong Ji) – 21 scrolls
- Commentary on the Contemplation Sutra of Infinite Life (Guan Wuliangshou Jing Yi Shu) – 3 scrolls
- Commentary on the Amitabha Sutra (Amituo Jing Yi Shu) – 1 scroll
- Collection of the Lingzhi Garden (Zhi Yuan Ji) – 2 scrolls
- Supplementary Collection of the Lingzhi Garden (Bu Xu Zhi Yuan Ji) – 1 scroll
- Remaining Writings of the Lingzhi Garden (Zhi Yuan Yi Bian) – 3 scrolls
- Record of Abiding Dharma (Fazhu Ji), a commentary on the Sutra of Bequeathed Teachings – 1 scroll
- Record of Repaying Gratitude (Baoen Ji), a commentary on the Ullambana Sutra – 1 scroll
- Record of Manifestation and Transformation (Yinghua Ji), a commentary on Daoxuan's Monastic Regulations and Attire – 1 scroll
- Illustrated Guide to the Six Essentials for Monks (Fozhi Biqiu Liuwu Tu) – 1 scroll
- Ode to Monastic Implements (Daoju Fu) – 1 scroll

== See also ==
- Shandao
- Cimin Huiri
- Siming Zhili
