= Zen scriptures =

Literature as part of zen teaching

Though Zen is said to be based on a "special transmission outside scriptures" which "did not stand upon words", the Zen-tradition has a rich doctrinal and textual background. It has been influenced by sutras such as the Lankavatara Sutra, the Vimalakirti Sutra, the Avatamsaka Sutra, and the Lotus Sutra.

Subsequently, the Zen tradition produced a rich corpus of written literature which has become a part of its practice and teaching, including the Platform Sutra, lineage charts, collected sayings of Zen-masters, and the koan-literature.

== The role of scripture in Zen ==
Contrary to the popular image, literature does play a role in the Zen-training. Unsui, Zen-monks, "are expected to become familiar with the classics of the Zen canon". A review of the early historical documents and literature of early Zen masters clearly reveals that they were well versed in numerous Mahāyāna Buddhist sūtras.

Nevertheless, Zen is often pictured as anti-intellectual. This picture of Zen emerged during the Song dynasty (960–1297), when Chan became the dominant form of Buddhism in China, and gained great popularity among the educated and literary classes of Chinese society. The use of koans, which are highly stylized literary texts, reflects this popularity among the higher classes.

In the tenth century, during the turmoil of the Five Dynasties and Ten Kingdoms period, regionally oriented schools with differing views on the Chan-identity developed. One view was that of jiaowai biechuan (教外別傳), "a special transmission outside the teaching". The opposing view was jiaochan yizhi (教禪一致), "the harmony between Chan and the teaching". The view of the harmony between Chan and the teachings was dominant in the lineage of Fa-ten Wen-i (885–958), and prevailed in the Southern Kingdoms in the tenth century. Thereafter the notion of a "special transmission outside the teachings" became dominant.

The famous saying "do not establish words and letters", attributed in this period to Bodhidharma,

...was taken not as a denial of the recorded words of the Buddha or the doctrinal elaborations by learned monks, but as a warning to those who had become confused about the relationship between Buddhist teaching as a guide to the truth and mistook it for the truth itself.

The Chan of the Tang dynasty, especially that of Mazu and Linji with its emphasis on "shock techniques", in retrospect was seen as a golden age of Chan. This picture has gained great popularity in the west in the 20th century, especially due to the influence of D.T. Suzuki. This picture has been challenged, and changed, since the 1970s by "modern scientific research" on Zen.

The Zen tradition, especially Rinzai Zen, aims to give a direct transmission of insight, and stresses the impossibility of giving any positive statement of this insight. This is famously worded in a 12th-century stanza, attributed to Bodhidharma: (Note: According to Whalen Lai, this stanza "point[s] more directly to the Zen of the Hung-chou school" of Ma-tsu)

A special transmission outside the scriptures,

Not founded upon words and letters. (Note: Whalen Lai translates this line as "No postulating (li) of (any positive) thesis in words")
By pointing directly to [one's] mind,

It lets one see into [one's own true] nature and [thus] attain Buddhahood. (Note: In The Essential Determination, a text by Chih-ta (d. 714), a student of Shen-hui, "contemplative analysis" is applied to a line from the Diamond Sutra: "Should view the locus of non-being". The text then proceeds: Question: "What thing does one see?" Answer: "The [Nirvana] Sutra says: 'See the [Buddha]-nature and achieve the enlightenment of Buddhahood'.")

An example of this non-dependence on words and scripture in 9th century China is Teshan (Tokusan 780–865). He became famous for burning his commentaries on the Diamond sutra, when he realized that his attachment to these commentaries had become a stumbling block on his way to gaining insight. (Note: Tokusan is being mentioned in case 13 and 28 of the Mumonkan, and case 4 of the Blue Cliff Record)

Hisamatsu states it more bluntly:

From the Zen perspective, scriptures are nothing but scraps of paper for wiping up filth. (Note: This is a reference to the Record of Linji: Someone asked, "What about the state where ‘mind and Mind do not differ’?" The master said, "The instant you ask the question they are already separate, and essence differs from its manifestations. "Followers of the Way, make no mistake! All the dharmas of this world and of the worlds beyond are without self-nature. Also, they are without produced nature. They are just empty names, and these names are also empty. All you are doing is taking these worthless names to be real. That’s all wrong! Even if they do exist, they are nothing but states of dependent transformation, such as the dependent transformations of bodhi, nirvana, emancipation, the threefold body, the [objective] surroundings and the [subjective] mind, bodhisattvahood, and buddhahood. What are you looking for in these lands of dependent transformations! All of these, up to and including the Three Vehicles’ twelve divisions of teachings, are just so much waste paper to wipe off privy filth. The buddha is just a phantom body, the patriarchs just old monks.)

Masao Abe points out that the role of the intellect in the understanding of Zen should not be misunderstood:

It is clear that Zen is not a philosophy. It is beyond words and intellect and is not, as in the case of philosophy, a study of the processes governing thought and conduct, nor a theory of principles or laws that regulate people and the universe. For the realisation of Zen, practice is absolutely necessary. Nevertheless, Zen is neither a mere anti-intellectualism nor a cheap intuitism nor is it an encouragement to animal-like spontaneity. Rather, it embraces a profound philosophy. Although intellectual understanding cannot be a substitute for Zen's awakening, practice without a proper and legitimate form of intellectual understanding is often misleading.

Arokiasamy warns against this

... misleading notion about Awakening which holds that Zen and Awakening are non-intellectual [...] This arises not only from misconstruing the nature of language as merely literal, descriptive and representational but also misunderstanding the nature of Awakening as a literal seeing into reality as such".

The importance given to Zen's non-reliance on written words is also often misunderstood as an opposition to the study of Buddhist texts. However, Zen is deeply rooted in the teachings and doctrines of Mahāyāna Buddhism (Note: Albert Low: "It is evident that the masters were well versed in the sutras. Zen master Tokusan, for example, knew the Diamond Sutra well and, before meeting with bhis own Zen master, lectured upon it extensively; the founder of the Zen sect, Bodhidharma, the very one who preached selfrealization outside the scriptures, nevertheless advocated the Lankavatara Sutra; Zen master Hogen knew the Avatamsaka Sutra well, and koan twenty-six in the Mumonkan, in which Hogen is involved, comes out of the teaching of that sutra. Other koans, too, make reference directly or indirectly to the sutras. The autobiography of yet another Zen master, Hui Neng, subsequently became the Platform Sutra, one of those sutras so condemned by those who reject intellectual and sutra studies") (Note: Poceski: "Direct references to specific scriptures are relatively rare in the records of Mazu and his disciples, but that does not mean that they rejected the canon or repudiated its authority. To the contrary, one of the striking features of their records is that they are filled with scriptural quotations and allusions, even though the full extend of their usage of canonical sources is not immediately obvious and its discernment requires familiarity with Buddhist literature." See source for a full-length example from "one of Mazu's sermons", in which can be found references to the Vimalakīrti Scripture, the Huayan Scripture, the Mahāsamnipata-sūtra, the Foshuo Foming Scripture 佛說佛名經, the Lankāvatāra scripture and the Faju jing,) and gradually developed its own literature. What the Zen tradition emphasizes is that enlightenment of the Buddha came not through conceptualization, but rather through direct insight:

Despite its teaching of "no dependence upon words and letters," Chan did not reject the scriptures of the Buddhist canon, but simply warned of the futility of relying on them for the attainment of emancipating insight. The sacred texts — and much more so the huge exegetical apparatus that had grown up around them in the older scholastic schools — were regarded as no more than signposts pointing the way to liberation. Valuable though they were as guides, they needed to be transcended in order for one to awaken to the true intent of Śākyamuni’s teachings.

But direct insight has to be supported by study and understanding (hori of the Buddhist teachings and texts. Hakuin goes as far as to state that the buddhist path even starts with study:

[A] person [...] must first gain wide-ranging knowledge, accumulate a treasure-store of wisdom by studying all the Buddhist sutras and commentaries, reading through all the classic works Buddhist and nonBuddhist and perusing the writings of the wise men of other traditions. It is for that reason the vow states "the Dharma teachings are infinite, I vow to study them all.

Intellectual understanding without practice is called yako-zen, "wild fox Zen", but "one who has only experience without intellectual understanding is a zen temma, "Zen devil"".

== Grounding Chan in scripture ==
The early Buddhist schools in China were each based on a specific sutra. At the beginning of the Tang dynasty, by the time of the Fifth Patriarch Hongren (601–674), the Zen school became established as a separate school of Buddhism. It had to develop a doctrinal tradition of its own to ascertain its position, and to ground its teachings in a specific sutra. Various sutras were used for this, even before the time of Hongren: the Śrīmālādevī Sūtra (Huike), Awakening of Faith (Daoxin), the Lankavatara Sutra (East Mountain School), the Diamond Sutra (Shenhui), the Platform Sutra. Subsequently, the Zen tradition produced a rich corpus of written literature which has become a part of its practice and teaching.

Other influential sutras are the Vimalakirti Sutra, Avatamsaka Sutra, the Shurangama Sutra, and the Mahaparinirvana Sutra.

The growing Chan tradition also faced the challenge to put its teachings into words, to bolster its identity and to apply it in formal teaching settings, without losing the central insight into the "suchness" of reality. One solution to this was the shift of emphasis from the recorded sayings of the historical Buddha, to the sayings of living Buddhas, namely the Chan masters. In time, these sayings, from the so-called "encounter-dialogues" between masters and students, but also from sermons, became codified and formed the basis of typical Zen-genres, namely the "yü-lü" (recorded sayings) and the classic koan-collections. These too became formalised, and as such became a subject of disputes on the right way to teach Zen and the avoidance of dependence on words.

== Influential sutras ==
=== Lankavatara Sutra ===
In its beginnings in China, Zen primarily referred to the Mahāyāna sūtras and especially to the Laṅkāvatāra Sūtra. As a result, early masters of the Zen tradition were referred to as "Laṅkāvatāra masters". As the Laṅkāvatāra Sūtra teaches the doctrine of the "One Vehicle" (Skt. Ekayāna), the early Zen school was sometimes referred to as the "One Vehicle School". In other early texts, the school that would later become known as Zen is sometimes even referred to as simply the "Laṅkāvatāra school" (Ch. 楞伽宗, Léngqié Zōng). Accounts recording the history of this early period are to be found in Records of the Laṅkāvatāra Masters (Ch. 楞伽師資記, Léngqié Shīzī Jì).

=== Diamond Sutra ===
During the Tang dynasty, the Zen school's central text shifted to the Diamond Sūtra (Vajracchedikā Prajñāpāramitā Sūtra). Thereafter, the essential texts of the Zen school were often considered to be the Laṅkāvatāra Sūtra and the Diamond Sūtra.

The reasons for this shift are not clear. Whalen Lai writes:

Up to that point [Shenhui (670–762)], the school did not call itself Chan (meditation), a rather colorless name. It was in fact still looking for a name, and the custom then was to tie a new teaching to a sutra. Huike used the Srimala sutra, but Daoxin later drew inspiration from the Awakening of Faith. Members of the East Mountain Teaching, realizing that the Awakening of Faith was a sastra, came up with the next best; they conjured up a lineage of Lankavatara sutra masters, this being the sutra that informed the Awakening of Faith. Shenhui then perpetuated the myth that Huineng favored the Diamond Sutra. Actually, none of these labels really identifies the school’s ideological affiliation, because this tradition apparently never used one sutra to legitimize itself.

Kalupahana does see a struggle to give clues to students about ultimate reality, without going back to scripture (e.g. the Lankavatara-sutra). According to him, the use of kung-an's served this role. The prajnaparamita-sutras are a reaction against the early Buddhist philosophical schools, especially the realistic approach of the Sarvastivadins, (Note: The reaction against this realism of the Sarvastivadins, who held that "things do exist in a real sense [and] [p]ast and future also possess real existence", can be recognized in case 28 of the Mumonkan, on Tokusan and the Diamond Sutra: "The old woman said, "I hear it is said in that sutra, 'The past mind cannot be held, the present mind cannot be held, the future mind cannot be held.' Now, I would like to ask you, what mind are you going to have refreshed?"") and a return to the notion of non-substantiality. According to Kalupahana, also in Chan the use of...

...the Vajracchedika represents an attempt to return to the Buddha's teaching, which were gradually becoming infested with absolute and transcendentalist metaphysics.

=== Vimalakirti Sutra ===
The Vimalakirti Sutra is an early Mahayana Sutra dating from the second century CE. The sutra centers on the person of the householder Vimalakirti, who's being visited by various bodhisattvas while he's ill.

The Vimalakirti Sutra stresses that...

[A]wakening by itself is not enough [...] [A]fter awakening more work remains to be done to perfect the awakening.

The sutra is grounded on the prajnaparamita-teachings on emptiness. This is the central theme in "the dialogue between the bodhisattvas and Vimalakirti on the subject of nonduality". While discussing this subject, the bodhisattvas give a variety of answers. Manjusri is the last bodhisattva to answer, who says that "by giving an explanation they have already fallen into dualism". Vimalakirti, in his turn, answers with silence. (Note: This dialogue is being treated in case 84 of the Hekiganroku)

This silence became paradigmatic for the Chan-tradition:

Thus are all Zen masters reluctant to express enlightenment, the condition of nonduality, in words or signs.

=== Avatamsaka Sutra ===
The Avatamsaka Sutra is a compilation of sutras of various length. The earliest of these texts, the Daśabhūmika Sūtra, maybe dates from the first century CE. The Daśabhūmika Sūtra describes the ten stages on the Bodhisattva-path. The various sutras were probably joined shortly before its translation into Chinese, at the beginning of the 5th century CE.

The Avatamsaka ("garland", string of flowers) sutra integrates the teachings on sunyata and vijnaptimatra (mind-only). The Huayan school, that originated in the same period as Chan, and influenced the Chan-school, was based on the Avatamsaka Sutra.

The basic idea of the Avatamsaka Sutra is the unity of the absolute and the relative:

All in One, One in All. The All melts into a single whole. There are no divisions in the totality of reality [...] [I]t views the cosmos as holy, as "one bright pearl," the universal reality of the Buddha. The universal Buddhahood of all reality is the religious message of the Avatamsaka-sutra.

Each part of the world reflects the totality of the cosmos:

In each dust-mote of these worlds

Are countless worlds and Buddhas...
From the tip of each hair of Buddha's body
Are revealed the indescribable Pure Lands...
The indescribable infinite Lands

All ensemble in a hair's tip [of Buddha].

All levels of reality are related and interpenetrated. This is depicted in the image of Indra's net. This "unity in totality allows every individual entity of the phenomenal world its uniqueness without attributing an inherent nature to anything".

The Hua-yen school persistently influenced Chan. Tsung-mi, the Fifth Patriarch of the Hua-yen school, also occupies a prominent position in the history of Chan. During the Song, the Hua-yen metaphysics were completely assimilated by the Chan-school.

The Avatamsaka Sutra is being referred to, directly or indirectly, in Chan-writings. Xinxin Ming's Faith in mind is "in many passages [...] akin to the Avatamsaka sutra, especially the closing stanzas". Tsung-mi's writings reflect his Hua-yen influences.

== Zen literature ==
The Zen-tradition developed a rich textual tradition, based on the interpretation of the Buddhist teachings and the recorded sayings of Zen-masters.

=== Chinese texts ===
==== Introduction ====
Chan literature (Chinese: 禪宗文學, often specifically 禪宗語錄, lit. Chan's selected sayings) is a genre of Chinese buddhism literature popularized by the school of Zen (禪, in Mandarin spelling, Chan) in Tang dynasty. The three most studied Chinese texts, according to a comprehensive survey of 477 papers in 2017, are the Anthology of the Patriarchal Hall (38%), the Compendium of Five Lamps (9%) and the Transmission of the Lamp (6%).

==== Hui-neng's Platform Sutra ====
Platform Sutra of the Sixth Patriarch is an early Chan text, dating back to at least the 8th century, attributed to Huineng. It is...

...a wonderful melange of early Chan teachings, a virtual repository of the entire tradition up to the second half of the eighth century. At the heart of the sermon is the same understanding of the Buddha-nature that we have seen in texts attributed to Bodhidharma and Hingren, including the idea that the fundamental Buddha-nature is only made invisible to ordinary humans by their illusions".

The Platform Sūtra cites and explains a wide range of Buddhist scriptures: the Diamond Sūtra, the Lotus Sūtra (Saddharma Puṇḍarīka Sūtra), the Vimalakīrti Nirdeśa Sūtra, the Śūraṅgama Sūtra, the Laṅkāvatāra Sūtra, the Awakening of Faith in the Mahayana-sutra, and the Mahaparinirvana Sutra.

==== Transmission of the Lamp ====
The Chan-tradition developed from the established tradition of "Canonical Buddhism", which "remained normative for all later Chinese Buddhism". It was established by the end of the sixth century, as a result of the Chinese developing understanding of Buddhism in the previous centuries. One of the inventions of this Canonical Buddhism were transmission lists, called "Transmission of the Lamp", a literary device to establish a lineage. Both T'ien Tai and Chan took over this literary device, to lend authority to those developing traditions, and guarantee its authenticity:

Chan texts present the school as Buddhism itself, or as the central teaching of Buddhism, which has been transmitted from the seven Buddhas of the past to the twenty-eight patriarchs, and all the generations of Chinese and Japanese Chan and Zen masters that follow.

Another literary device for establishing those traditions was given by the Kao-seng-chuan (Biographies of Eminent Monks), compiles around 530. The Chan-tradition developed its own corpus in this genre, with works as Anthology of the Patriarchal Hall (952) and the Jingde Records of the Transmission of the Lamp (published 1004). McRae considers Dumoulin's A History of Zen to be a modern example of this genre, disguised as scientific history.

Chan transmission records, teng-lu, were essential in shaping the identity of Chan. The Records of the Transmission of the Lamp (Ching-te ch'uan-teng lu), compiled by Tao-yün and published in 1004, introduced several of the key elements of the Chan-tradition. Another key text is the "Record of the Extensive Transmission [of the Lamp] compiled during the T'ien-sheng era" (T'ien-sheng kuang-teng lu), compiled by Li Tsun-hsü and published in 1036, which clearly introduced the idea of "a special transmission outside the teaching". Until the T'ien-sheng kuang-teng lu, Chan was viewed as a teaching in harmony with the Buddhist scriptural tradition. In the tenth century, during the turmoil of the Five Dynasties and Ten Kingdoms period, regionally oriented schools with differing views on the Chan-identity developed. One view was that of chiao-wai pieh-ch'uan, "a special transmission outside the teaching". The opposing view was chiao-ch'an i-chih, "the harmony between Chan and the teaching". The view of the harmony between Chan and the teachings was dominant in the lineage of Fa-ten Wen-i (885–958), and prevailed in the Southern Kingdoms in the tenth century.

The original preface to the Ching-te ch'uan-teng lu by Tao-yüan reflects this Fa-yen position of harmony with the teachings. It was replaced by an introduction by Yang I, which emphasised "a special practice outside the teaching":

According to Tao-yüan, "[Bodhidharma] did not make a display of verbal expressions [pu-shih yü-yen], and did not establish words and letters [pu-li wen-tzu]." According to Yang I, [Bodhidharma taught]: do not establish words and letters [pu-li wen-tzu], directly point to the source of mind [ch'ih-chih shin-yüan]; do not engage in gradual methods [pu-chien chieh-ti], attain Buddhahood immediately [ching-teng fo-ti].

The differences go back to the interpretation of the Long Scroll of the Treatise on the Two Entrances and Four Practices, a text attributed to Bodhidharma. In this text, the "entrance by principle" (li-ju) is characterized in two ways:

Entrance by principle is said to "awaken one to the truth [wu-tsung] in accordance with [scriptural] teaching [chi-chiao]." Later, after realizing true nature [chen-hsing], one is said to "reside fixedly, without wavering, never again to be swayed by written teachings [wen-chiao]."

The first statement can be seen as a support of the harmony between the teachings and Chan. The second statement can be seen as a support of a "special transmission outside the teachings".

==== Recorded Sayings and Encounter Dialogue ====
From the "question-and-answer format that had been developed as a means of conveying Buddhist teachings" developed the "yü-lü" genre, the recorded sayings of the masters, and the encounter dialogues. The best-known example is the "Lin-ji yü-lü". (Note: Translation of the Lin-ji yü-lü by Fuller-Sasaki) These recorded sayings are not verbatim recordings of the sayings of the masters, but well-edited texts, written down up to 160 years after the supposed sayings and meetings.

==== Linji yulu ====
The Linji yulu ("Zhenzhou Linji Huizhao Chansi yulu") is the seminal text of the Linji and Rinzai school. It contains the recorded sayings attributed to Linji Yixuan (d. 866). It was published in 1120, but developed in a period stretching from 952 to 1120. The first mention of Linji is in the Zutang ji (祖堂集 "Anthology of the Patriarchal Hall), compiled in 952, 86 years after Linji's death. The Jingde Chuangdeng lu (景德傳燈錄 "Jingde Records of the Transmission of the Lamp"), compiled in 1004 by Daoyuan, gives brief biographical information on Lijni, followed by Linji's interactions with Hunagbo, to strengthen the claim of Linji's descendancy form Hunagbo and the Mazu-lineage. The Tiansheng Guangdeng lu (天聖廣燈錄), "Tiansheng Era Expanded Lamp Record", compiled by the official Li Zunxu (李遵勗)(988–1038) confirms the status of Shoushan Shengnian, but also pictures Linji as a major Chan patriarch and heir to the Hongzhou school of Mazu Daoyi, displacing the prominence of the Fayan-lineage. It also established the slogan of "a special transmission outside the teaching", supporting the Linji-school claim of "Chan as separate from and superior to all other Buddhist teachings". The Sijia yulu, ("Discourse Records of the Four Masters"), compiled 1066–1069 by Huanglong Huinan (1002–1069), contains the discourse records of Mazu Daoyi (709–788), Baizhang Huaihai (720–814), Huangbo Xiyun (died 850) and Linji, the major patriarchs of the Tang dynasty according to the Linji faction. In this text, Linji is explicitly placed in line with these teachers of the Hongzhou school. The Zhenzhou Linji Huizhao Chansi yulu ("The record of Linji"), compiled by Yuanjue Zongan in 1120, is the classic version of the record of Linji. Yuanjue Zongan belonged to the Yunmen-faction, and also re-issued the Yunmen yulu, the "Discourse Records of Yunmen". The separate publication of Linji's records signals the newly acquired status of Linji as one of Chan's major patriarchs.

==== Koan-collections ====
The "encounter dialogue"-genre developed into various collections of kōans, which form itself another extensive literary corpus.

Koan practice developed from a literary practice, styling snippets of encounter-dialogue into well-edited stories. It arose in interaction with "educated literati". There were dangers involved in such a literary approach, such as fixing specific meanings to the cases. Dahui Zonggao is even said to have burned the woodblocks of the Blue Cliff Record, for the hindrance it had become to study of Chan by his students.

The two best known koan-collections (in the West) are the "Gateless Gate" and the "Blue Cliff Record". The Gateless Gate (Chinese: 無門關 Wumenguan; Japanese: Mumonkan) is a collection of 48 kōans and commentaries published in 1228 by Chinese monk Wumen (無門) (1183–1260). The title may be more accurately rendered as Gateless Barrier or Gateless Checkpoint). The Blue Cliff Record (Chinese: 碧巖錄 Bìyán Lù; Japanese: Hekiganroku) is a collection of 100 kōans compiled in 1125 by Yuanwu Keqin (圜悟克勤 1063–1135).

=== Japanese texts ===
The Japanese Zen-tradition also developed a corpus of its own. During the Tokugawa-period Dōgen's Shōbōgenzō became the authoritative text of the Soto-school. In the Rinzai-school, the koan-curricula were systematized by dharma-heirs of Hakuin, who himself produced an extended corpus of written texts.

==== Dogen's Shōbōgenzō ====
During the Tokugawa-period the Soto-school started to place a growing emphasis on textual authority. In 1615 the bakufu declared that "Eheiji's standards (kakun) must be the rule for all Soto monks". In time this came to mean all the writings of Dogen, which thereby became the normative source for the doctrines and organisation of the Soto-school.

A key factor in this growing emphasis on Dogen was Manzan's appeal to change the rules for dharma transmission, based on arguments derived from the Shōbōgenzō. Another reformation was implemented by Gento Sokuchu (1729–1807), who tried to purify the Soto-school of the use of koans. Gento Sokuchu implanted new regulations, based on Dogen's regulations.

This growing status of Dogen as textual authority also posed a problem for the Soto-school:

The Soto hierarchy, no doubt afraid of what other radical reformers might find in Dogen's Shobo Genzo, a work open to a variety of interpretations, immediately took steps to restrict access to this traditional symbol of sectarian authority. Acting at the request of the Soto prelates, in 1722 the government prohibited the copying or publication of any part of Shobo Genzo.

During the Meiji Restoration, the memory of Dōgen was used to ensure Eihei-ji's central place in the Soto-organisation, and "to cement closer ties with lay people". In 1899 the first lay ordination ceremony was organized in Eihei-ji. Eihei-ji also promoted the study of Dōgen's works, especially the Shōbōgenzō, which changed the view of Dōgen in Soto's history.

==== Zenshū Shiburoku ====
The Zenshū Shiburoku, The Four Texts of the Zen Sect, is a collection of four essential Zen texts which are being used in Japan as introductory texts in the education of novice Zen monks. The collection consists of the Jūgyūzu (Ten Oxherding Pictures), the Shinjinmei (Faith in mind), attributed to the third Chinese Chan-patriarch Sengcan, the Shōdōka (Song of Enlightenment), attributed to Yongjia Xuanjue, and the Zazengi (The Principles of Zazen), written by Dogen. (Note: James Ismael Ford adds two more titles to this list: the Sandokai (Identity of Relative and Absolute) by Shitou Xiqian, and the Song of the Jeweled Mirror Samadhi by Dongshan Liangjia. (Note: James Ford (2007), Eight Essential (and Brief) Zen Texts) See Boundless Zen Liturgy for a translation.)

== See also ==
- Zen
- Chinese Chan

== Sources ==
- Abe, Masao (1989), Zen and Western Thought, Trans. by William R. LeFleur, University of Hawaii Press
- Abe, Masao; Heine, Seteven (1996), Zen and Comparative Studies, University of Hawaii Press
- Aitken, Robert (1994), Foreword to "A Buddhist Bible", Boston, Massachusetts: Beacon Press
- Arokiasamy, Arul M. (2005), Zen: Awakening to Your Original Face, Chennai, India: Thiruvanmiyur
- Bodiford, William M. (1991), Dharma Transmission in Soto Zen. Manzan Dohaku's Reform Movement. In: Monumenta Nipponica, Vol.46, No.4 (Winter, 1991), pp 423-451
- Bodiford, William M. (1993), Sōtō Zen in Medieval Japan, University of Hawaii Press, ISBN 978-0-8248-1482-3
- Bodiford, William M. (2006). "Remembering Dōgen: Eiheiji and Dōgen Hagiography". Society for Japanese Studies. 32 (1): 1–21. doi:10.1353/jjs.2006.0003. ISSN 1549-4721. S2CID 144431743.
- Buswell, Robert E. (1991), "The "Short-cut" Approach of K'an-hua Meditation: The Evolution of a Practical Subitism in Chinese Ch'an Buddhism", in Gregory, Peter N. (ed.), Sudden and Gradual. Approaches to Enlightenment in Chinese Thought, Delhi: Motilal Banarsidass Publishers
- Buswell, Robert E (1993), "Ch'an Hermeneutics: A Korean View", in Donald S. Lopez, Jr. (ed.), Buddhist Hermeneutics, Delhi: Motilal Banarsidass
- Blyth, R. H. (1966), Zen and Zen Classics, Volume 4, Tokyo: Hokuseido Press
- Chappell, David W. (1993), "Hermeneutical Phases in Chinese Buddhism", in Donald S. Lopez, Jr. (ed.), Buddhist Hermeneutics, Delhi: Motilal Banarsidass
- Collins, Randall (2000), The Sociology of Philosophies: A Global Theory of Intellectual Change, Harvard University Press
- Dumonlin, Heinrich (2000), A History of Zen Buddhism, New Delhi: Munshiram Manoharlal Publishers Pvt. Ltd., ISBN 978-81-215-0958-9
- Dumoulin, Heinrich (2005a), Zen Buddhism: A History. Volume 1: India and China, World Wisdom Books, ISBN 978-0-941532-89-1
- Dumoulin, Heinrich (2005b), Zen Buddhism: A History. Volume 2: Japan, World Wisdom Books, ISBN 978-0-941532-90-7
- Ferguson, Andy (2000), Zen's Chinese Heritage, Boston, MA: Wisdom Publications, ISBN 978-0-86171-163-5
- Ford, James Myoun, A Note On Dharma Transmission And The Institutions Of Zen
- Gregory, Peter N. (1991), Sudden Enlightenment Followed by Gradual Cultivation: Tsung-mi's Analysis of mind. In: Peter N. Gregory (editor)(1991), Sudden and Gradual. Approaches to Enlightenment in Chinese Thought, Delhi: Motilal Banarsidass Publishers
- Gregory, Peter N. (1993), "What Happened to the "Perfect Teaching"? Another lOok at Hua-yen Buddhist hermeneutics", in Donald S. Lopez, Jr. (ed.), Buddhist Hermeneutics, Delhi: Motilal Banarsidass
- Harvey, Peter (1995), An introduction to Buddhism. Teachings, history and practices, Cambridge University Press
- Haskel, Peter (1984), Bankei Zen. Translations from The Record of Bankei, New York: Grove Weidenfeld
- Heine, Steven; Wright, Dale S. (2000). The Koan: Texts and Contexts in Zen Buddhism. Oxford University Press. ISBN 0-19-511748-4.
- Heine, Steven (October 2007), "A Critical Survey of Works on Zen since Yampolsky.", Philosophy East and West, 57 (4): 577–592, doi:10.1353/pew.2007.0047, S2CID 170450246
- Heine, Steven (2008), Zen Skin, Zen Marrow
- Hisamatsu, Shin'ichi; Tokiwa, Gishin; Ives, Christopher (2002), Critical Sermons of the Zen Tradition: Hisamatsu's Talks on Linji, University of Hawaii Press
- Hori, Victor Sogen. "Koan and Kensho in the Rinzai Zen Curriculum". In Heine & Wright (2000).
- Hori, Victor Sogen (2005), Introduction. In: Dumoulin, Heinrich (2005), Zen Buddhism: A History. Volume 2: Japan. World Wisdom Books. ISBN 978-0-941532-90-7. Pagina xiii - xxi (PDF)
- Hu Shih (January 1953), "Ch'an (Zen) Buddhism in China. Its History and Method", Philosophy East and West, 3 (1): 3–24, doi:10.2307/1397361, JSTOR 1397361
- Huaijin, Nan (1997), Basic Buddhism: Exploring Buddhism and Zen, York Beach: Samuel Weiser
- Isshū, Miura; Sasaki, Ruth F. (1993), The Zen Koan, New York: Harcourt Brace & Company, ISBN 978-0-15-699981-6
- Jaksch, Mary (2007), The Road to Nowhere. Koans and the Deconstruction of the Zen Saga (PDF)
- Jorgensen, John (1991), "Heinrich Dumoulin's Zen Buddhism: A History", Japanese Journal of Religious Studies, 18 (4), doi:10.18874/jjrs.18.4.1991.377-400
- Jou, Bi-shiang [周碧香] (2017). 《雲門廣錄》詞彙探析 [An analysis of the vocabulary of the Record of Yunmen Wenyan]. Taipei: Wu-Nan Book.
- Kalupahana, David J. (1992), The Principles of Buddhist Psychology, Delhi: ri Satguru Publications
- Kalupahana, David J. (1994), A history of Buddhist philosophy, Delhi: Motilal Banarsidass Publishers
- Kapleau, Philip (1989), The three pillars of Zen
- Kasulis, Thomas P. (2003), Ch'an Spirituality. In: Buddhist Spirituality. Later China, Korea, Japan and the Modern World; edited by Takeuchi Yoshinori, Delhi: Motilal Banarsidass
- Lachs, Stuart (2006), The Zen Master in America: Dressing the Donkey with Bells and Scarves
- Lachs, Stuart (2012), Hua-t'ou : A Method of Zen Meditation (PDF)
- Lai, Whalen (n.d.), Buddhism in China: A Historical Survey (PDF), archived from the original (PDF) on September 16, 2012
- Lai, Whalen, Ma-Tsu Tao-I And The Unfolding Of Southern Zen
- Lathouwers, Ton (2000), Meer dan een mens kan doen. Zentoespraken, Rotterdam: Asoka
- Liang-Chieh (1986), The Record of Tung-shan, Trans. by William F. Powell, Kuroda Institute
- * Lievens, Bavo (1981), Ma-tsu. De gesprekken, Bussum: Het Wereldvenster
- Loori, John Daido (2006), Sitting with Koans: Essential Writings on Zen Koan Introspection, Wisdom Publications, ISBN 978-0-86171-369-1
- Low, Albert (2000), Zen and the Sutras, Boston: Turtle Publishing
- Low, Albert (2006), Hakuin on Kensho. The Four Ways of Knowing, Boston & London: Shambhala
- Matthiessen, Peter (1987), Nine-headed dragon river: Zen journals, 1969-1985, Shambhala
- McCauley, Charles (2005), Zen and the Art of Wholeness, iUniverse
- McMahan, David L. (2008), The Making of Buddhist Modernism, Oxford University Press, ISBN 978-0-19-518327-6
- McRae, John (1991), Shen-hui and the Teaching of Sudden Enlightenment in Early Ch'an Buddhism. In: Peter N. Gregory (editor)(1991), Sudden and Gradual. Approaches to Enlightenment in Chinese Thought, Delhi: Motilal Banarsidass Publishers
- McRae, John (2003), Seeing Through Zen. Encounter, Transformation, and Genealogy in Chinese Chan Buddhism, The University Press Group, ISBN 978-0-520-23798-8
- McRae, John (2005), Critical introduction by John McRae to the reprint of Dumoulin's A history of Zen (PDF)
- McRae, John (2008), THE PLATFORM SUTRA OF THE SIXTH PATRIARCH. Translated from the Chinese of Zongbao (Taishō Volume 48, Number 2008) by John R. McRae (PDF), archived from the original (PDF) on August 22, 2012
- Mumon, Yamada (2004), The Ten Oxherding Pictures, translated by Hori), Victor Sōgen, University of Hawai'i press
- Pajin, Dusan (1988), On Faith in Mind - Translation and Analysis of the Hsin Hsin Ming. In: Journal of Oriental Studies, Vol. XXVI, No. 2, Hong Kong 1988, pp. 270-288
- Poceski, Mario, Attitudes Towards Canonicity and Religious Authority in Tang Chan
- Sato, Kemmyō Taira, D.T. Suzuki and the Question of War (PDF)
- Sasaki, Ruth Fuller (2009), The Record of Linji. Translation and commentary by Ruth Fuller Sasaki. Edited by Thomas Yūhō Kirchner (PDF), Honolulu: University of Hawai‘i Press
- Sekida, Katuski (1996), Two Zen Classics. Mumonkan, the gateless gate. Hekiganroku, the blue cliff record, New York & Tokyo: Weatherhill
- Sharf, Robert H. (August 1993), "The Zen of Japanese Nationalism", History of Religions, 33 (1): 1–43, doi:10.1086/463354, S2CID 161535877
- Sharf, Robert H. (1995), Whose Zen? Zen Nationalism Revisited (PDF)
- Sharf, Robert H. (1995c), "Sanbokyodan. Zen and the Way of the New Religions" (PDF), Japanese Journal of Religious Studies, 22 (3–4), doi:10.18874/jjrs.22.3-4.1995.417-458
- Snelling, John (1987), The Buddhist handbook. A Complete Guide to Buddhist Teaching and Practice, London: Century Paperbacks
- Suzuki, Shunryu (1997), Branching streams flow in the darkness: Zen talks on the Sandokai, University of California Press, ISBN 9780520222267
- Swanson, Paul L. (1993), The Spirituality of Emptiness in Early chinese Buddhism. In: Buddhist Spirituality. Indian, Southeast Asian, Tibetan, Early Chinese; edited by Takeuchi Yoshinori, New York: Crossroad
- Tweed, Thomas A. (2005), "American Occultism and Japanese Buddhism. Albert J. Edmunds, D. T. Suzuki, and Translocative History" (PDF), Japanese Journal of Religious Studies, 32 (2): 249–281, archived from the original (PDF) on 2012-05-22
- Victoria, Brian Daizen (2006), Zen at war (Second ed.), Lanham e.a.: Rowman & Littlefield Publishers, Inc.
- Victoria, Brian Daizen (2010), "The "Negative Side" of D. T. Suzuki's Relationship to War" (PDF), The Eastern Buddhist, 41 (2): 97–138
- Wayman, Alex and Hideko (1990), The Lion's roar of Queen Srimala, Delhi: Motilal Banarsidass Publishers
- Welter, Albert, The Textual History of the Linji lu (Record of Linji): The Earliest Recorded Fragments
- Welter, Albert. "Mahakasyapa's smile. Silent Transmission and the Kung-an (Koan) Tradition". In Heine & Wright (2000).
- Yampolski, Philip (1967), The Platform Sutra of the Sixth Patriarch. Translated with notes by Philip B. Yampolsky, Columbia University Press, ISBN 978-0-231-08361-4
- Yampolski, Philip (2003a), Chan. A Historical Sketch. In: Buddhist Spirituality. Later China, Korea, Japan and the Modern World; edited by Takeuchi Yoshinori, Delhi: Motilal Banarsidass
- Yampolski, Philip (2003b), Zen. A Historical Sketch. In: Buddhist Spirituality. Later China, Korea, Japan and the Modern World; edited by Takeuchi Yoshinori, Delhi: Motilal Banarsidass
- Yanagida, Seizan (2009), Historical Introduction to The Record of Linji. In: The record of Linji, translated by Ruth Fuller Sasakia e.a. Pages 59-115 (PDF), University of Hawaii Press
- Yen, Chan Master Sheng (2006), Attaining the way : a guide to the practice of Chan Buddhism, Boston: Shambhala, ISBN 978-1-59030-372-6, OCLC 69013113
- Yoshizawa, Katsuhiro (2009), The Religious Art of Zen Master Hakuin, Counterpoint Press
- Young, Stuart (2009), Linji Lu and Chinese Orthodoxy. Review of "Albert Welter. The Linji lu and the Creation of Chan Orthodoxy: The Development of Chan's Records of Sayings Literature.
